= Canin =

Canin is a surname. Notable people with the surname include:

- Ethan Canin (born 1960), American author, educator, and physician
- Martin Canin (1930–2019), American pianist
- Stuart Canin (born 1926), American violinist and conductor

== See also ==
- Cann (surname)
- Canini (surname)
