= Canini =

Canini may refer to:

- Canini (tribe), the scientific name for a tribe of canines: a group of species which includes dogs, wolves, jackals, and some South American foxes
- Canini (surname)
