= Santi Domenico e Sisto =

Church in Rome

- Church of Saints Dominic and Sixtus
- Chiesa di Santi Domenico e Sisto
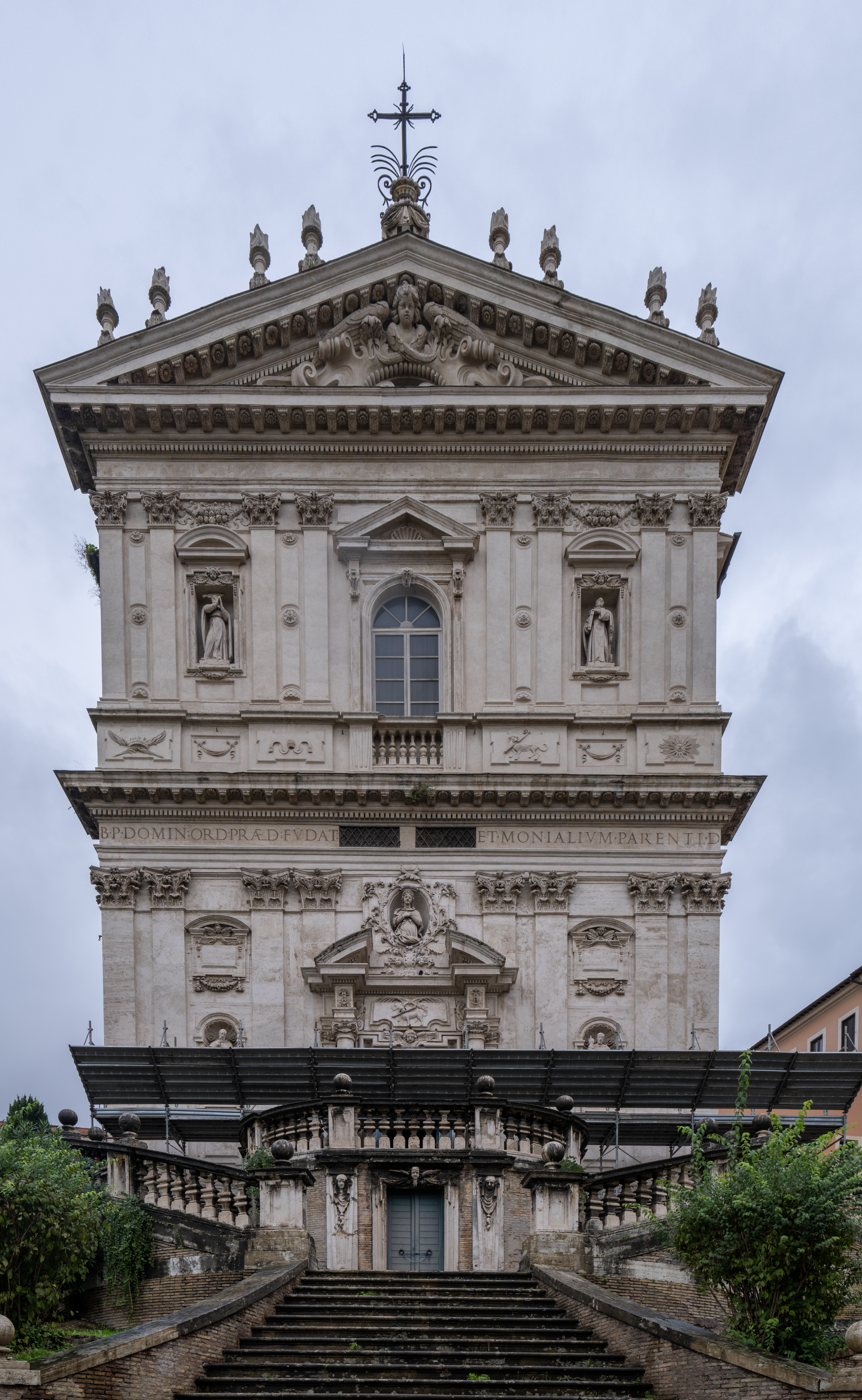
- Santi Domenico e Sisto, with the two lower statues of St. Dominic and St. Sixtus by Carlo Maderno, and two upper statues of St. Thomas Aquinas and St. Peter of Verona by Marcantonio Canini.
- Click on the map for a fullscreen view
- 41°53′45.37″N 12°29′16.91″E
- Location: 1 Largo Angelicum, Rome
- Country: Italy
- Language: Italian
- Denomination: Catholic
- Tradition: Roman Rite
- Religious order: Dominican Order

History
- Dedication: Saint Dominic and Pope Sixtus II

Architecture
- Architect(s): Giacomo della Porta, Orazio Torriani
- Architectural type: Baroque
- Groundbreaking: 1569
- Completed: 1674

Administration
- Diocese: Rome

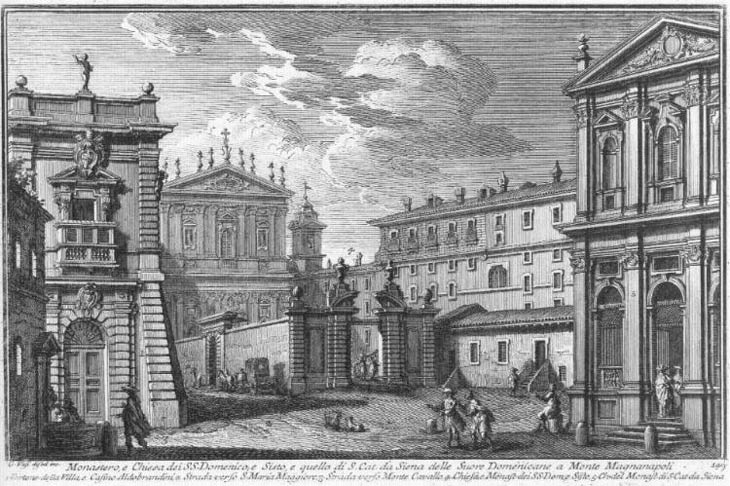
Santi Domenico e Sisto to the left, and the nearby Santa Caterina a Magnanapoli to the right.

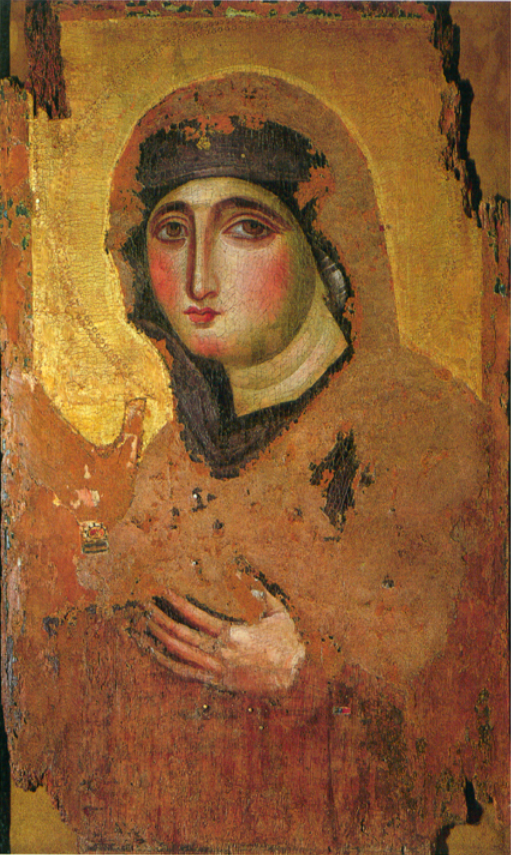
The Maria Advocata, c. 6th century, was displayed in the church from 1575 to 1931

The Church of Santi Domenico e Sisto is one of the titular churches in Rome, Italy in the care of the Roman Catholic Order of Preachers, better known as the Dominicans. It is located at No. 1 Largo Angelicum on the Quirinal Hill on the campus of the Pontifical University of St. Thomas Aquinas (Angelicum), of which it is the University Church.

As a titular church it has been held by :

- Cardinal Georges Cottier (2003 - 2016),
- Cardinal José Tolentino Mendonça (since 5 October 2019).

== History ==
=== Exterior ===
The first church at the site, Santa Maria a Magnanapoli, was built sometime before the year 1000.

The present church was built at the order of Dominican Pope Pius V. Construction on the church began in 1569 and on a convent for Dominican nuns in 1575. The original plan was the work of Giacomo della Porta though during the long construction period that stretched until 1663 several other architects were involved. The lower part of the church was designed by Nicola Torriani, and the upper part by Torriani or Vincenzo della Greca. Della Greca constructed the Baroque travertine façade in 1646, with his brother Felice.

The façade contains four statues. The two upper statues representing Saint Dominic (1170–1221) and Saint Pope Sixtus II (r. 257–258) are by Marcantonio Canini. The two lower statues depict St. Thomas Aquinas and Saint Peter of Verona, were sculpted by Stefano Maderno.

The exterior double staircase built in 1654 is the design of architect Orazio Torriani.

=== Interior ===
In 1649 Gian Lorenzo Bernini made designs for this church including the high altar and the first chapel on the right upon entering. The altar of this chapel and the sculpture group Noli me tangere were executed by Bernini's pupil Antonio Raggi on the designs by Bernini.

The ceiling painting of the Apotheosis of St Dominic was produced in 1674 by Domenico Maria Canuti, with trompe-l'œil framing by Enrico Haffner.

The altarpiece in the third chapel on the south side, by Pier Francesco Mola, depicts St Dominic's Vision. In the second chapel on the north side is Francesco Allegrini's 1532 The Mystical Marriage of St Catherine. In the third chapel on the north side is the 1460 Madonna and Child by Benozzo Gozzoli, a pupil of Fra Angelico.

== University church ==
The church has functioned as the university church for the Pontifical University of St. Thomas Aquinas (Angelicum) since the Dominicans were able to re-acquire the convent complex from the Italian government in 1927 after its expropriation from the Order in 1870 due to the Laws of suppression of religious orders. The church is used to celebrate the solemn inauguration of each academic year, the feast of St. Thomas Aquinas and the official closing of the academic year. It closes during the university's summer break except for the feast of St. Dominic on 7 August. Other than during public functions, visits need to be arranged by prior appointment.

== Depictions in culture ==
The church has been the subject of or appeared in numerous works of art. Antonio Canaletto made a pen and ink study with grey wash and black chalk, today in the collection of the British Museum, described as depicting "the Church of SS Domenico e Sisto, Rome; with a sweeping double staircase to the entrance, in the foreground a man bowing to two approaching ladies."

In 1906, American painter John Singer Sargent completed an oil painting of the exterior staircase and balustrade of the church. Sargent described the ensemble as "a magnificent curved staircase and balustrade, leading to a grand façade that would reduce a millionaire to a worm". Sargent used the architectural features from this painting later in a portrait of Charles William Eliot, President of Harvard University. Sargent also made several preliminary pencil sketches of the balustrade and staircase.

The Church as also been depicted by Ettore Roesler Franz and Eero Saarinen.

The Church and stair feature in the 1950 film Prima comunione by director Alessandro Blasetti.

== See also ==
- Santa Caterina a Magnanapoli
