= Orazio Torriani =

Italian architect and sculptor

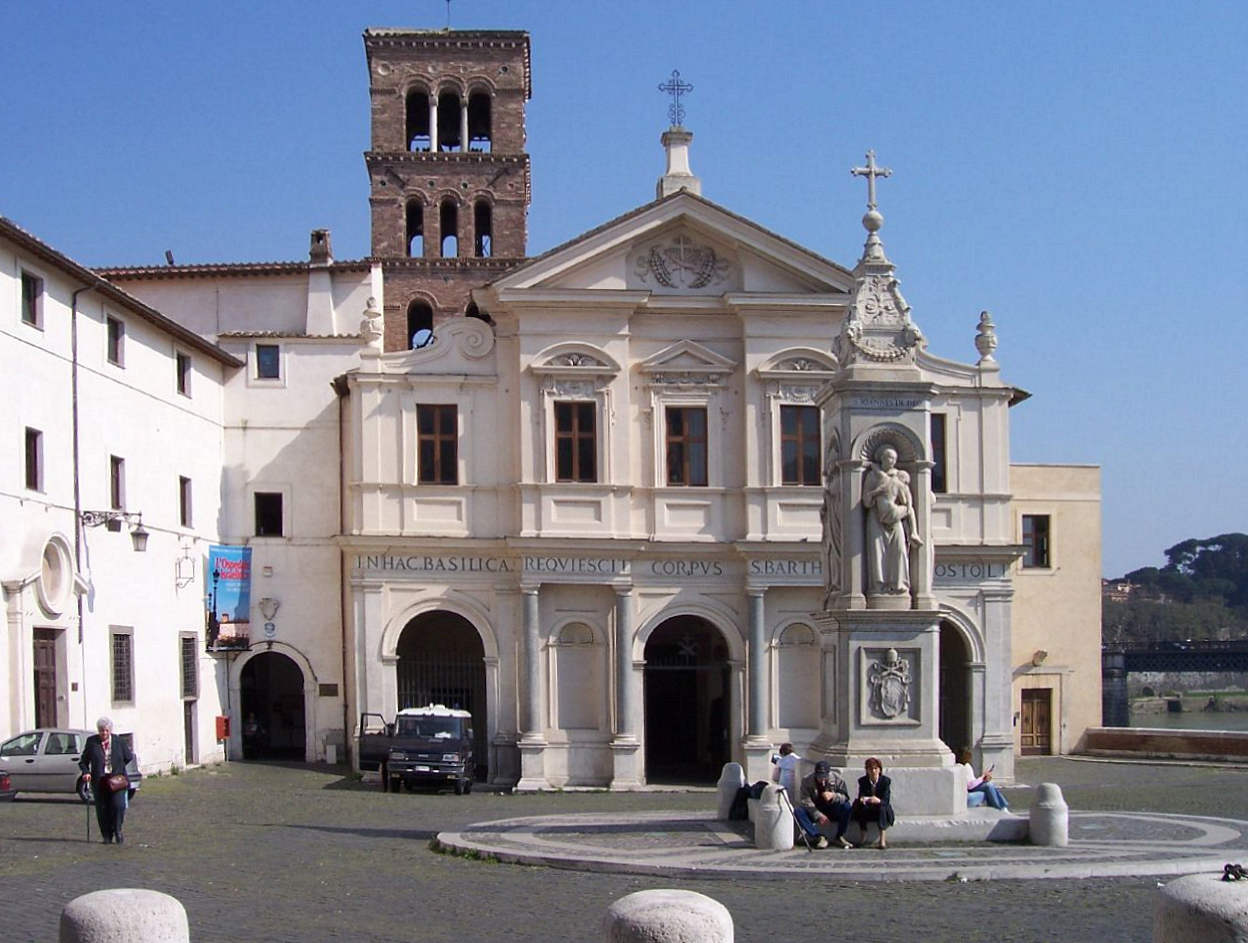
Torriani's façade of San Bartolomeo all'Isola

Orazio Torriani (or Orazio Torrigiani; 1578–1657) was an Italian architect and sculptor who worked in Rome. He was related to architect Nicola Torriani, but their exact relationship is unknown (either brothers, or father/son).

== Career ==
In 1602 Torriani rebuilt the church of San Lorenzo in Miranda within the cella of the Temple of Antoninus and Faustina. In 1624 he built the façade for the ancient basilica of San Bartolomeo all'Isola on the Tiber Island, a work commissioned by Cardinal Trescio.

At the church of Santi Domenico e Sisto, now the church of the Pontifical University of Saint Thomas Aquinas, Angelicum, the double staircase and balustrade built in 1654 are accepted as his work. American painter John Singer Sargent during a visit to Rome in 1906 made an oil painting and several pencil sketches of this staircase and balustrade writing in 1907: "I did in Rome a study of a magnificent curved staircase and balustrade, leading to a grand facade that would reduce a millionaire to a worm...." The painting now hangs at the Ashmolean Museum at Oxford University and the pencil sketches are in the collection of the Harvard University art collection of the Fogg Museum. Sargent later used the architectural features of this stair and balustrade in a portrait of Charles William Eliot, President of Harvard University from 1869-1909.

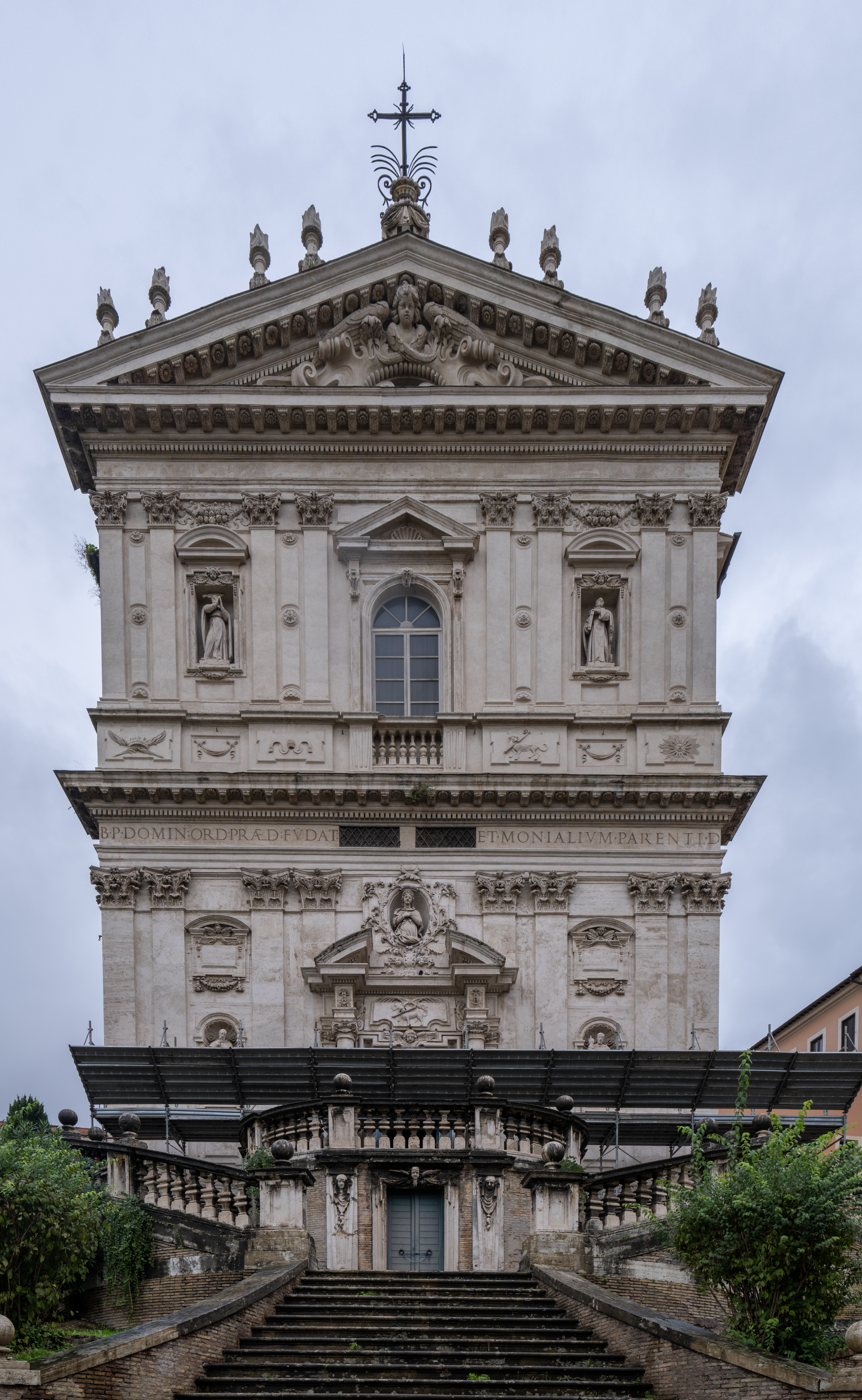
Staircase attributed to Torriani at the Church of SS Domenico and Sisto

At the church of Santi Cosma e Damiano his project commissioned by Urban VIII Barberini and directed by Luigi Arrigucci, he raised the floor to the current level of the Forum of Vespasian.

He built the church of San Francesco di Paola (1624–1630).

In Trastevere, he built the church of San Callisto. An information brochure at the adjacent Palazzo San Callisto states, "In 1618 the Maestri di Strade, or Masters of Roads, issued a license for the construction of the facades of the square (of Santa Maria in Trastevere) and the adjacent street of San Callisto, both to be built by Orazio Torriani."

The aedicular altar in Sant'Agostino (1627), often attributed to Bernini, is his design.

In the construction of the façade for the Jesuit church of Sant'Ignazio Torriani was called in, with Martino Longhi the Younger, to critique the revised design by the Jesuit, Fra Antonio Sasso; they found fault with it and recommended, in vain, that the original design by Father Antonio Grassi be adhered to. Their proposals included no contributions of their own.

More than thirty drawings by Torriani are conserved in the Kunstbibliothek Berlin.

Like all designers of the Renaissance and Baroque, Torriani was called upon to design quite temporary constructions for feasts and occasions, and here his work could express the most recent developments. We only know about his thalamus for the procession at Santa Maria sopra Minerva at the Feast of the Rosary, 5 October 1625, because it was memorialised in an engraving. It was an openwork domed baldachin supported in Solomonic columns such as those Bernini was providing for St. Peter's Basilica. There are further designs for ephemeral occasions in the Kunstbibliothek Berlin.
