= Palazzo San Callisto =

Palace of St. Callixtus
- Palazzo di San Callisto (Italian)
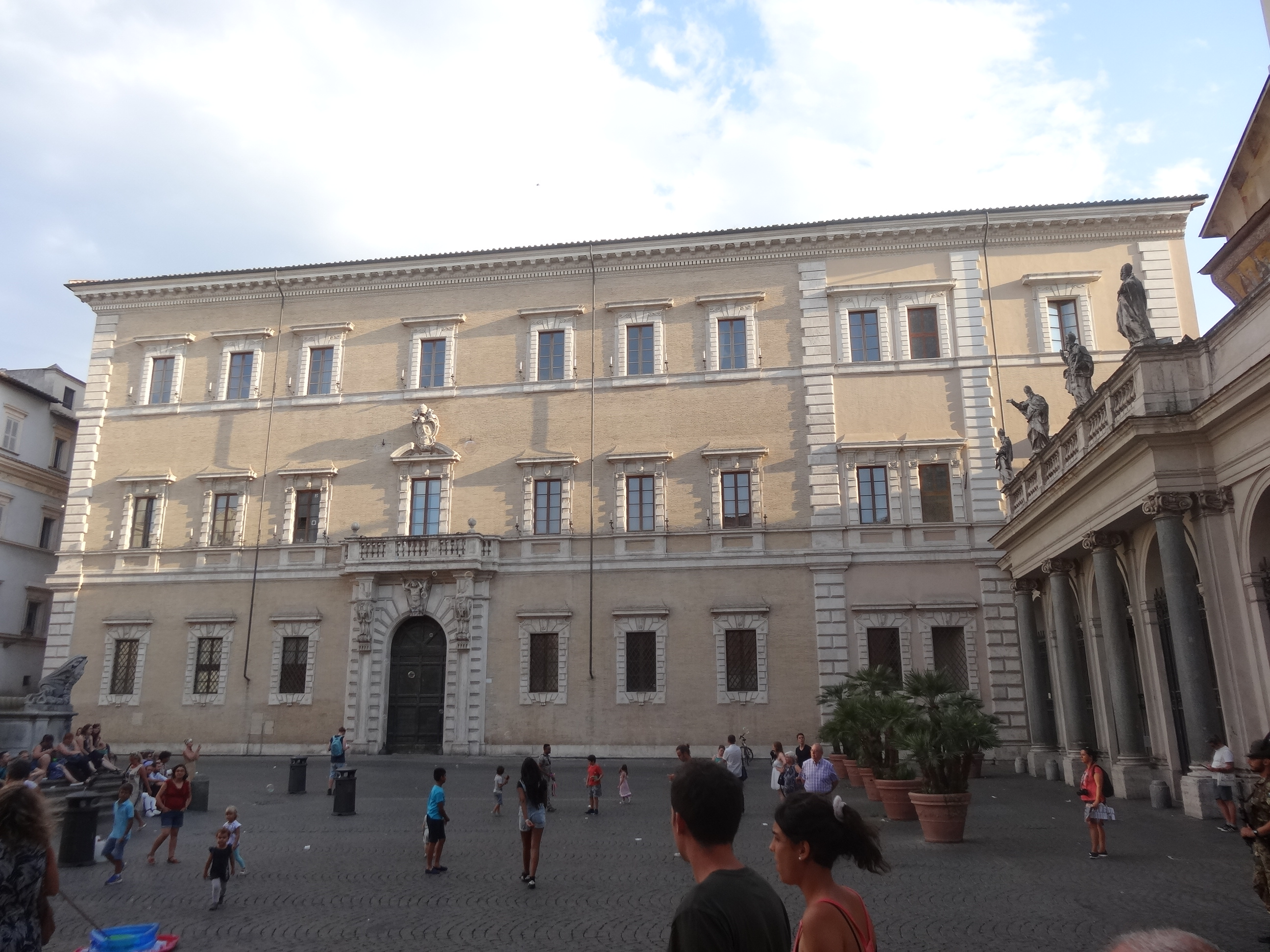
- Palace of St. Callixtus

General information
- Architectural style: Baroque
- Location: Vatican City - Trastevere, Extraterritorial Property of the Holy See in Rome
- Coordinates: 41°53′20″N 12°28′14″E
- Current tenants: Dicasteries; Offices of the Roman Curia and of the diplomatic service of the Holy See; Catholic organizations; Residence of prelates and Roman Curia officials
- Construction started: 1609
- Owner: Holy See

Design and construction
- Architect: Orazio Torriani

The Palazzo San Callisto (also known as the Palace of Saint Callixtus) is a Baroque palace in the Trastevere neighborhood of Rome and one of the extraterritorial Properties of the Holy See. The original Palazzo is located in the Piazza di Santa Maria in Trastevere, the later extensions have their entrance in Piazza di San Callisto. The entire complex is one of the areas of the Holy See regulated by the 1929 Lateran Treaty signed with the Kingdom of Italy. As such it has extraterritorial status.

In the courtyard of the palace is the well where, according to tradition, Pope Callixtus I was martyred in the year 222.

== History ==
The palace was originally the residence of the titular cardinals of the Basilica of Santa Maria in Trastevere and was renovated in the 16th century under Cardinal Giovanni Morone by architect Orazio Torriani. Pope Paul V granted the palace to the monks of the Order of St. Benedict who had to leave their previous monastery due to an extension of the Quirinal Palace. The building took the name of the small adjacent church of San Callisto. Between 1610 and 1618 both the church and the convent were renovated.

In 1936 during the pontificate of Pope Pius XI the architect Giuseppe Momo, known for the double helix staircase of the Vatican Museums, designed the construction of a new wing.

One facade of the palace faces the celebrated Fountain in Piazza Santa Maria in Trastevere.

In 1990, the Palazzo was placed on the UNESCO World Heritage Register.

== Current Use ==
It currently serves as home to:

- The Dicastery for Promoting Integral Human Development
- The Dicastery for the Laity, Family and Life
- Pontifical Commission for Latin America
- Caritas Internationalis
- The International Catholic Charismatic Renewal Services
- Circolo San Pietro
- Scholas Occurentes
- Other Catholic organisations that are part of or directly linked to the Holy See
- Residences of prelates and other Roman Curia officials

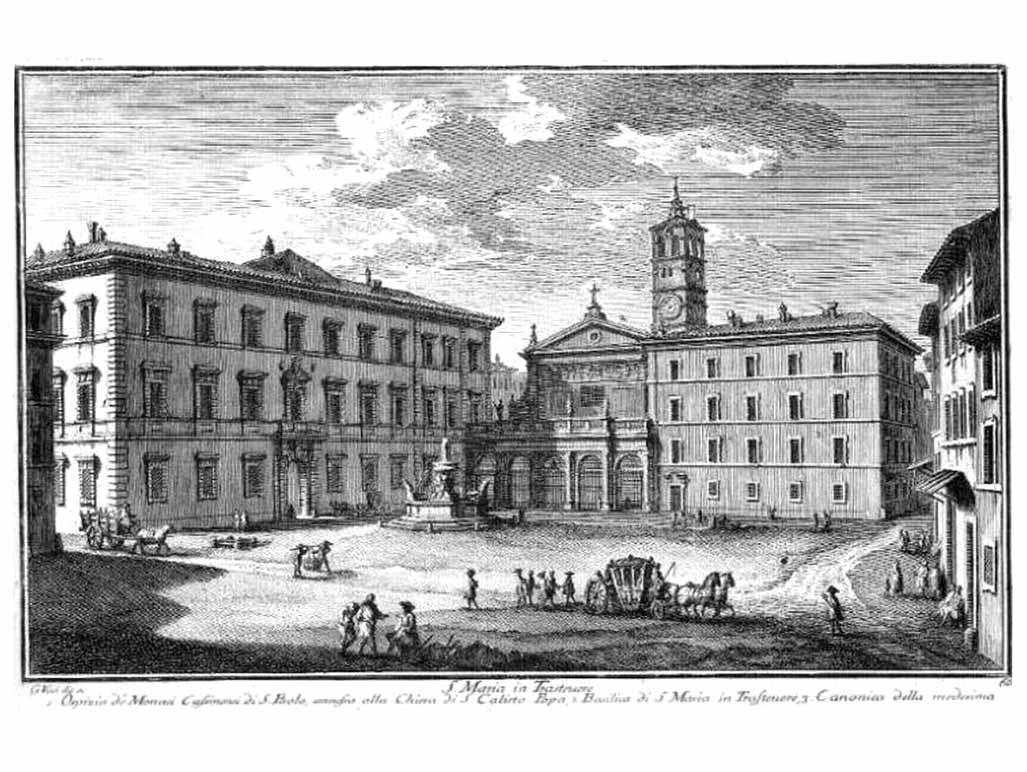
Piazza di Santa Maria in Trastevere, Giuseppe Vasi, 1753

== See also ==
- Properties of the Holy See
- Pope Callixtus I
- Church of St. Callixtus
- Pope Paul V
- Giovanni Morone
- Orazio Torriani
- Pope Pius XI
- Giuseppe Momo
- Santa Maria in Trastevere
- Trastevere
