= Temple of Antoninus and Faustina =

Ancient religious monument in Rome, Italy

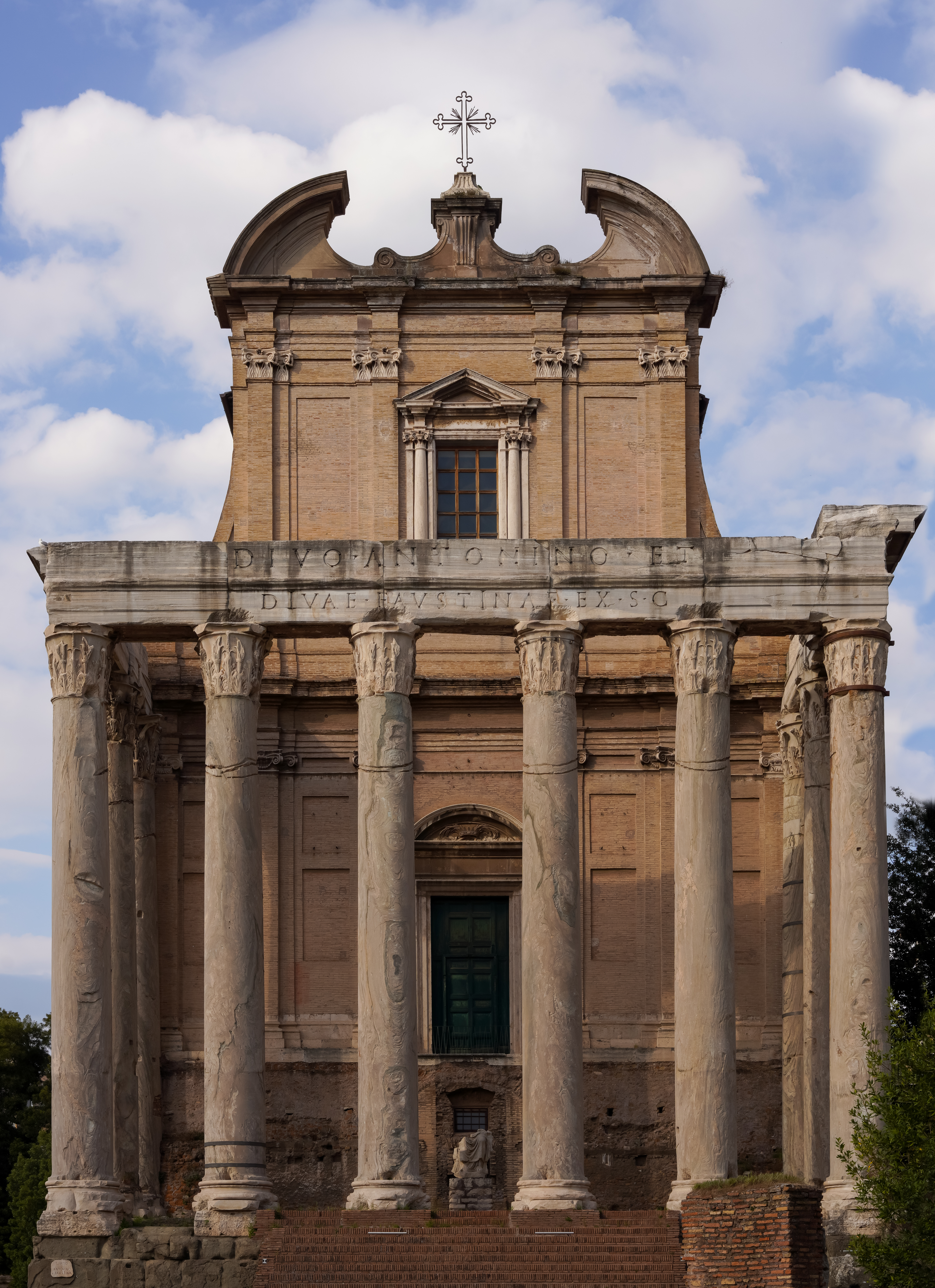
- Exterior of the Temple of Antoninus and Faustina and San Lorenzo in Miranda

- Shown within Augustan Rome
- Interactive map of Temple of Antoninus and Faustina
- 41°53′31.70″N 12°29′12.08″E
- Type: Roman temple
- Location: Regio IV Templum Pacis

History
- Built: 141 AD

The Temple of Antoninus and Faustina was an ancient Roman temple in Rome, which was later converted into a Roman Catholic church, San Lorenzo in Miranda. It is located in the Forum Romanum, on the Via Sacra, opposite the Regia.

== Temple ==
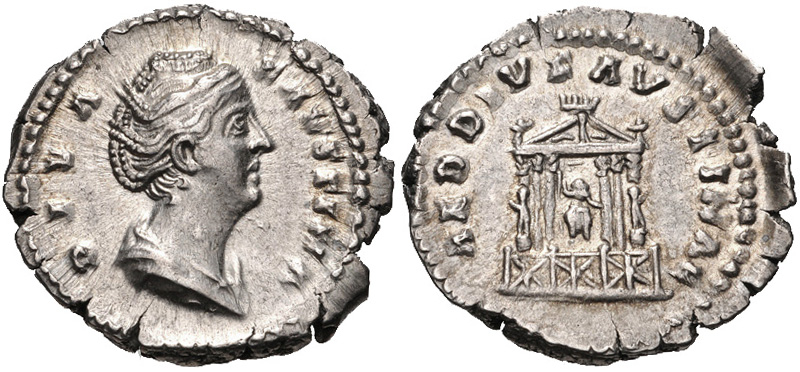
Roman denarius depicting Faustina the Elder and the exterior of the Temple of Antoninus and Faustina.

Antoninus Pius initiated the temple's construction in 141 AD. It was initially dedicated to his deceased and deified wife, Faustina the Elder. Because of this, Faustina was the first Roman empress with a permanent presence in the Forum Romanum. When Antoninus Pius was deified after his death in 161 AD, the temple was re-dedicated to both Antoninus and Faustina by his successor, Marcus Aurelius.

The building stands on a high platform of large grey peperino tufa blocks. The latter of two dedicatory inscriptions says, Divo Antonino et Divae Faustinae Ex S.C. (English: For deified Antoninus and (deified) Faustina, by decree of the Senate). Normally, it is uncommon for Latin sentences to repeat an adjective. In this particular inscription, the adjective 'deified' is written twice, letting scholars believe that the lower inscription was put there first and the top one was added later. The eight monolithic Corinthian columns of its pronaos, made of Karystian marble, are 17 metres (56 ft) in height. The rich bas-reliefs of the frieze under the cornice, featuring griffins, acanthus scrolls, and candelabra, were often copied from the sixteenth through the nineteenth centuries.

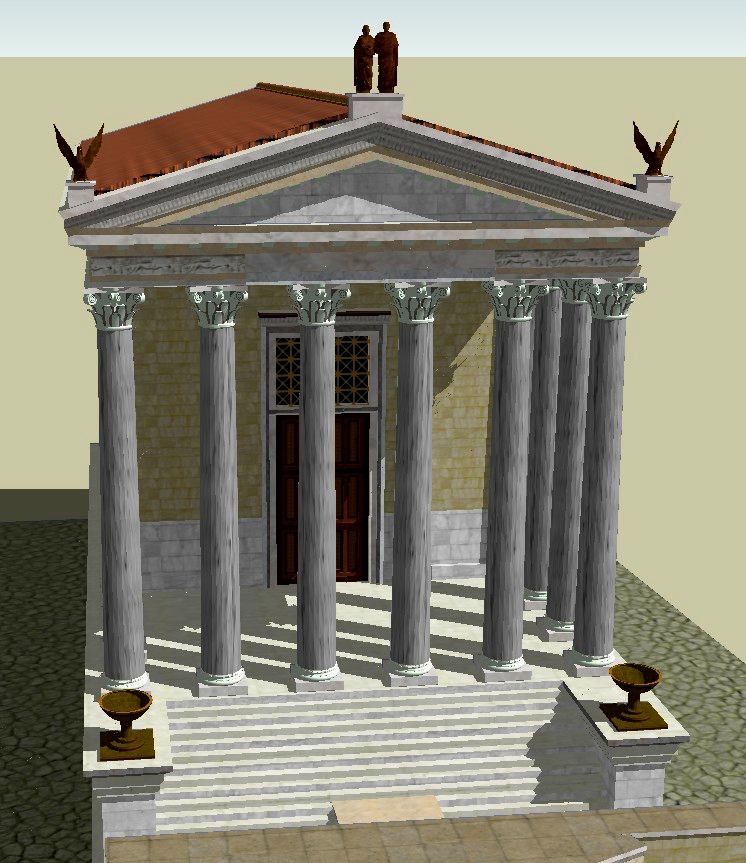
3D reconstruction of the Temple of Antoninus and Faustina

Based on numismatic evidence, the temple was originally fenced off from the Via Sacra and a large, seated statue of Faustina would have been inside of the cella. Fragments of this statue and one of Antoninus Pius, which was added later, were discovered in front of the Temple.

== Church ==
The temple was converted into a Roman Catholic church, the Chiesa di San Lorenzo in Miranda, perhaps as early as the seventh century, but it is only attested from the eleventh century work Mirabilia Urbis Romae. "Miranda" may derive from the name of a benefactress. (Note: A fanciful derivation from the Latin mirare ("to admire"), imagined as referring to the excellent panorama of the Forum from the church's steps, diachronically attributes to the medieval public an eighteenth-century appreciation for the picturesque.) At that time, it was thought that this was the location of the sentencing of St. Lawrence, Deacon and Martyr to death by the Prefect of Rome, hence its dedication.

Christianization accounts for the survival of the cella and portico of the temple through the centuries, though it did not preserve the edifice from all damage. Originally, the podium was faced with white marble slabs, with matching marble mouldings at the top and bottom. Most of the marble facing was scavenged, except for the moulding. The deep grooves in the temple's columns are supposed to date to a medieval attempt to dismantle the pillared portico, either for spolia or to destroy the pagan temple. The grooves also may have been used to attach a makeshift roof over the portico. Also in the Middle Ages, a staircase was built on the side facing the Forum, but it is now impossible to enter from that side because there is a gap of circa 6 metres (20 ft) between the foot of the steps and the bronze door. Before the archeological excavations, the ground level was at this door. Excavations in front of the temple were undertaken in 1546, again in 1810, and at intervals from 1876. In 1429 or 1430, Pope Martin V gave the church to the Collegio degli Speziali (Guild of Apothecaries), at the time officially denominated the "Universitas Aromatorium". The College still uses its adjoining guildhall, which contains a small museum that holds a receipt for medicine that Raphael signed. Side chapels were erected after this date. The church lacks the usual eastern apse: one was never added so as to retain the temple's structural integrity.

In 1536, the church was partially demolished and the side chapels removed in order to restore the ancient temple for the visit to Rome of Holy Roman Emperor Charles V. The church, now constrained within the cella of the temple, was remodelled in 1602 by Orazio Torriani, creating a single nave and three new side chapels. The main altar has a reredos canvas by Pietro da Cortona of the Martyrdom of St. Lawrence (1646), while the first chapel on the left hosts the Madonna and Child with Saints (1626) by Domenichino.

== See also ==
- List of Ancient Roman temples

Preceded by Ara Pacis	Landmarks of Rome; Temple of Antoninus and Faustina	Succeeded by Temple of Apollo Palatinus
