= Canini (surname) =

Canini is an Italian surname. Notable people with the surname include:

- Angelo Canini (1521–1527), Italian grammarian
- Giovanni Angelo Canini (1617–1666), Italian painter and engraver
- Manuel Canini (born 1993), Italian footballer
- Marcantonio Canini (1622–1669), Italian painter and sculptor
- Michele Canini (born 1985), Italian footballer
- Renato Canini (1936–2013), Brazilian illustrator
