= Marcantonio Canini =

Italian painter and sculptor (1622–1669)

Marcantonio Canini (1622–1669) was an Italian painter and sculptor. He was born in Rome and is best known for his statues of St. Dominic and St. Sixtus, and for the facade of Santi Domenico e Sisto, the University Church of the Pontifical University of St. Thomas Aquinas, Angelicum, in Rome.

He was the third-born son of the stonemason Vincenzo. He lived in Rome with his famous brother, painter Giovanni Angelo.
