= Ludovicus Carretus =

Sixteenth century physician

Ludovicus Carretus was a physician and a Jewish convert to Catholic Christianity of the sixteenth century.

== Life ==
He lived at Florence. He was a native of France and was originally called "Todros Cohen." As the physician of a Spanish duke, he was with the imperial troops who besieged Florence in 1545. Later, at the age of fifty, he embraced Catholic Christianity at Genoa.

== Works ==
Carretus is the author of Mar'ot Elohim; Liber Visorum Divinorum, in which he relates the history of his conversion and quotes passages from the Bible and kabbalistic writings in favor of Christianity. The work, published at Paris in 1553, was translated into Latin by Angelo Canini (Florence, 1554) under the title Epistola Ludovici Carreti ad Judæos, Quæ Inscribitur Liber Visorum Divinorum. Another Latin translation of it was made by Hermann Germberg, and is inserted in Johannes Buxtorf's Synagoga Judaica.
