= Magnanapoli =

Magnanapoli is a name given to part of the Quirinal Hill in Rome, literally meaning Great Naples. The two most common explanations are that this is a corruption of:

- Balnea Pauli (Baths of Paul), name given to the nearby Trajan's Market when it was thought to be a thermal-baths complex built by Pope Paul I
- Magnus Neapolitani Regni Connestabilis (Latin for Great Constable of the Kingdom of Naples), a post held by members of the Colonna family, deriving from their many fiefs in the Kingdom of Naples. They held many towers in this area (like, but not including, the Torre delle Milizie, which was built to oppose the Colonna's towers), and the corruption could have crept in from a shortened or damaged inscription.

Today, piazza Magnanapoli is the site of the following churches:

- Santa Caterina a Magnanapoli
- Saints Dominic and Sixtus, the university church of the Pontifical University of Saint Thomas Aquinas, Angelicum.
