= Angelo Canini =

Italian grammarian, linguist and scholar

Angelo Canini (Angelus Caninius; 1521–1557) was an Italian grammarian, linguist and scholar from Anghiari.

== Life ==
His first publication was Book II of the commentary of Alexander of Aphrodisias on the De anima of Aristotle (Venice 1546). In the same year he translated the commentary on the De mixtione, and the commentary of Simplicius on the Enchiridion of Epictetus (a revision of Politian's). He published an edition of Aristophanes at Venice in 1548 (Aristophanes Comoediae Undecim, Giovanni Griffio).

After time in Spain, he found a patron in Guillaume du Prat, who helped him move to Paris.

He wrote an Aramaic grammar, published in 1554, and taught Hebrew in Paris in the 1550s. At Paris he taught Greek to Bonaventura Corneille Bertram and Dudithius; he was at the Collège des Lombards and then the Collège de Cambrai. In 1555 he published in Paris a Greek grammar, Hellenismus (Ellenismos).

He also translated into Latin as Liber Visorum Divinorum a Hebrew work of Ludovicus Carretus.

He died in the Auvergne, France.
