= Nicola Torriani =

Italian architect 17th-century

Nicola Torriani was an Italian architect during the 17th century. He was related to architect and sculptor Orazio Torriani, but the exact relationship is unknown. His works include the lower part (and possibly also the upper part) of Santi Domenico e Sisto.
