= Averroes's theory of the unity of the intellect =

Medieval theory about human intellect

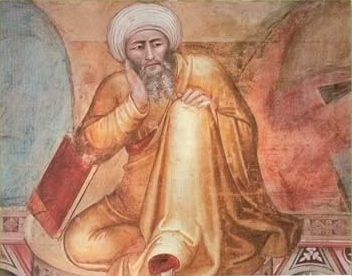
The unity of the intellect thesis was proposed by Averroes, painted here by the 14th century artist Andrea Bonaiuto.

The unity of the intellect (also called the unicity of the intellect or monopsychism), a philosophical theory proposed by the medieval Andalusian philosopher Averroes (1126–1198), asserted that all humans share the same intellect. Averroes expounded his theory in his long commentary on Aristotle's On the Soul to explain how universal knowledge is possible within the Aristotelian philosophy of mind. Averroes's theory was influenced by related ideas propounded by previous thinkers such as Aristotle himself, Plotinus, Al-Farabi, Avicenna (Ibn Sina) and Avempace (Ibn Bajja).

Once Latin translations of Averroes's works became available in the 13th century, this theory was taken up and expanded by Averroists in the Christian West, such as Siger of Brabant (c. 1240 – c. 1284), John of Jandun (c. 1285 – 1328) and John Baconthorpe (c. 1290 – 1347). It also influenced the secularist political philosophy of Dante Alighieri (c. 1265 – 1321) in the fourteenth century. However, it was rejected by other philosophers—including Thomas Aquinas (1225 – 1274), who wrote a detailed critique—and Averroes received condemnation from Catholic Church authorities.

== Background ==
The idea of a single, universal intellect associated with all human knowledge had been proposed by philosophers before Averroes. The Greek philosopher Aristotle (384–322 BC) proposes a "maker intellect" which enables thinking by making things intelligible, much like light allows seeing by making things visible. Plotinus (d. 270), whose works were well known in the Islamic world, proposed that human beings gained knowledge through their relation to a divine intellect. Muslim philosophers Al-Farabi (d. 951) and Avicenna (also known as Ibn Sina, d. 1037) further develop this theory and call it the "agent intellect", which gives forms to matter and facilitates human knowledge. Avempace (also known as Ibn Bajja, d. 1138) proposed a theory of the intellect that was to influence Averroes's theory, but scholars disagree on the extent of his thinking and how his writing should be interpreted.

Averroes's idea is different from the previous theories because the other ones hold that the universal intellect is superhuman and that each human individual has its own intellect, while Averroes identifies the single intellect with the mind of all humans. While Averroes propounds his general ideas on human intellect in all of his three commentaries on Aristotle's On the Soul, this theory only appears in his final long commentary. He provides different theses for explaining human knowledge in his previous two commentaries, suggesting that the notion of unity of the intellect is his most mature theory after having considered other ideas.

== Theory ==
=== Averroes's original thesis ===
Averroes argues, as put by the historian of philosophy Peter Adamson, that "there is only one, single human capacity for human knowledge". He calls it—using contemporary terminology—the "material intellect", which is one and the same for all human beings. The intellect is eternal and continuously thinking about all that can be thought. It uses faculties (e.g. the brain) of individual humans as a basis for its thinking process. The process that happens in the human brain is called fikr by Averroes (known as cogitatio in Latin, often translated to "cogitation" in English), a process which contains not universal knowledge but "active consideration of particular things" that the person has encountered. This use of human faculty explains why thinking can be an individual experience: if at one point the universal intellect is using one's brain to think about an object of thought, then that person is also experiencing the thinking.

For Averroes, this explains how universal knowledge is possible: it is because there is a universal capacity for knowledge. He also uses it to interpret passages in Aristotle's On the Soul, and this exegetical value is seen as the theory's strong point by Averroes and the theory's later proponents.

=== Latin Averroists ===
Starting from the thirteenth century, Western European writers translated Averroes's works into Latin, generating a circle of followers known as the Latin Averroists. The Latin Averroists took up, among other Averroes's ideas, the theory of the unity of the intellect, and elaborated it. Siger of Brabant argues that this unique intellect is associated with the human body in an "operational union" only. John of Jandun says that the intellect operates within the body and is united to it thanks to the phantasmata. Another Averroist, John Baconthorpe proposed that there is an ontological and an epistemological aspect of the union between the unique intellect and the body, developing a theory that is called the "double conjunction" (Latin: copulatio bifaria). He argues that thanks to the ontological conjunction, the intellect becomes a human faculty.

== Reaction ==
=== Reception ===
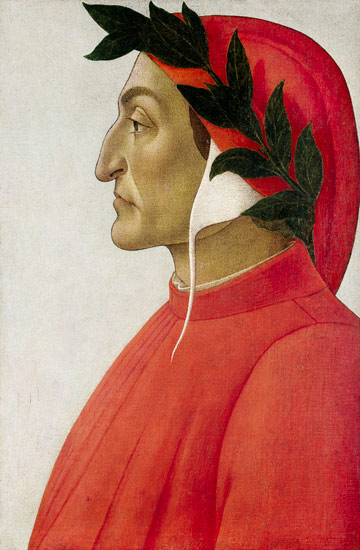
The unity of the intellect was one of the inspirations for Dante Alighieri's (pictured) political philosophy treatise De Monarchia.

While Averroes's works have very limited influence in the Islamic world, the Latin translation of his works enjoyed a wide audience in Western Europe. The unity of the intellect thesis, in particular, generated an intellectual controversy in Latin Christendom. Many, especially the Averroists, saw appeal in the theory because it explained universal knowledge and justified Aristotle's idea of the intellective soul. The Latin Averroists who supported this theory often elaborated it further and tried to resolve questions that Averroes did not tackle in his original work (see above). The Italian poet Dante Alighieri (c. 1265 – 1321) used Averroes's theory as a basis for his secularist political philosophy in the treatise De Monarchia. He argued that given that all mankind shares one intellect, men should be politically united to achieve their highest goals, universal peace and happiness on earth.

=== Criticisms ===
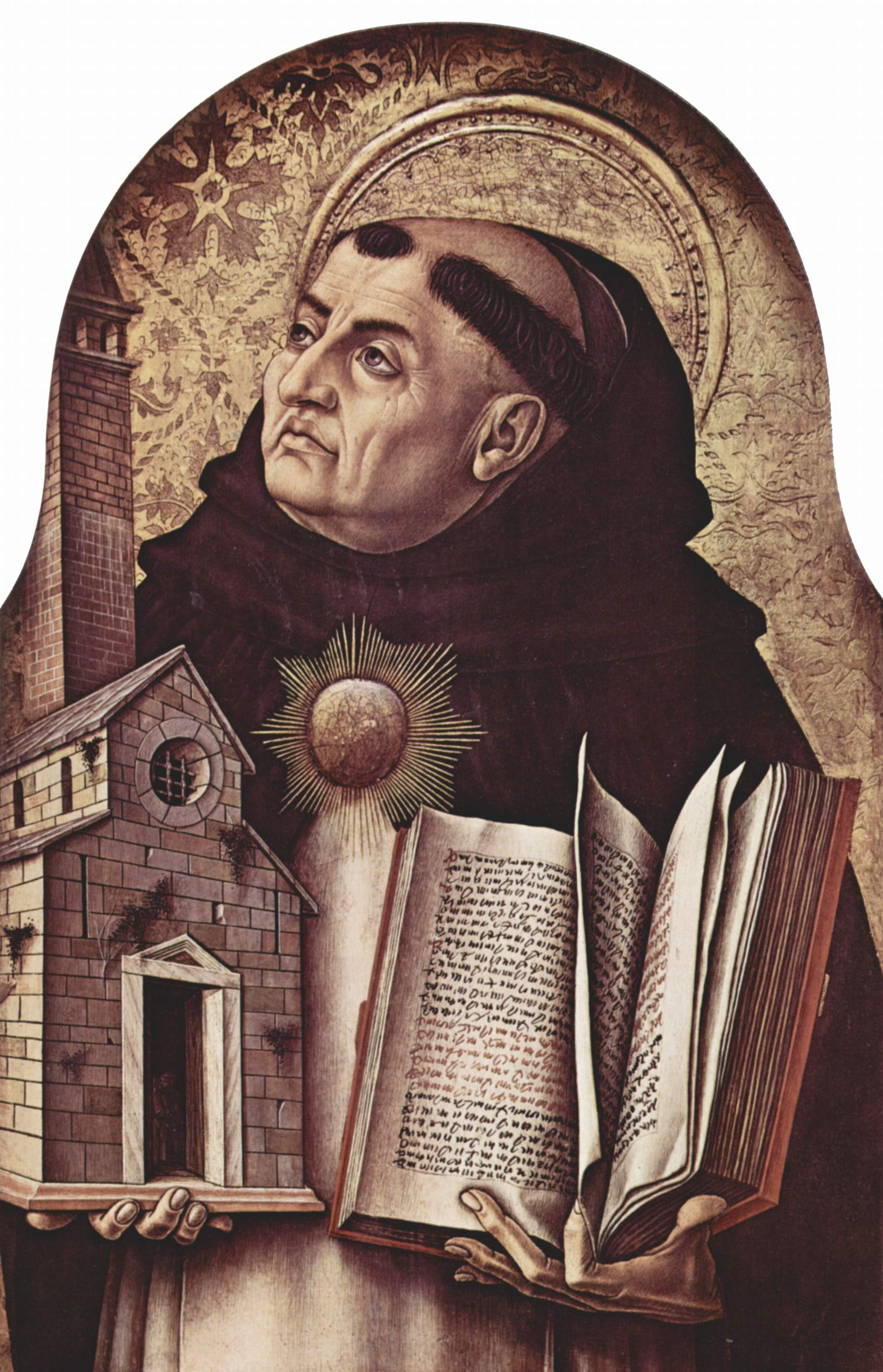
Thomas Aquinas, who wrote a detailed treatise attacking the unity of the intellect thesis.

Other thinkers, however, were opposed to the theory. Many scholastic thinkers, including the Italian Thomas Aquinas criticized it for not being able to explain how humans can think individually, and how this single intellect is associated with human body. They also criticized the thesis from the theological standpoint. If there is only one eternal soul, and individualized thinking only happens through a lower faculty which will perish with the body when a person dies, then the theory fails to provide for a person's immortality and afterlife.

Thomas Aquinas wrote a treatise De Unitate Intellectus, Contra Averroistas ("On the Unity of the Intellect, against the Averroists"), which contained detailed arguments to reject this theory. He used the philosophical and theological oppositions mentioned above, and used his own reading of Aristotle to show that Averroes misinterpreted what Aristotle said. Catholic Church authorities condemned the theory, along with other ideas of Averroes, in 1270 and 1277 (by Bishop Étienne Tempier of Paris) and again in 1489 in Padua by local bishops.

== Modern evaluation ==
Present-day historian of philosophy Peter Adamson says that the theory seems "obviously false" from the modern point of view. However, he also points out that in Averroes's time, it was a reasonable interpretation of Aristotle's ideas, though not necessarily accepted by other contemporary philosophers. According to Adamson, modern criticisms can be levied at the theory, for example by questioning the idea of "universal knowledge" that this theory attempts to explain. Just because a fact (such as "frogs are amphibians") is universal does not mean that the act of thinking about it has to be universal. If the act of thinking about it is not universal, there is no need to explain the phenomenon using a single, universal intellect. The materialistic parallel, can be found in the futurological global brain theory.

== See also ==
- Collective unconscious
- Anamnesis (philosophy)
- Panpsychism
- Anima mundi
