= Eternity of the world =

Philosophical question

The eternity of the world is the question, in philosophy, of whether the world has a beginning in time or has existed for eternity. It was a concern for ancient philosophers as well as theologians and philosophers of the 13th century, and is of interest to modern thinkers as well. The problem became a focus of a dispute in the 13th century, when some of the works of Aristotle, who believed in the eternity of the world, were rediscovered in the Latin West. This view conflicted with the view of the Catholic Church that the world had a beginning in time. The Aristotelian view was prohibited in the Condemnations of 1210–1277.

== Aristotle ==
The ancient Greek philosopher Aristotle argued that the world must have existed from eternity in his Physics as follows. In Book I, he argues that everything that comes into existence does so from a substratum. Therefore, if the underlying matter of the universe came into existence, it would come into existence from a substratum. But the nature of matter is precisely to be the substratum from which other things arise. Consequently, the underlying matter of the universe could have come into existence only from an already existing matter exactly like itself; to assume that the underlying matter of the universe came into existence would require assuming that an underlying matter already existed. As this assumption is self-contradictory, Aristotle argued, matter must be eternal.

In Book VIII, his argument from motion is that if an absolute beginning of motion should be assumed, the object to undergo the first motion must either:

1. have come into existence and begun to move, or
2. have existed in an eternal state of rest before beginning to move.

Option A is self-contradictory because an object cannot move before it comes into existence, and the act of coming into existence is itself a "movement," so that the first movement requires a movement before it, that is, the act of coming into existence. Option B is also unsatisfactory for two reasons:

- First, if the world began at a state of rest, the coming into existence of that state of rest would itself have been motion.
- Second, if the world changed from a state of rest to a state of motion, the cause of that change to motion would itself have been a motion.

He concludes that motion is necessarily eternal.

Aristotle argued that a "vacuum" (that is, a place where there is no matter) is impossible. Material objects can come into existence only in place, that is, occupy space. Were something to come from nothing, "the place to be occupied by what comes into existence would previously have been occupied by a vacuum, inasmuch as no body existed." But a vacuum is impossible, and matter must be eternal.

The Greek philosopher Critolaus (c. 200-c. 118 BC) of Phaselis defended Aristotle's doctrine of the eternity of the world, and of the human race in general, against the Stoics. There is no observed change in the natural order of things; mankind recreates itself in the same manner according to the capacity given by Nature, and the various ills to which it is heir, though fatal to individuals, do not avail to modify the whole. Just as it is absurd to suppose that humans are merely earth-born, so the possibility of their ultimate destruction is inconceivable. The world, as the manifestation of eternal order, must itself be eternal.

== The Neo-Platonists ==
The Neoplatonist philosopher Proclus (412 – 485 AD) advanced in his De Aeternitate Mundi (On the Eternity of the World) eighteen proofs for the eternity of the world, resting on the divinity of its creator.

John Philoponus in 529 wrote his critique Against Proclus On the Eternity of the World in which he systematically argued against every proposition put forward for the eternity of the world. The intellectual battle against eternalism became one of Philoponus’ major preoccupations and dominated several of his publications (some now lost) over the following decade.

Philoponus originated the argument now known as the Traversal of the infinite. If the existence of something requires that something else exist before it, then the first thing cannot come into existence without the thing before it existing. An infinite number cannot actually exist, nor be counted through or 'traversed,' or be increased. Something cannot come into existence if this requires an infinite number of other things existing before it. Therefore, the world cannot be infinite.

The Aristotelian commentator Simplicius of Cilicia and contemporary of Philoponus held that Philoponus’ arguments relied on a fundamental misunderstanding of Aristotelian physics: “To my mind I have demonstrated that when this man objected against these demonstrations he did not comprehend a thing of what Aristotle said.” Simplicius adhered to the Aristotelian doctrine of the eternity of the world and strongly opposed Philoponus, who asserted the beginning of the world through divine creation.

=== Philoponus' arguments ===
Philoponus' arguments for temporal finitism were severalfold. Contra Aristotlem has been lost, and is chiefly known through the citations used by Simplicius of Cilicia in his commentaries on Aristotle's Physics and De Caelo. Philoponus' refutation of Aristotle extended to six books, the first five addressing De Caelo and the sixth addressing Physics, and from comments on Philoponus made by Simplicius can be deduced to have been quite lengthy.

A full exposition of Philoponus' several arguments, as reported by Simplicius, can be found in Sorabji. One such argument was based upon Aristotle's own theorem that there were not multiple infinities, and ran as follows: If time were infinite, then as the universe continued in existence for another hour, the infinity of its age since creation at the end of that hour must be one hour greater than the infinity of its age since creation at the start of that hour. But since Aristotle holds that such treatments of infinity are impossible and ridiculous, the world cannot have existed for infinite time.

Philoponus's works were adopted by many; his first argument against an infinite past being the "argument from the impossibility of the existence of an actual infinite", which states:

"An actual infinite cannot exist."
"An infinite temporal regress of events is an actual infinite."
"Thus an infinite temporal regress of events cannot exist."

This argument defines event as equal increments of time. Philoponus argues that the second premise is not controversial since the number of events prior to today would be an actual infinite without beginning if the universe is eternal. The first premise is defended by a reductio ad absurdum where Philoponus shows that actual infinites can not exist in the actual world because they would lead to contradictions albeit being a possible mathematical enterprise. Since an actual infinite in reality would create logical contradictions, it can not exist including the actual infinite set of past events. The second argument, the "argument from the impossibility of completing an actual infinite by successive addition", states:

"An actual infinite cannot be completed by successive addition."
"The temporal series of past events has been completed by successive addition."
"Thus the temporal series of past events cannot be an actual infinite."

The first statement states, correctly, that a finite (number) cannot be made into an infinite one by the finite addition of more finite numbers. The second skirts around this; the analogous idea in mathematics, that the (infinite) sequence of negative integers "..-3, -2, -1" may be extended by appending zero, then one, and so forth; is perfectly valid.

== Medieval period ==
Avicenna argued that prior to a thing's coming into actual existence, its existence must have been 'possible.' Were its existence necessary, the thing would already have existed, and were its existence impossible, the thing would never exist. The possibility of the thing must therefore in some sense have its own existence. Possibility cannot exist in itself, but must reside within a subject. If an already existent matter must precede everything coming into existence, clearly nothing, including matter, can come into existence ex nihilo, that is, from absolute nothingness. An absolute beginning of the existence of matter is therefore impossible.

The Aristotelian commentator Averroes supported Aristotle's view, particularly in his work The Incoherence of the Incoherence (Tahafut al-tahafut), in which he defended Aristotelian philosophy against al-Ghazali's claims in The Incoherence of the Philosophers (Tahafut al-falasifa).

Averroes' contemporary Maimonides challenged Aristotle's assertion that "everything in existence comes from a substratum," on that basis that his reliance on induction and analogy is a fundamentally flawed means of explaining unobserved phenomenon. According to Maimonides, to argue that "because I have never observed something coming into existence without coming from a substratum it cannot occur" is equivalent to arguing that "because I cannot empirically observe eternity it does not exist."

Maimonides himself held that neither creation nor Aristotle's infinite time were provable, or at least that no proof was available. (According to scholars of his work, he didn't make a formal distinction between unprovability and the simple absence of proof.) However, some of Maimonides' Jewish successors, including Gersonides and Crescas, conversely held that the question was decidable, philosophically.

In the West, the 'Latin Averroists' were a group of philosophers writing in Paris in the middle of the thirteenth century, who included Siger of Brabant, Boethius of Dacia. They supported Aristotle's doctrine of the eternity of the world against conservative theologians such as John Pecham and Bonaventure. The conservative position is that the world can be logically proved to have begun in time, of which the classic exposition is Bonaventure's argument in the second book of his commentary on Peter Lombard's sentences, where he repeats Philoponus' case against a traversal of the infinite.

Thomas Aquinas, like Maimonides, argued against both the conservative theologians and the Averroists, claiming that neither the eternity nor the finite nature of the world could be proved by logical argument alone. According to Aquinas the possible eternity of the world and its creation would be contradictory if an efficient cause were to precede its effect in duration or if non-existence precedes existence in duration. But an efficient cause, such as God, which instantaneously produces its effect would not necessarily precede its effect in duration. God can also be distinguished from a natural cause which produces its effect by motion, for a cause that produces motion must precede its effect. God could be an instantaneous and motionless creator, and could have created the world without preceding it in time. To Aquinas, that the world began was an article of faith.

The position of the Averroists was condemned by Stephen Tempier in 1277.

Giordano Bruno, famously, believed in eternity of the world (and this was one of the heretical beliefs for which he was burned at the stake).

== Modernity ==
The question of the eternity of the world remains unsettled; Alexander Vilenkin is a famous proponent of the view that the world had a beginning, while it is also known that its eternity is a physically consistent possibility.

== See also ==
- Age of the universe
- Averroism
- Al-Biruni
- Condemnations of 1210–1277
- Eternalism (philosophy of time)
- Big Bang
- Kalam Cosmological Argument
- Law of conservation of energy
- Abraham Solomon ben Isaac ben Samuel Catalan, author of a treatise on eternity of the world

== Bibliography ==
- Richard C. Dales (1990). Medieval Discussions of the Eternity of the World. Leiden: Brill. ISBN 90-04-09215-3.
