= John Baconthorpe =

English monk and philosopher (c.1290–1346)

John Baconthorpe, OCarm (also Bacon, Baco, and Bacconius) (c. 1290 – 1346) was a learned English Carmelite friar and scholastic philosopher.

== Life ==
John Baconthorpe was born at Baconsthorpe, Norfolk. He may have been the grandnephew of Roger Bacon (Brit. Mus. Add. MS. 19. 116). In youth, he joined the Carmelite Order, becoming a friar at Blakeney, near Walsingham. He studied at Oxford and Paris. He became regent master of the theology faculty at Paris by 1323. He is believed to have taught theology at Cambridge and Oxford. Eventually, he became known as Doctor Resolutus, though the implication of this is unclear.

He was a provincial prior of England from 1327 to 1333. He appears to have anticipated Wycliffe in advocating the subordination of the clergy to the king. In 1333 he was sent for to Rome, where, we are told, he first maintained the pope's authority in cases of annulment; but this opinion he retracted. He died in London, around 1347. Long after his death, during the Renaissance, he became known as the authority on Carmelite theology.

== Works ==
There are various surviving written works by Baconthorpe. His best-known work, a commentary on the Sentences by Peter Lombard, survives in multiple versions. Nearly three centuries later, it was still studied at Padua, the last home of Averroism, and Lucilio Vanini spoke of him with great veneration. (The text can be found in original Latin under the title Doctoris resoluti Joannis Bacconis Anglici Carmelitae radiantissimi opus super quattuor sententiarum libris.) Additionally, there are three Quodlibeta, questions on canon law, and commentaries on the Gospel of Matthew, Augustine, and Anselm that have survived.

== Philosophy ==
Although well versed in various theological perspectives, Baconthorpe was first and foremost a Carmelite. As a theologian, he made a point to defend the doctrine of Immaculate Conception, and to assert the importance of his order in the context of historical and spiritual tradition. Similarly, Baconthorpe openly debated with his contemporaries, such as Henry of Ghent, Duns Scotus, and Peter Auriol, and consistently challenged the perspectives of earlier philosophers. He even took issue with fellow Carmelites such as Gerard of Bologna, Guido Terreni, and Robert Walsingham.

Baconthorpe is commonly viewed as an Averroist (a follower of Ibn Rushd, or Averroes in the Latin world), though it is unlikely he viewed himself as such. He was given the title princeps Averroistarum, meaning "prince of Averroists," by masters at the University of Padua centuries after his death. Further, he was given this title not because he agreed with Averroes, but merely because of his skill in explaining some of Averroes' philosophical ideas. Most notably, in his Sentences commentary, he discusses the perspective of Averroes in great depth, along with that of Aristotle. Similarly, Renan says that he merely tried to justify Averroism against the charge of heterodoxy. Averroes was certainly a relevant influence on Baconthorpe, and he would sometimes reference Averroes' commentaries in making his own arguments; however, he commonly referenced other theologians, including many of his contemporaries, thus it should not be assumed that Averroes was the primary influence on Baconthorpe's thinking.

Perhaps the most important influence on John Baconthorpe was the Oxford and Paris Condemnations of 1277, in which teaching any of 219 philosophical and theological theses was prohibited by the Bishop, Stephen Tempier. Baconthorpe openly disagreed with many of these prohibited works, such as those by Giles of Rome and Godfrey of Fontaines. This ultimately served to support the doctrines of the church. He paid particular attention to Thomas Aquinas' works on natural philosophy, which Baconthorpe comes to target in many of his arguments. In contrast to Aquinas, Baconthorpe's perspective was that there are two substances, the human body and the eternal soul. Baconthorpe's perspective on angels was similarly influenced by the Condemnations at Paris, in strict opposition to Aquinas.

Many of Baconthorpe's theological discussions focus largely on the form and function of humanity. In accordance with the notion that the human body and the eternal soul are separate entities, he asserted that the soul is the cause of intellect—specifically, that the soul is an intellectual substance which renders the human form intelligible. Despite this, he still believed that free will exists, without decisions necessarily having a cause. Effectively, he believed that souls make their own decisions which are imposed on human bodies, but God maintains a complete knowledge of each soul and each decision that will be made. As a result, he denies the possibility of any material mechanisms being involved in intellect.

== Bibliography ==
- Johannes de Baconthorpe or Anglicus, Quaestiones in quatuor libros Sententiarum (Cremona, 1618).
