= Boetius of Dacia =

13th-century Danish philosopher

Boetius de Dacia (also spelled Boethius de Dacia) was a 13th-century Danish philosopher of the Dominican Order.

== Name ==
The rendering of his name Danske Bo ("Bo the Dane") into Medieval Latin as Boetius de Dacia reflects a medieval practice of using Dacia as the Latin name for Denmark—a result of confusion between Dania (Denmark) and the antique Dacia in near the Black Sea.

== Life and accomplishments ==
Boetius was born in the first half of the 13th century. Not much is known of his early life. The attempt to connect him to known persons from Denmark or Sweden has been unsuccessful. All that is known is that he went to France to teach philosophy at the University of Paris. At the university, he associated with Siger of Brabant. He continued to teach for some time as arts masters rather than quickly moving on to study in the theology faculty or finding non-academic employment. He shared this unusual career path with Siger and others like Roger Bacon and Jean Buridan. He was condemned by Stephen Tempier in 1277 for being a leading member of the Averroist movement. Boetius fled Paris with Siger and appealed to Pope Nicholas III. He was detained at the pontifical curia at Orvieto. He went on to join the Dominicans in Denmark.

Boetius was a follower of Aristotle and Averroes and a leading figure in the modists dogma. He wrote on logic, natural philosophy, metaphysics, and ethics, though some of his works have not survived. Some of his writings include; Modi Significandi, Super librum Perihermenias, and Quaestiones super librum De animalibus, where he comments on these topics at length. His central position was that philosophy had to follow where the arguments led, regardless of their conflict with religious faith. For him, philosophy was the supreme human activity, and in this world only philosophers attained wisdom. In his book On the Highest Good, or On the Life of the Philosopher he offers a fervently Aristotelian description of man's highest good as the rational contemplation of truth and virtue. Among the controversial conclusions that he reached are the impossibility of creation ex nihilo, the eternity of the world and of the human race, and that there could be no resurrection of the dead.

Despite his radical views, Boetius remained a Christian; he attempted to reconcile his religious beliefs with his philosophical positions by assigning the investigation of the world and of human nature to philosophy, while to religion he assigned supernatural revelation and divine miracles. He was condemned for holding the doctrine of "double truth", though he was careful to avoid calling philosophical conclusions that ran contrary to religion true simpliciter: In each branch of knowledge, one must be careful to qualify one's conclusions. The conclusions that the philosopher reaches are true "according to natural causes and principles" (De Aeternitate Mundi, p. 351).

Much like his early life, researchers have not been able to find exactly when Boetius died or what he did after 1277. "The Stams Catalogue" (14th Century) is a collection of literature from Dominican writers that includes Boethius, so there is some evidence suggesting he became a friar after his career in liberal arts.

== Works and translations ==
- Boethii Daci Opera:
  - Modi significandi sive quaestiones super Priscianum maiorem, edited by John Pinborg & Henry Roos with the collaboration of Severino Skovgaard Jensen, Hauniae (Copenhague), G. E. C. Gad, Corpus Philosophorum Danicorum Medii Aevi, 4, 1969.
  - Quaestiones de generatione et corruptione – Quaestiones super libros physicorum, edited by Géza Sajó, Hauniae (Copenhague), G. E. C. Gad, Corpus Philosophorum Danicorum Medii Aevi, 5, 1976.
  - Topica – Opuscola, Pars 1. Quaestiones super Librum Topicorum, edited by Nicolas George Green-Pedersen and John Pinborg; Pars 2. Opuscula: De aeternitate mundi. De summo bono. De somniis, edited by Nicolas George Green-Pedersen, Hauniae (Copenhague), G. E. C. Gad, Corpus Philosophorum Danicorum Medii Aevi, 6, 1976.
  - Quaestiones super IV Meteorologicorum, edited by Gianfranco Fioravanti, Hauniae (Copenhague), G. E. C. Gad, Corpus Philosophorum Danicorum Medii Aevi, 8, 1979.
- Boethius of Dacia, On the Supreme Good; on the Eternity of the World; on Dreams. Edited by John F. Wippel, Mediaeval Sources in Translation. Toronto, Ont. Canada: Pontifical Institute of Mediaeval Studies, 1987.
- Boetius of Dacia, "The Sophisma 'Every Man Is of Necessity an Animal'", in Norman Kretzmann and Eleonore Stump [edd. & trans.] The Cambridge Translations of Medieval Philosophical texts. Volume One: Logic and the Philosophy of Language (1988, Cambridge University Press; ISBN 0-521-28063-X)
