= Jaime Mercant Simó =

Spanish Roman Catholic priest and philosopher (born 1980)

- Born: 6 December 1980 (age 45); Palma, Spain
- Education: Universitat Abat Oliba CEU; Institut Catholique de Toulouse; National University of Distance Education
- Occupations: Roman Catholic priest, philosopher, jurist, theologian and academic

Jaime Mercant Simó (born 6 December 1980) is a Spanish Roman Catholic priest, philosopher, jurist, theologian and academic from Mallorca. He is a professor of philosophy at the Centre for Theological Studies of Mallorca (CETEM) and director of the Diocesan Library of Mallorca.

His scholarly work has focused on Thomism, Karl Rahner, Ramon Llull, natural law and the legal philosophy of the School of Salamanca, particularly Domingo de Soto. His studies of Rahner and Soto have been reviewed in academic philosophy journals including Anuario Filosófico, El Basilisco and Cuadernos Electrónicos de Filosofía del Derecho.

== Education, ministry and academic career ==
Jaime Mercant was born in Palma on 6 December 1980 and was ordained a priest of the Diocese of Mallorca on 14 October 2007.

He received a doctorate in Thomistic Studies, in the field of philosophy, from Universitat Abat Oliba CEU in 2017. His doctoral thesis, directed by Ignacio Andereggen, was entitled La metafísica del conocimiento de Karl Rahner: análisis de «Espíritu en el mundo». According to the Universitat Abat Oliba CEU and the Diocese of Mallorca, the dissertation was awarded cum laude and he subsequently received an extraordinary doctorate prize.

In 2021 he obtained a canonical licentiate in Sacred Theology from the Institut Catholique de Toulouse, specializing in Thomistic tradition and medieval thought. His dissertation examined Ramon Llull's anti-Averroist doctrine of creation and the question of the eternity of the world.

Mercant completed a second doctorate, in Law and Social Sciences with a specialization in legal philosophy, at the National University of Distance Education (UNED) in November 2024. His dissertation, supervised by Juan Antonio Gómez García, was entitled Los fundamentos filosóficos de la doctrina jurídica de Domingo de Soto: análisis del tratado «De iustitia et iure».

At the pastoral level, the diocesan biography states that he serves as archpriest and parish priest of Son Servera, Sant Llorenç des Cardassar and Son Carrió. Since 2020 he has served as professor of philosophy at CETEM and as director of the Diocesan Library of Mallorca. He is also a member of the Thomas Aquinas International Society and of the Association of Church Librarians in Spain.

== Academic work ==
A substantial part of Mercant's early academic work concerned the philosophical foundations of the theology of Karl Rahner. His 2018 book La metafísica del conocimiento de Karl Rahner: análisis de «Espíritu en el mundo» developed the research of his first doctoral dissertation. The work was reviewed by José Ángel García Cuadrado in Anuario Filosófico and by José Luis Pozo Fajarnés in El Basilisco.

García Cuadrado described the book as the result of an extensive doctoral investigation of the philosophical presuppositions of Rahner's thought. He also noted the book's deliberately polemical tone while regarding its substantive criticism as closely argued.

Continuing his critique of Rahnerian doctrine, Mercant published a lengthy article in the Revue Thomiste, divided into two parts, analysing the political theology of Johann Baptist Metz, a renowned disciple of Karl Rahner: "Les principes fondamentaux de la pensée de Johann Baptist Metz: de l’anthropocentrisme chrétien à la théologie politique".

Mercant later turned much of his research toward the legal and political thought of Domingo de Soto. His second doctoral dissertation was published by the Pontifical University of Salamanca in 2025 as La filosofía jurídica de Domingo de Soto, a study of the philosophical foundations of Soto's De iustitia et iure. The book was reviewed in 2026 by Rafael Ramis Barceló in Cuadernos Electrónicos de Filosofía del Derecho. Both in his doctoral thesis and in other works, Jaime Mercant emphasises that Domingo de Soto remains faithful to the teachings of Saint Thomas Aquinas, as is evident in his Thomist conception of law. Furthermore, Mercant highlights the significance of Soto, alongside Vitoria, in the Thomist renewal of the School of Salamanca. In this regard, Mercant analyzes the legal epistemology developed by Domingo de Soto, comparing it with that of Francisco de Vitoria.

In 2026 Mercant published the journal article "Las notas esenciales de la teología hispana" in Araucaria: Revista Iberoamericana de Filosofía, Política, Humanidades y Relaciones Internacionales. In it, he argued for the existence of a specifically Hispanic theological tradition associated with the Spanish Golden Age, Thomism, the School of Salamanca, the Spanish monarchy and empire, and the Council of Trent. In the same year, Mercant published another article in the journal Salmanticensis entitled "La limosna y la causa de los pobres en el planteamiento tomista de Francisco de Vitoria". In this article, the author analyses in detail Vitoria’s Thomist position on almsgiving and its moral obligation, from the perspectives of both charity and natural law.

== Views and public commentary ==
=== Catholic Church debates ===
Mercant has written opinion articles on contemporary debates within the Catholic Church for the Spanish Catholic website InfoCatólica. In November 2022 he argued that the German Synodal Way represented a serious danger of schism and called for a forceful response to developments he considered incompatible with Catholic doctrine.

In October 2023 he defended the five cardinals who had submitted dubia to Pope Francis concerning doctrinal questions raised before the Synod on Synodality.

Following the publication of Fiducia supplicans in December 2023, Mercant criticized the declaration and rejected its provision for non-liturgical blessings of couples in irregular situations and same-sex couples. He called on Francis to withdraw the declaration and invoked a right of resistance to ecclesiastical rules he considered contrary to higher divine or natural law.

In October 2024 he again criticized the Synod on Synodality, arguing that some of its more radical proponents represented a "neo-modernist" tendency within the Church and urging Catholics to resist theological developments he regarded as heterodox.

=== Society of Saint Pius X ===
In February 2026 Mercant entered the debate surrounding planned episcopal consecrations by the Society of Saint Pius X (SSPX). In a 23-point statement, he argued that consecrations without a papal mandate would not constitute mortal sin and would not, in his view, be formally schismatic. He also argued that an automatic excommunication could be declared under canon law but that he would regard such a penalty as null, and expressed the same view regarding the 1988 excommunication of Archbishop Marcel Lefebvre.

FSSPX News, which reproduced Mercant's statement, emphasized that he was a diocesan priest and not a member of the SSPX and stated that the society did not endorse every point of his argument.

The episcopal consecrations subsequently took place at Écône on 1 July 2026. On 2 July, the Dicastery for the Doctrine of the Faith formally described the consecrations as an "act of a schismatic nature" and declared that the consecrating and consecrated bishops had incurred latae sententiae excommunication.

== Selected works ==
- Los fundamentos filosóficos de la teología trascendental de Karl Rahner. Rome: Casa Editrice Leonardo da Vinci, 2017.
- La metafísica del conocimiento de Karl Rahner: análisis de «Espíritu en el mundo». Girona: Documenta Universitaria, 2018.
- With Antonio Livi and Samuele Pinna, Il valore dottrinale dell'insegnamento cristiano dopo il Vaticano II: l'interpretazione della fede cattolica secondo Karl Rahner. Rome: Casa Editrice Leonardo da Vinci, 2019.
- "Les principes fondamentaux de la pensée de Johann Baptist Metz : de l’anthropocentrisme chrétien à la théologie politique". Revue Thomiste, vol. CXXI, fasc. 2-3, pp. 275-312, 371-400.
- "La esencia de la ley según Domingo de Soto". Espíritu: cuadernos del Instituto Filosófico de Balmesiana, vol. 71, no. 163, 2022, pp. 167-193.
- "Domingo de Soto y la renovación tomista". Sapientia, vol. 79, fasc. 174, 2023, pp. 104-121.
- "La raíz de la gnoseología jurídica en Francisco de Vitoria y Domingo de Soto". Scio: Revista de Filosofía, no. 24, 2024, pp. 113-144.
- La filosofía jurídica de Domingo de Soto. Salamanca: UPSA Ediciones, 2025.
- "Convergencias y divergencias entre Domingo de Soto y fray Luis de León a propósito del derecho natural y de gentes", in: José Luis Fuertes Herreros, Manuel Lázaro Pulido, Ángel Poncela González, María Idoya Zorroza Huarte, Diálogos de la dignidad humana: justicia y derechos humanos en la filosofía y cultura del renacimiento y siglo de oro. Madrid: Sindéresis, 2025, pp. 93-112.
- "La limosna y la causa de los pobres en el planteamiento tomista de Francisco de Vitoria". Salmanticensis, vol. 73, fasc. 1, 2026, pp. 33-62.
- "Las notas esenciales de la teología hispana". Araucaria, vol. 28, no. 61, 2026, pp. 404–424.
