= Double truth =

View that religion and philosophy might arrive at contradictory truths

Double-truth theory is "the view that religion and philosophy, as separate sources of knowledge, might arrive at contradictory truths without detriment to either".

== Latin Averroism ==
In medieval Europe, the Church was specifically opposed to "Latin Averroists" (see Averroes), such as the prominent Averroist Siger of Brabant. It sought to halt the spread of certain of Aristotle's doctrines — those that dealt with physical science (see Aristotelian physics, Condemnations of 1210–1277), which the reconquest of Spain and, accordingly, access to the libraries of the Moors had re-introduced into the Latin literate world.

== Neoplatonism and Aristotelianism ==
At the time, much of the theology of the Roman Catholic Church was influenced by Neoplatonic ideas, and Aristotelianism struck many as heretical. Siger and others seem to have conceded this, and to have used the sharp reason/faith distinction that came to be known as "double truth" as a way of legitimizing discussion of Aristotle despite that concession. The teachings of Aristotle came to be accepted as second only to the teachings of the Church. Thomas Aquinas, in his Summa Theologica (1267–73), rejected Neoplatonism and stated that there can be no conflict between reason and faith.

== Revival in the Renaissance ==
Questions remained, and again came to the fore when scientists such as Copernicus made discoveries which seemed to contradict scripture. The doctrine of "double truth" was revived by the scholastics under the rubric "two truths". Thus, according to the scholastics, there was a lesser truth, that the Earth circled the Sun, as Copernicus said, and a greater truth, that when Joshua fought at Jericho it was the Sun, not the Earth, which stood still. The scholastics held that both "truths" were true in their own sphere.

Francis Bacon exemplifies this concept in his book The Advancement of Learning arguing that the fact that revelation was contrary to reason is what gave value to faith.

== Revival in continental philosophy ==
John Sallis, described by Simon Critchley as the first distinctive voice in American continental philosophy, addresses the question of 'double truth', bringing to it both his formative experiences as a student of classical philosophy as well as his commanding understanding of continental philosophy. In his 'Double Truth' (1995) he reframes the problem, suggesting that 'truth is the double of being' (xii).

== See also ==
- Faith and rationality
- Natural theology
- Non-overlapping magisteria
- Postliberal theology
