= Servais-Théodore Pinckaers =

Belgian Catholic theologian (1925–2008)

The Reverend Servais Pinckaers OP
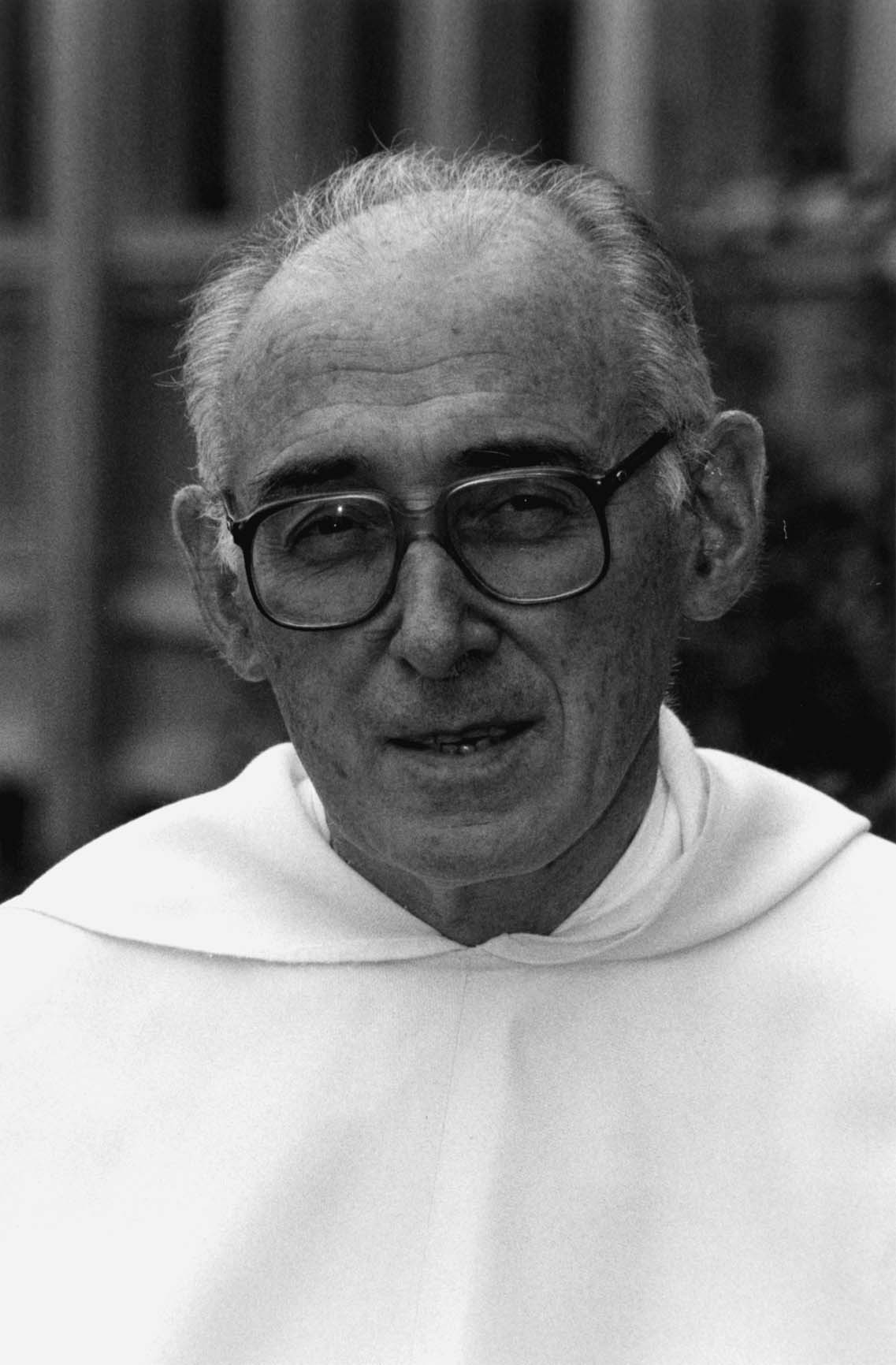
- Servais Pinckaers, OP
- Born: 30 October 1925; Liège, Belgium
- Died: 7 April 2008 (aged 82); Fribourg, Switzerland
- Education: Pontifical University of Saint Thomas Aquinas
- Occupations: Theologian, priest
- Employer: University of Fribourg

Servais-Théodore Pinckaers OP (Liège, 30 October 1925 – Fribourg, 7 April 2008) was a Belgian Dominican priest and noted moral theologian. He has been especially influential in the renewal of a theological and Christological approach to Christian virtue ethics.

== Biography ==
Servais Theodore Pinckaers was born in Liège, Belgium in 1925 and raised in the village of Wonck (now part of the municipality of Bassenge) in Wallonia. In 1945 he entered the Dominican Order and pursued his studies in theology at the Belgian Dominican Studium at La Sarte in Huy, obtaining his license in theology (1952) under the direction of Jérôme Hamer, and writing his thesis on Henri de Lubac's Surnaturel. He pursued doctoral studies at the Pontificium Athenaeum Internationale Angelicum, the future Pontifical University of Saint Thomas Aquinas, attending the classes of such notables as Réginald Garrigou-Lagrange, Paul Philippe and Mario Luigi Ciappi. His dissertation, written under the direction of Louis-Bertrand Gillon, was a study of the medieval theology of hope, entitled "La vertu d'espérance de Pierre Lombard à saint Thomas" (1954).

Upon completion of his studies, Pinckaers returned to the Dominican Studium at La Sarte to teach moral theology from 1954–1965. (He was at La Sarte when in 1958 one of the friars of the community, Dominique Pire, won the Nobel Peace Prize for his labors on behalf of Europe's many war refugees (displaced persons). It was also at La Sarte that Pinckaers undertook his first efforts to renew the contemporary understanding of moral theology, foreshadowing the Vatican Council's call to renewal by several years. The fruits of these labors, which had been published as articles in various places, were subsequently drawn together in his groundbreaking study, Le renouveau de la morale (1964; Preface by Marie-Dominique Chenu). It was also at La Sarte that he wrote the textual analysis and commentary for Questions 6 through 21 of the Prima Secundae (i.e., Aquinas' treatise on human acts) for the Revue des Jeunes's bilingual edition (Latin and French) of the Summa Theologiae (1961 and 1965). Pinckaers referred to his time at La Sarte, both as a student and later as a professor, as the time when he attained the insights that he would subsequently present and develop in his later work. These central insights for the renewal of moral theology are the primacy of the Word of God, as a living Word that speaks to every generation and which is higher than any merely human word; the foundational importance of the fathers of the Church, especially Augustine; and the lasting value of St. Thomas' method and insights.

After the Studium at La Sarte was closed in 1965, Pinckaers went to the Dominican priory at Liège and engaged in pastoral ministry for the next eight years, years that shaped the pastoral concern expressed in much of his work. In 1975, he was called to fill the French-language chair in fundamental moral theology at the University of Fribourg in Switzerland, where he taught for the next twenty-five years. As emeritus professor he remained in Fribourg, in residence at the international Dominican priory of St. Albert the Great (the Albertinum), until his death on 7 April 2008 at age eighty-two.

== Career ==
His most well-known work in English is The Sources of Christian Ethics (1995), which has been well received by a varied cross-section of the Church in America and in English-speaking countries. Other works in English include: his introduction to moral thought entitled Morality: the Catholic View (2001; with Preface by Alasdair MacIntyre); The Pinckaers Reader: Renewing Thomistic Moral Theology (2005), a collection of his most significant essays, subsequent to the publication of The Sources of Christian Ethics. Moreover, of special interest are the essay, "The Sources of the Ethics of St. Thomas Aquinas" (in The Ethics of Aquinas, 2002), and his popular presentation of the Christian call to flourishing through the Beatitudes, The Pursuit of Happiness: Living the Beatitudes (1998).

Pinckaers labored to demonstrate a complete vision of Catholic theology. He has argued that the academic departmentalization of theological disciplines risks falsifying the nature of theology. Returning to Aquinas' model and insight by drawing from scriptural, patristic, magisterial and contemporary sources, he argued that an interconnection of philosophical, moral, spiritual, and theological perspectives is needed in order to do justice to Christian agency and the interplay of nature and grace, law and prudence, human and divine interaction in the pursuit of Christian flourishing. With attention turned to fully Christian moral agency, his 25 books and over 300 articles aim either at academic or popular audiences.

His more academic works include a large number of articles (in journals such as Nova et Vetera and Revue thomiste) and the following books: Ce qu'on ne peut jamais faire. La question des actes intrinsèquement mauvais: Histoire et discussion (1986); L'Evangile et la morale (1991); La morale catholique (1991); and La vie selon l'Esprit: Essai de théologie spirituelle selon saint Paul et saint Thomas d'Aquin (1996). In 2001, he published a new textual analysis and commentary for the first five questions of the Prima Secundae (that is, Aquinas' treatise on happiness) for the second edition of the Revue des Jeunes bilingual edition (Latin and French) of the Summa Theologiae (La béatitude [Ia-IIae, qq. 1–5]).

His more popular works include an even larger number of articles for journals such as Sources and Kerit, as well as the following books: La faim de l'Evangile (1977); La quête du Bonheur (1979); La justice évangélique (1986); La Prière chrétienne (1989). A list of books and a selection of his articles are found below.

After a period of inactivity following a heart attack, Pinckaers published A la découverte de Dieu dans les Confessions (2002), the first of a two volume study of Augustine whose general title is: En promenade avec saint Augustin. The second volume. yet forthcoming in 2015, is on the Trinity. He also published Plaidoyer pour la vertu (2007), which was one of three works to receive an honorable mention as runners up for the Grand prix catholique de littérature for 2007. In the year before his death, Pinckaers prepared several texts for publication, including Passions et vertu (2009).

== Honours ==
Pinckaers also served on several Vatican commissions, including the commission that wrote the Catechism of the Catholic Church, contributing to the moral section, and the preparatory commissions for the encyclical Veritatis Splendor. From 1989 to 2005 he was a consultant to the Congregation for Catholic Education. From 1992 until 1997 he was a member of the International Theological Commission.

In 1990, he was named Magister Sacrae Theologiae, the highest academic honor bestowed by the Dominican Order. In 2000, he received an honorary doctorate in "Theology of Marriage and Family" from the Pontifical Lateran University in Rome.

== Chronological overview ==
- 1925: Born in Liège (30 October). Raised in the village of Wonck (now part of Bassenge) in Wallonia, Belgium
- 1945: Entered the Dominican order in Belgium (after having studied one year in the diocesan seminary)
- 1946–1952: Studied philosophy and theology at the Dominican College of Theology at La Sarte, Huy, Belgium
- 1951–1952: Sacred Theology Licentiate (STL) under the direction of Jérôme Hamer. Title: "Le Surnaturel du P. De Lubac"
- 26 March 1951 (Easter Monday): Ordained priest at the Dominican priory, La Sarte
- 1952–1954: Studied for a doctorate in sacred theology at the Pontifical University of Saint Thomas Aquinas (Angelicum) in Rome
- 1954: Finished his dissertation, directed by Louis-Bertrand Gillon, titled: "La Vertu d'espérance de Pierre Lombard à St. Thomas d'Aquin" (Rome: Angelicum, STD thesis)
- 1954–1965: Professor of Fundamental Moral Theology, Dominican College, La Sarte, Huy
- 1965–1972: Pastoral work (preaching and spiritual direction) at the Dominican priory in Liège
  - Prior of the community from 1966–1972
- 1972–1973: Invited Professor (Professeur extraordinaire) at the Pontifical Faculty of Theology, University of Fribourg
- 1973–1975: Return to pastoral work at the Dominican priory in Liège
- 1975–1997: Professor of fundamental moral theology (French language chair) at the Pontifical Faculty of Theology, University of Fribourg
- 1975: Co-founder of Sources, with Guy Bedouelle, Georges Cottier, and Raphaël Oechslin
- 1983–1990 and 1996–1999: Prior of the Albertinum
- 1989–1991: Dean of the Faculty of Theology, University of Fribourg
- 1989–2005: Consultant to the Congregation for Catholic Education (named by Pope John Paul II in June 1989)
  - Served on the commission that drafted the Catechism of the Catholic Church (1992), contributing to the moral section
  - Served on the preparatory commissions for the encyclical Veritatis splendor (1993)
- 1990: Named Magister Sacrae Theologiae, the highest academic honor bestowed by the Dominican Order
- 1990: Festschrift for his 65th birthday, Novitas et Veritas Vitae: Aux sources du renouveau de la morale chrétienne (edited by Carlos-Josaphat Pinto de Oliveira, OP, Fribourg/Paris: Ed. Universitaires/Cerf, 1991)
- 1992–1997: Member of the International Theological Commission, Vatican
- 20 June 1996: Farewell Conference (Leçon d'adieu), University of Fribourg
  - As emeritus professor, he continued to teach at the university until his successor (Jean-Louis Bruguès, OP, later Archbishop, Vatican Archivist, and Librarian), took up the chair in Fall 1997
- 2000: Honorary doctorate in "Theology of Marriage and Family" from the Pontifical Lateran University, Rome (in the presence of Cardinal Camillo Ruini, Grand Chancellor of the University and Cardinal Angelo Sodano, Secretary of State for the Vatican)
- 2005: Colloquium honoring him on his 80th birthday, "Making all Things New in Christ". Festschrift: Renouveler toutes choses en Christ. Vers un renouveau thomiste de la théologie morale. Hommage à Servais Pinckaers, OP (edited by Michael Sherwin, OP, and Craig Steven Titus, Fribourg: Academic Press, 2009)

== Works ==
=== Books ===
- Notes et appendices de: S. Thomas d'Aquin, Les actes humains (Summa Theologica, Ia–IIae, 6–17), vol. I. Editions de La Revue des jeunes, Paris, Cerf, 1961.
- Le renouveau de la morale. Etudes pour une morale fidèle à ses sources et à sa mission présente, Preface by M. D. Chenu, Tournai, Casterman, 1964.
- Traduction et commentaires de: S. Thomas d'Aquin, Les actes humains (Ia–IIae, 18–21), vol. II. Editions de La Revue des jeunes, Paris, Cerf, 1965.
- La faim de l'Evangile, Paris, Téqui, 1977.
- La quête du bonheur, Paris, Téqui, 1979.
  - English translation: The Pursuit of Happiness—God's Way: Living the Beatitudes, New York, Alba House, 1998.
- La Morale: somma di doveri? legge d'amore? (trans. P. Cozzupoli), Rome, Edizioni "La Guglia", 1982.
- Les sources de la morale chrétienne. Sa méthode, son contenu, son histoire, Fribourg, Editions Universitaires, 1985/1993.
  - English translation: The Sources of Christian Ethics, (trans. by M. T. Noble), Washington, D.C., The Catholic University of America Press, 1995.
- La justice évangélique, Paris, Téqui, 1986.
- Ce qu'on ne peut jamais faire. La question des actes intrinsèquement mauvais. Histoire et discussion, Fribourg, Editions Universitaires, 1986.
  - English translation of ch. II: "A Historical Perspective on Intrinsically Evil Acts [1982]", ch. 11, in: The Pinckaers Reader, pp. 185–235.
- La prière chrétienne, Fribourg, Editions Universitaires, 1989.
- La grâce de Marie. Commentaire de l'Ave Maria, Paris, Médiaspaul, 1989.
- L'Evangile et la morale, Fribourg, Editions Universitaires, 1989.
- La morale catholique, Paris, Cerf, 1991.
  - English translation: Morality: The Catholic View (preface by Alasdair MacIntyre; trans. Michael Sherwin), South Bend, Ind., St. Augustine's Press, 2001/2003.
- Pour une lecture de Veritatis splendor, Paris, Cahiers de l'Ecole Cathédrale, Mame, 1995.
  - English translation: "An Encyclical for the Future: Veritatis splendor", in: Veritatis Splendor and the Renewal of Moral Theology (J. A. DiNoia and Romanus Cessario, ed.), Chicago: Scepter, 1999.
- La vie selon l'Esprit. Essai de théologie spirituelle selon saint Paul et saint Thomas d'Aquin, Luxembourg, Saint-Paul, 1996.
- Un grand chant d'amour. La Passion selon saint Matthieu, Saint-Maur, Parole et Silence, 1997.
- Au Cœur de l'évangile, le "Notre Père", Saint-Maur, Parole et Silence, 1999.
- La Spiritualité du martyre, Versailles, Editions Saint-Paul, 2000.
  - English translation: The Spirituality of Martyrdom, trans. Patrick M. Clark and Annie Hounsokou. Washington D.C., The Catholic University of America Press, 2016.
- A l'école de l'admiration, Versailles, Editions Saint-Paul, 2001.
- Traduction et commentaire de: S. Thomas d'Aquin, La béatitude (Somme théologique, Ia–IIae, 1–5), Editions de La Revue des jeunes, Paris, Cerf, 2001.
- En Promenade avec saint Augustin. A la découverte de Dieu dans les Confessions, Paris, Parole et Silence, 2002.
- The Pinckaers Reader: Renewing Thomistic Moral Theology (J. Berkman et C. S. Titus, ed.), Washington, D.C., The Catholic University of America Press, 2005.
- Plaidoyeur pour la vertu, Paris, Parole et Silence, 2007.
- Passions et vertu, Paris, Parole et Silence, 2009.
  - English translation: Passions and Virtue, trans. Benedict M. Guevin OSB. Washington D.C.: The Catholic University of America Press, 2015.
- En Promenade avec saint Augustin. De Trinitate. Volume 2. Parole et Silence, Forthcoming.
- L'attrait de la parole: sur les chemins de la morale chrétienne. Parole et Silence, Forthcoming.

=== Articles (selection since 1990) ===
- "Les passions et la morale", RSPT 1990, pp. 379–391.
  - trans.: "Reappropriating Aquinas' Account of the Passions [1990]", ch. 13, in: The Pinckaers Reader, pp. 273–287.
- "La méthode théologique et la morale contemporaine", Seminarium 29:2, 1991, pp. 313–327.
- "La vive flamme d'amour chez S.Jean de la Croix et S. Thomas d'Aquin", Carmel 63:4, 1991, pp. 3–21.
- "L'instinct et l'Esprit au coeur de l'éthique chrétienne", in: Novitas et Veritas vitae. Aux sources du renouveau de la morale chrétienne (C. J. Pinto de Oliveira, ed.), Fribourg, 1991, pp. 213–223.
  - trans.: "Morality and the Movement of the Holy Spirit: Aquinas's Doctrine of Instinctus [1991]", ch. 20, in: The Pinckaers Reader, pp. 385–395.
- "Nature-surnature chez Saint Thomas d'Aquin", in: Ethique et natures (E. Fuchs et M. Hunyadi, ed.), Geneva, Fides et labor, 1992, pp. 19–28.
  - trans.: "Aquinas on Nature and the Supernatural [1992]", ch. 18, in: The Pinckaers Reader, pp. 359–368.
- "La voie spirituelle du bonheur", in: Ordo sapientiae et amoris. (C. J. Pinto de Oliveira, ed.), 1993.
  - trans.: "Aquinas's Pursuit of Beatitude: From the Commentary on the Sentences to the Summa Theologiae", ch. 6, in: The Pinckaers Reader, 2005, pp. 93–114.
- "L'enseignement de la théologie morale et saint Thomas", in: Saint Thomas au XXe siècle. Actes du colloque du centenaire de la Revue thomiste, Paris, Saint-Paul, 1993.
- "La conscience et l'erreur", Communio 18, July 1993, pp. 23–35.
- "L'Enseignement de la théologie morale à Fribourg", Revue Thomiste, 93, 1993, pp. 430–442.
  - trans.: "Dominican Moral Theology in the 20th Century [1993]", ch. 5, in: The Pinckaers Reader, pp. 73–89.
- "Redécouvrir la vertu", Sapientia 51, 1996, pp. 151–163.
  - trans.: "The Role of Virtue in Moral Theology [1996]", ch. 14, in: The Pinckaers Reader, pp. 288–303.
- "Les anges, garants de l'expérience spirituelle selon saint Thomas", Rivista teologica di Lugano 1, 1996, pp. 179–191.
- "Linee per un rinnovamento evangelico della morale", Annales theologici 10, 1996, pp. 3–68.
- "La Parole de Dieu et la morale", Le Supplément de la vie spirituelle 200, March 1997, pp. 21–38.
- "Thérèse de l'Enfant Jésus, Docteur de l'Église", Revue Thomiste 97, July 1997, pp. 512–524.
  - trans.: "Thérèse of the Child Jesus, Doctor of the Church", Josephinum Journal of Theology 5 [Winter–Spring 1998]: pp. 26–40.
- "Morale humaine et morale chrétienne", Cahiers Saint-Dominique 250, December 1997, pp. 15–24.
- "La Loi nouvelle, sommet de la morale chrétienne, selon l'encyclique 'Veritatis splendor'", in: Gesu Cristo, Legge vivente e personale della Santa Chiesa. Atti del IX Colloquio Internazionale di Teologia di Lugano, Lugano, 1996.
  - trans.: "The New Law in 'Veritatis splendor'", Josephinum Journal of Theology 3 [1996].
- "Conscience and the Virtue of Prudence", in: Crisis of Conscience (John Haas, ed.), New York, 1996.
  - trans.: "Conscience and the Virtue of Prudence [1996]", ch. 17, in: The Pinckaer Reader, pp. 342–355.
- "La defense par Capreolus de la doctrine de S. Thomas sur les vertus", in: Jean Capreolus et son temps Paris: Cerf, 1997.
  - trans.: "Capreolus' Defense of Aquinas: A Medieval Debate about the Virtues and Gifts [1997]", ch. 15, in: The Pinckaers Reader, pp. 304–320.
- "Entretien avec le Père Servais Pinckaers", Montmartre June–July 1998, pp. 21–24.
- "The Desire for Happiness as a Way to God", Maynooth University Record, 1998. pp. 33–48.
  - trans.: "Beatitude and the Beatitudes in Aquinas's Summa Theologiae [1998]", ch. 7, in: The Pinckaers Reader, pp. 115–129.
- "Le retour de la Loi nouvelle en morale", in: Praedicando et docendo: Mélanges offerts au Père Liam Walsh (B. Hallensleben et G. Vergauwen, ed.), Fribourg, Editions Universitaires, 1998, 281–293.
  - trans.: "The Return of the New Law to Moral Theology [1998]", The Irish Theological Quarterly, 64, 1999, pp. 3–15, and ch. 18, in: The Pinckaers Reader, pp. 369–384.
- "Le désir de bonheur et Dieu", in: Dieu, la bonne nouvelle (Commission Théologique Internationale, ed.) Paris, Les éditions du cerf, 1999, pp. 21–28.
- "L'expérience de Dieu dans la vie chrétienne", in: Dieu, la bonne nouvelle (Commission Théologique Internationale, ed.) Paris, Les éditions du cerf, 1999, pp. 107–121.
- "The Place of Philosophy in Moral Theology", L'Osservatore Romano, June 16, 1999, pp. 14–15.
  - re-edited version): "The Place of Philosophy in Moral Theology", in: Faith and Reason (Timothy L. Smith, ed.) South Bend, Ind., St. Augustine Press, 2001, pp. 10–20; and ch. 4, in: The Pinckaers Reader, pp. 64–72.
- "My Sources", Communio 26, 1999, pp. 913–915.
- "La morale et l'Eglise Corps du Christ", Revue Thomiste, 100, 2000, pp. 239–258.
  - trans.: "The Body of Christ. The Eucharistic and Ecclesial Context of Aquinas's Ethics [2000]", ch. 2, in: The Pinckaers Reader, pp. 26–45.
- "The Sources of the Ethics of St. Thomas Aquinas", in: The Ethics of St. Thomas Aquinas (Stephen J. Pope, ed.), Washington, D.C.: Georgetown University Press, 2002, pp. 17–29.
