= Revue thomiste =

Philosophical and theological journal

- Editor: Philippe-Marie Margelidon
- Categories: Philosophy, theology
- Frequency: Quarterly
- Founder: Marie Thomas Coconnier, Ambroise Gardeil and Pierre Mandonnet
- First issue: 1893
- Country: France
- Based in: Toulouse
- Language: French
- Website: https://www.revuethomiste.fr
- ISSN: 0035-4295

Revue thomiste (lit. 'Thomist review') is a quarterly theological and philosophical journal founded in March 1893 by the Dominican priests Marie Thomas Coconnier, Ambroise Gardeil and Pierre Mandonnet following the 1879 exhortation by Pope Leo XIII to renew Thomistic studies through his encyclical Aeterni Patris.

The creation of the journal was supported by father Marie-Joseph Lagrange. A peer-reviewed magazine, it is published quarterly at Toulouse. The publication asserted a strong influence on neo-Thomistic philosophy and theology. Relevant figures such as Étienne Gilson or Jacques Maritain took part on its debates.

Revue thomiste also works in the compilation of a series of texts, the Bibliothèque de la Revue thomiste, published between 1938 and 1970 by Desclée de Brouwer and by Parole et Silence since 2004.

== Directors ==
- 1893–1908: Marie Thomas Coconnier, OP.
- 1908–1920: Ambroise Montagne, OP.
- 1920–1923: Raymond Cathala, o.p.
- 1924–1925: André Gigon, OP.
- 1926–1928: Marie-Vincent Bernadot, OP.
- 1928–1929: Marie-François Cazes, OP.
- 1930–1936: Paul Aune, OP.
- 1936–1954: Marie-Michel Labourdette, OP.
- 1954–1990: Marie-Vincent Leroy, OP.
- 1991–2009: Serge-Thomas Bonino, OP.
- 2009–2010: Emmanuel Perrier, OP.
- 2011–2012: Serge-Thomas Bonino, OP.
- Since 2012: Philippe-Marie Margelidon, OP.

== Bibliography ==
- Camille de Belloy; Ambroise Gardeil (2008). "Les études dominicaines et les besoins présents en France: Rapport sur les Études présenté au Chapitre de la Province de France de 1901". Revue des sciences philosophiques et théologiques (in French). 92 (3): 433–459.
- Nicole Bériou; André Vauchez; Michel Zink, eds. (2017). Les dominicains en France (XIII-XX): Actes du colloque international du 10 au 12 décembre 2015, organisé par l’Académie des Inscriptions et Belles-Lettres et la Province dominicaine de France (in French). Paris: Éditions du Cerf. ISBN 978-2-204-12242-9.
- Serge-Thomas Bonino, ed. (1994). Saint Thomas au XXe siècle: Actes du colloque du Centenaire de la "Revue thomiste". 25-28 mars 1993 (in French). Paris: Éditions Saint-Paul. ISBN 978-2-85049-571-7.
- Henry Donneaud (1991). La Fondation de la Revue thomiste (1893) (in French). Bordeaux: Université Michel-de-Montaigne.
- Henry Donneaud (1993). "Les Cinquante premières années de la Revue thomiste". Revue thomiste (in French). 93: 5–25. Archived from the original on 2015-09-10..
- Henry Donneaud (1994). "Les origines fribourgeoises de la Revue thomiste". Mémoire dominicaine (in French). 5: 43–60.
- Henry Donneaud; Augustin Laffay; Bernard Montagnes (2015). La Province dominicaine de Toulouse, XIX-XX: une histoire intellectuelle et spirituelle (in French). Paris: Éditions Karthala. ISBN 978-2-8111-1487-9.
