= Condemnations of 1210–1277 =

Medieval restrictions questioning Aristotelianism

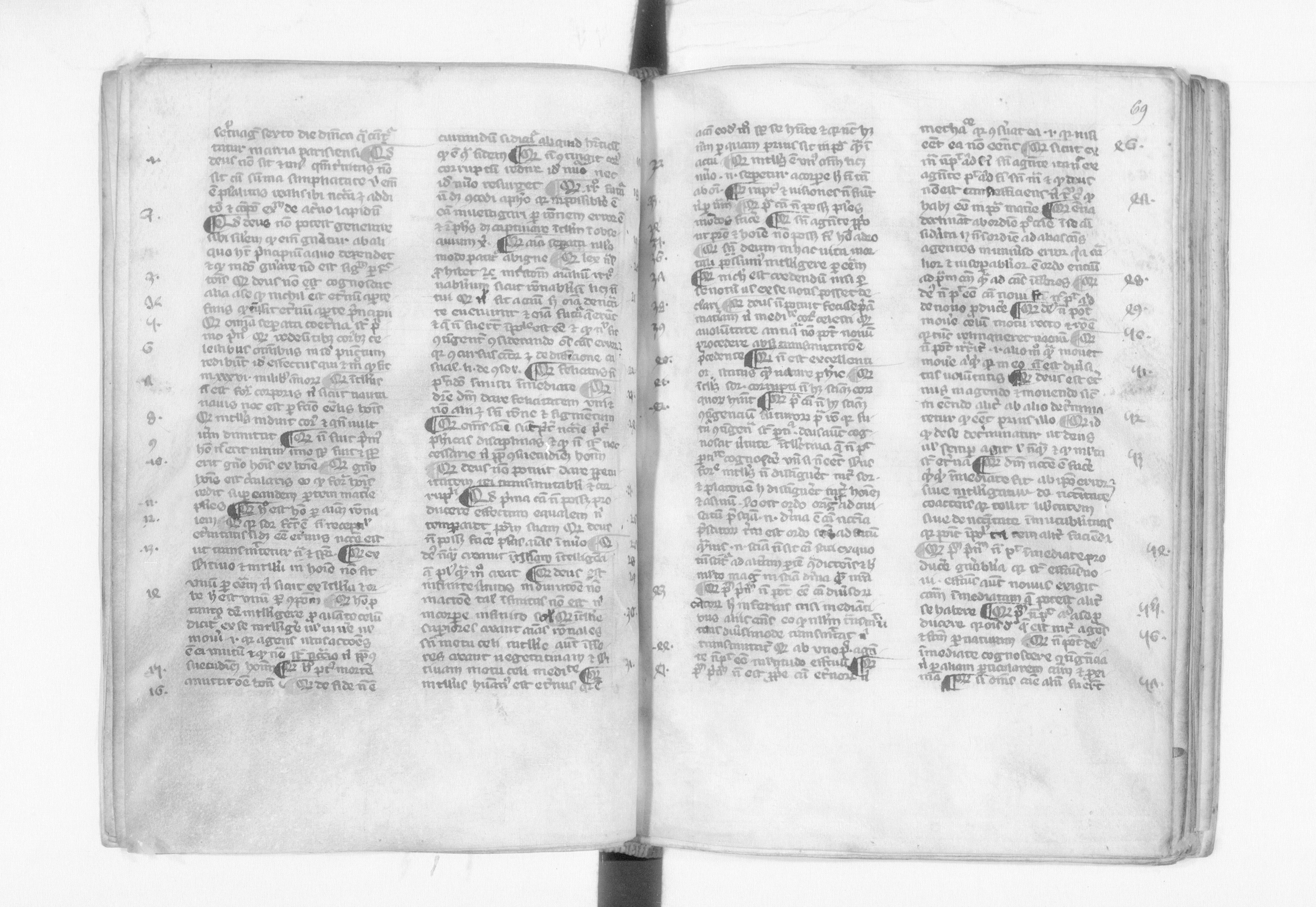
Articles of the condemnation of 1277 (Articuli damnati anno 1277)

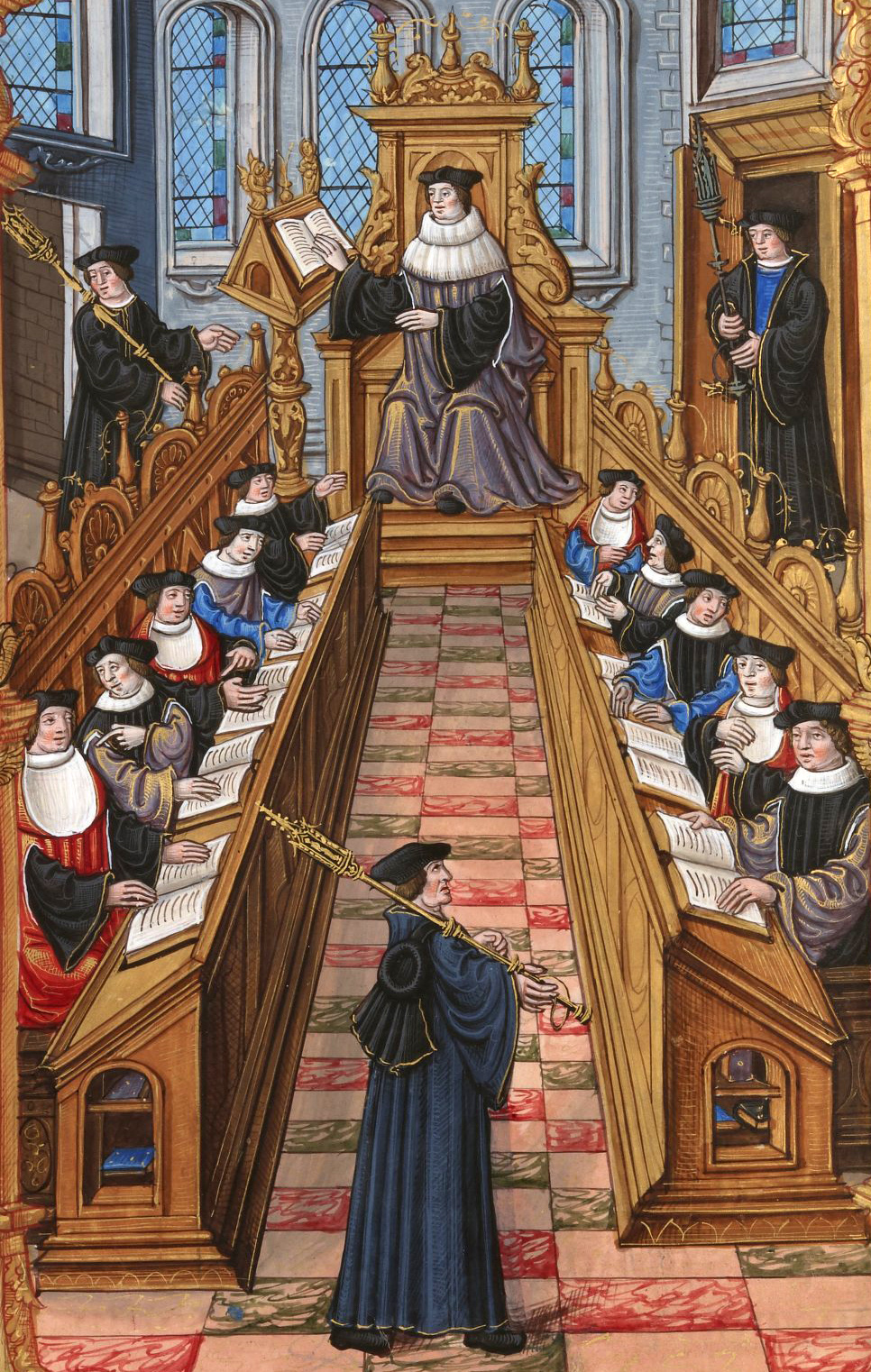
A 16th-century miniature showing a meeting of doctors at the University of Paris

The Condemnations at the medieval University of Paris were enacted to restrict certain teachings as being heretical. These included a number of medieval theological teachings, but most importantly the physical treatises of Aristotle. The investigations of these teachings were conducted by the Bishops of Paris. The Condemnations of 1277 are traditionally linked to an investigation requested by Pope John XXI, although whether he actually supported drawing up a list of condemnations is unclear.

Approximately sixteen lists of censured theses were issued by the University of Paris during the 13th and 14th centuries. Most of these lists of propositions were put together into systematic collections of prohibited articles. Of these, the Condemnations of 1277 are considered particularly important by those historians who consider that they encouraged scholars to question the tenets of Aristotelian science. From this perspective, some historians maintain that the condemnations had positive effects on the development of science, perhaps even representing the beginnings of modern science.

== Condemnation of 1210 ==
The Condemnation of 1210 was issued by the provincial synod of Sens, which included the Bishop of Paris as a member (at the time Pierre II de la Chapelle). The writings of a number of medieval scholars were condemned, apparently for pantheism, and it was further stated that: "Neither the books of Aristotle on natural philosophy or their commentaries are to be read at Paris in public or secret, and this we forbid under penalty of excommunication." However, this had only local force, and its application was further restricted to the Arts faculty at the University of Paris. Theologians were therefore left free to read the prohibited works, the titles of which were not even specified. Alexander of Aphrodisias was probably among the Aristotelian commentators whose influence was targeted.

The University of Toulouse (founded in 1229) tried to capitalise on the situation by advertising itself to students: "Those who wish to scrutinize the bosom of nature to the inmost can hear the books of Aristotle which were forbidden at Paris." However, whether the prohibition had actually had an effect on the study of the physical texts in Paris is unclear. English scholars, including Robert Grosseteste and Roger Bacon, studied at Paris when they could have chosen to study at the University of Oxford, where the works could still be discussed in public. It is assumed that at the least they continued to be read in Paris in private, and there are also signs that their discussion had become public by 1240.

== Condemnation of 1270 ==
By 1270, the ban on Aristotle's natural philosophy was a dead letter. Nevertheless, the Bishop of Paris, Étienne Tempier, convened a meeting of conservative theologians and in December 1270 banned the teaching of certain Aristotelian and Averroist doctrines at Paris. Thirteen propositions were listed as false and heretical, some relating to Averroes' doctrine of the soul and the doctrine of monopsychism, and others directed against Aristotle's theory of God as a passive unmoved mover. The banned propositions included:

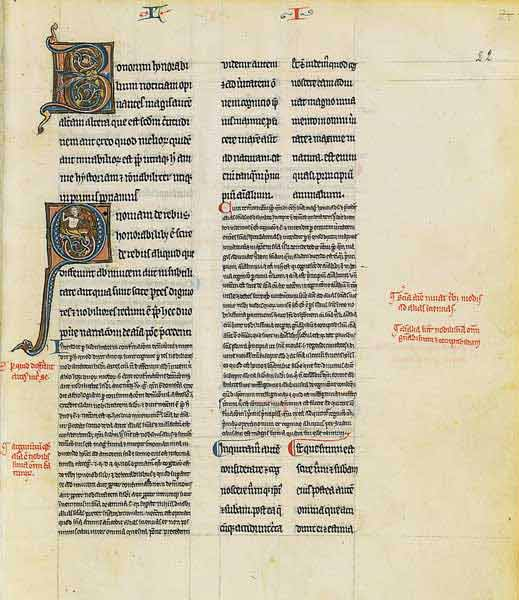
Late-13th-century French manuscript of Averroes' commentary on Aristotle's De Anima

- "That there is numerically one and the same intellect for all humans".
- "That the soul separated [from the body] by death cannot suffer from bodily fire".
- "That God cannot grant immortality and incorruption to a mortal and corruptible thing".
- "That God does not know singulars" (i.e., individual objects or creatures).
- "That God does not know things other than Himself".
- "That human acts are not ruled by the providence of God".
- "That the world is eternal".
- "That there was never a first human".

Those who "knowingly" taught or asserted them as true would suffer automatic excommunication, with the implied threat of the medieval Inquisition if they persisted. It is not known which of these statements were "taught knowingly" or "asserted" by teachers at Paris, although Siger of Brabant and his radical Averroist colleagues at the Faculty of Arts were targets. Evidently, the radical masters had taught that Aristotle put forward controversial propositions—which according to the Averroists would have been true at least in philosophy, even if rejected in theology—the doctrine of two truths—and questions such as free will and the immortality of the soul were doubtless subject to scholarly debate between masters and students. However, it seems "inconceivable" that any teacher would deny God's Providence.

== Condemnation of 1277 ==
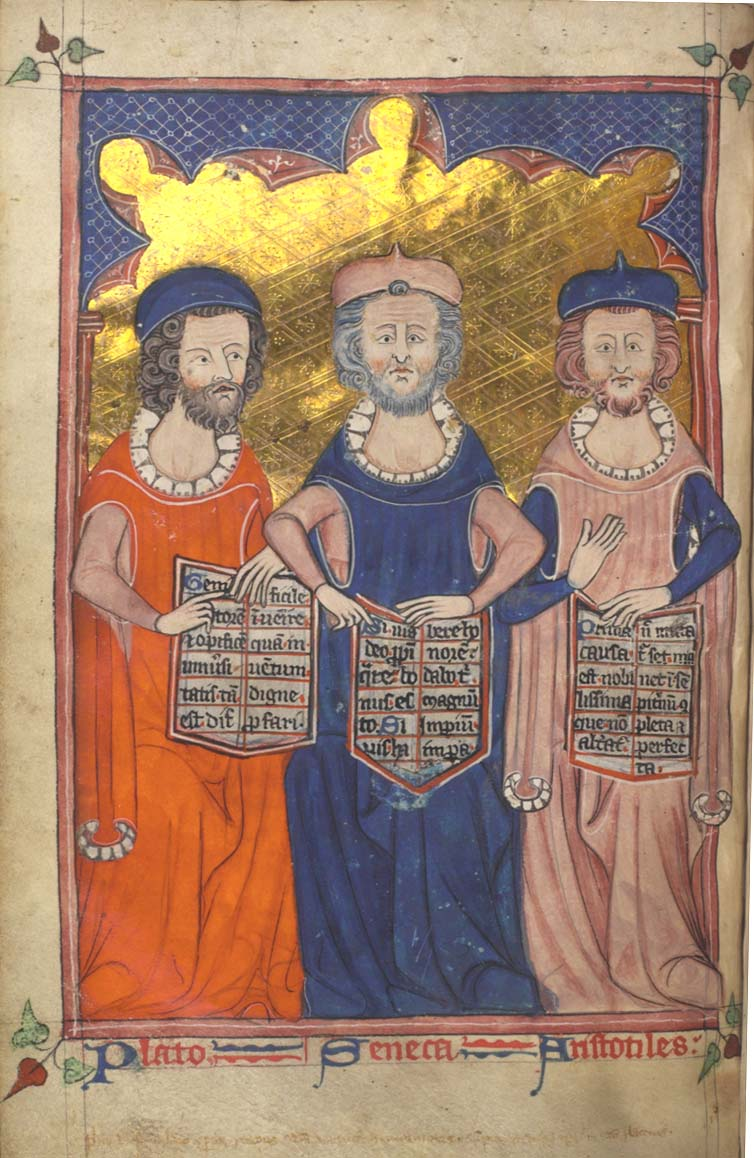
Devotional and Philosophical Writings, c. 1330. Prior to the condemnations, many scholars relied heavily on Aristotle (right).

The chain of events leading up to Bishop Tempier's condemnation of 1277 is still not entirely clear. The Catholic Encyclopedia records that the theologians of the University of Paris had been very uneasy due to the antagonism that existed between Christian dogmas and certain Peripatetic doctrines. According to the historian Edward Grant, the theologians desired to condemn Aristotle's teachings on the eternity of the world and the unicity of the intellect.

On 18 January 1277, Pope John XXI instructed Bishop Tempier to investigate the complaints of the theologians. "Not only did Tempier investigate but in only three weeks, on his own authority, he issued a condemnation of 219 propositions drawn from many sources, including, apparently, the works of Thomas Aquinas, some of whose ideas found their way onto the list." The list published on 7 March condemned a great number of "errors", some of which emanated from the astrology, and others from the philosophy of the Peripatetics. These included:

- 9. "That there was no first man, nor will there be a last; on the contrary, there always was and always will be generation of man from man."
- 49. "That God could not move the heavens with rectilinear motion; and the reason is that a vacuum would remain."
- 87. "That the world is eternal as to all the species contained in it; and that time is eternal, as are motion, matter, agent, and recipient; and because the world is from the infinite power of God, it is impossible that there be novelty in an effect without novelty in the cause."

The penalty for anyone teaching or listening to the listed errors was excommunication, "unless they turned themselves in to the bishop or the chancellor within seven days, in which case the bishop would inflict proportionate penalties." The condemnation sought to stop the Master of Arts teachers from interpreting the works of Aristotle in ways that were contrary to the beliefs of the Church. In addition to the 219 errors, the condemnation also covered Andreas Capellanus's De amore, and unnamed or unidentified treatises on geomancy, necromancy, witchcraft, or fortunetelling.

The condemnation of 1277 was later partially annulled "insofar as the teachings of Thomas Aquinas would seem to be implied."

=== Assessment ===
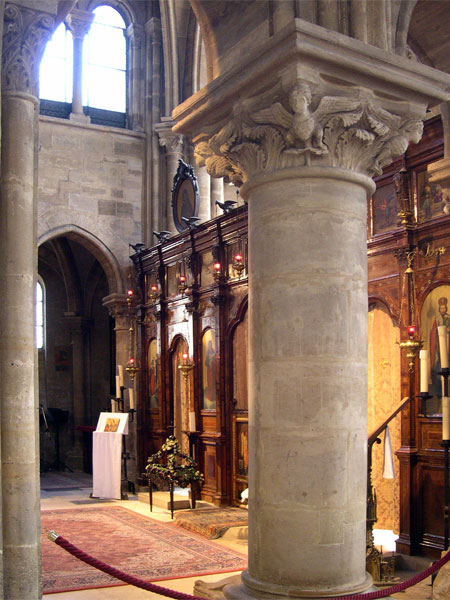
Interior of the Saint-Julien-le-Pauvre, the former site of the School of Theology and Arts and later associated with the Faculty of Arts at the University of Paris

The long list has often been labelled as not being particularly organised, and that it is "broad in scope to the point of confusion." However, the order on the roll has been attributed to factors such as the order in which the errors appeared in the examined works. The list was reorganised shortly after 1277, possibly to facilitate its use in the academic community. In the 20th century, the articles were once again reorganised by Dominican historian Pierre Mandonnet, numbering and distinguishing the 179 philosophical theses from the 40 theological ones. The list was summarised into groupings and further explained by John F. Wippel. The Stanford Encyclopedia of Philosophy also emphasised that "Tempier's theses express positions that cannot be maintained in light of revealed truth, and for this reason are each followed by the qualification 'error'."

Another problem was that Tempier did not identify the targets of his condemnation, merely indicating that it was directed against unspecified members of the Arts Faculty in Paris. Siger of Brabant and Boethius of Dacia have been singled out as the most prominent targets of the 1277 censure, even though their names are not found in the document itself, appearing instead in the rubrics of only two of the many manuscripts that preserve the condemnation. These two scholars were important proponents of the Averroist movement. The ground-breaking study by the historian Roland Hissette has shown that many of the censured propositions appear to have come from Aristotle, from Arab philosophers, or from "the philosophers" (i.e. other Greek philosophers).

The role that Pope John XXI played in the lead-up to the condemnations is a more recent point of discussion. Because the papal letter preceded Tempier's condemnation by only about six weeks, the traditional assumption was that Tempier had acted on papal initiative, and in an overzealous and hasty way. However, more than forty days after Tempier produced his list, another papal letter gives no indication that the Pope was as yet aware of Tempier's action, and seems to suggest otherwise. It is therefore possible that Tempier had already been preparing his condemnations prior to receiving the Pope's first letter. The Pope himself had not played any direct role in the condemnations, having merely requested an investigation, and one scholar has argued that there was "less than enthusiastic papal approval of the bishop of Paris' actions."

=== Effects ===
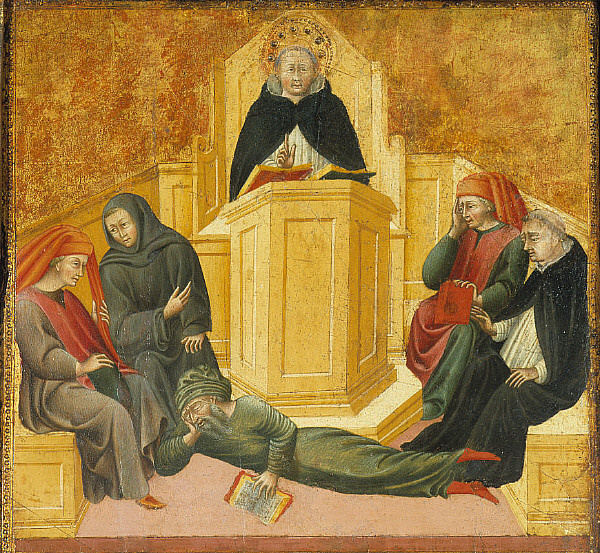
Giovanni di Paolo's St. Thomas Aquinas Confounding Averroës. Tempier investigated the works of both Aquinas and Averroes.

Pierre Duhem considered that these condemnations "destroyed certain essential foundations of Peripatetic physics". Although the Aristotelian system viewed propositions such as the existence of a vacuum to be ridiculously untenable, belief in Divine Omnipotence sanctioned them as possible, whilst waiting for science to confirm them as true. From at least 1280 onward, many masters at Paris and Oxford admitted that the laws of nature are certainly opposed to the production of empty space, but that the realisation of such a space is not, in itself, contrary to reason. These arguments gave rise to the branch of mechanical science known as dynamics.

Pierre Duhem and Edward Grant state this caused a break from Aristotle's work and forced the teachers of the time to believe Aristotle's work imperfect. According to Duhem, "if we must assign a date for the birth of modern science, we would, without doubt, choose the year 1277 when the bishop of Paris solemnly proclaimed that several worlds could exist, and that the whole of heavens could, without contradiction, be moved with a rectilinear motion."

Duhem's view has been extremely influential in the historiography of medieval science, and opened it up as a serious academic discipline. "Duhem believed that Tempier, with his insistence of God's absolute power, had liberated Christian thought from the dogmatic acceptance of Aristotelianism, and in this way marked the birth of modern science." The condemnations certainly had a positive effect on science, but scholars disagree over their relative influence. Historians in the field no longer fully endorse his view that modern science started in 1277. Edward Grant's views on the subject perhaps approximate closest Duhem's, though Grant's are more refined and benefit from the greater materials available to him. What historians do agree upon is that the condemnations allowed science "to consider possibilities that the great philosopher never envisioned." According to the historian of science Richard Dales, they "seem definitely to have promoted a freer and more imaginative way of doing science."

Others point out that in philosophy, a critical and skeptical reaction followed on from the Condemnations 1277. Since the theologians had asserted that Aristotle had erred in theology, and pointed out the negative consequences of uncritical acceptance of his ideas, scholastic philosophers such as Duns Scotus and William of Ockham (both Franciscan friars) believed he might also be mistaken in matters of philosophy. The Scotist and Ockhamist movements set Scholasticism on a different path from that of Albert the Great and Aquinas, and the theological motivation of their philosophical arguments can be traced back to 1277. They stressed the traditional Franciscan themes of Divine Omnipotence and Divine Freedom, which formed part of Ockham's first thesis.

Ockham's second thesis was the principle of parsimony: also known as Ockham's razor. This developed a new form of logic, based on an empiricist theory of knowledge. "While Scholastic in setting," as David Lindberg writes, it was "thoroughly modern in orientation. Referred to as the via moderna, in opposition to the via antiqua of the earlier scholastics, it has been seen as a forerunner of a modern age of analysis." Other, even more skeptical thinkers in the mid-14th century included John of Mirecourt and Nicholas of Autrecourt. It has been suggested that the new philosophy of nature that emerged from the rise of Skepticism following the Condemnations, contained "the seeds from which modern science could arise in the early seventeenth century."

== See also ==
- History of Science in the Middle Ages
- Medieval university
- Renaissance of the 12th century
