= Abraham Solomon ben Isaac ben Samuel Catalan =

Abraham Solomon ben Isaac ben Samuel Catalan (born in Catalonia; died 1492) was the author of a work treating the eternity of the world, providence, prophecy, immortality, and the resurrection, and also dealing with mathematical, physical, and cabalistic subjects. It appeared under the title Neweh Shalom (Dwelling of Peace), Constantinople, 1538; Venice, 1574, with a preface by Moses Almosnino, who cites it several times in his work, Me'ammetz Koach.

Catalan also translated into Hebrew Albertus Magnus's Philosophia Pauperum, under the title Kitztzur ha-Philosophia ha-Chib'it (Synopsis of Natural Philosophy), and Marsilius of Inghen's Questions, under the title Sha'alot u-Teshubot (Questions and Answers). Both are still extant in manuscript; Catalan's preface to the latter work was published by Adolf Jellinek, without mention of the translator, together with the index of the questions, under the title Marsilius ab Inghen (Leipzig, 1859).

== Bibliography ==
- Rossi, Giovanni Battista de, Historisches Wörterbuch der Jüdischen Schriftsteller und Ihrer Werke, p. 69
- Steinschneider, Moritz, Hebräische Übersetzungen, pp. 465, 469
