= Aeterni Patris =

1879 papal encyclical by Pope Leo XIII

Aeterni Patris Latin for 'Of the Eternal Father' Encyclical of Pope Leo XIII
- Signature date: 4 August 1879
- Subject: On the restoration of Christian Philosophy
- Number: 3 of 85 of the pontificate
- Text: In Latin; In English

Aeterni Patris (English: Of the Eternal Father) was an encyclical issued by Pope Leo XIII in August 1879. It was subtitled "On the Restoration of Christian Philosophy in Catholic Schools in the Spirit (ad mentem) of the Angelic Doctor, St. Thomas Aquinas". The aim of the encyclical was to advance the revival of Scholastic philosophy.

== Introduction ==
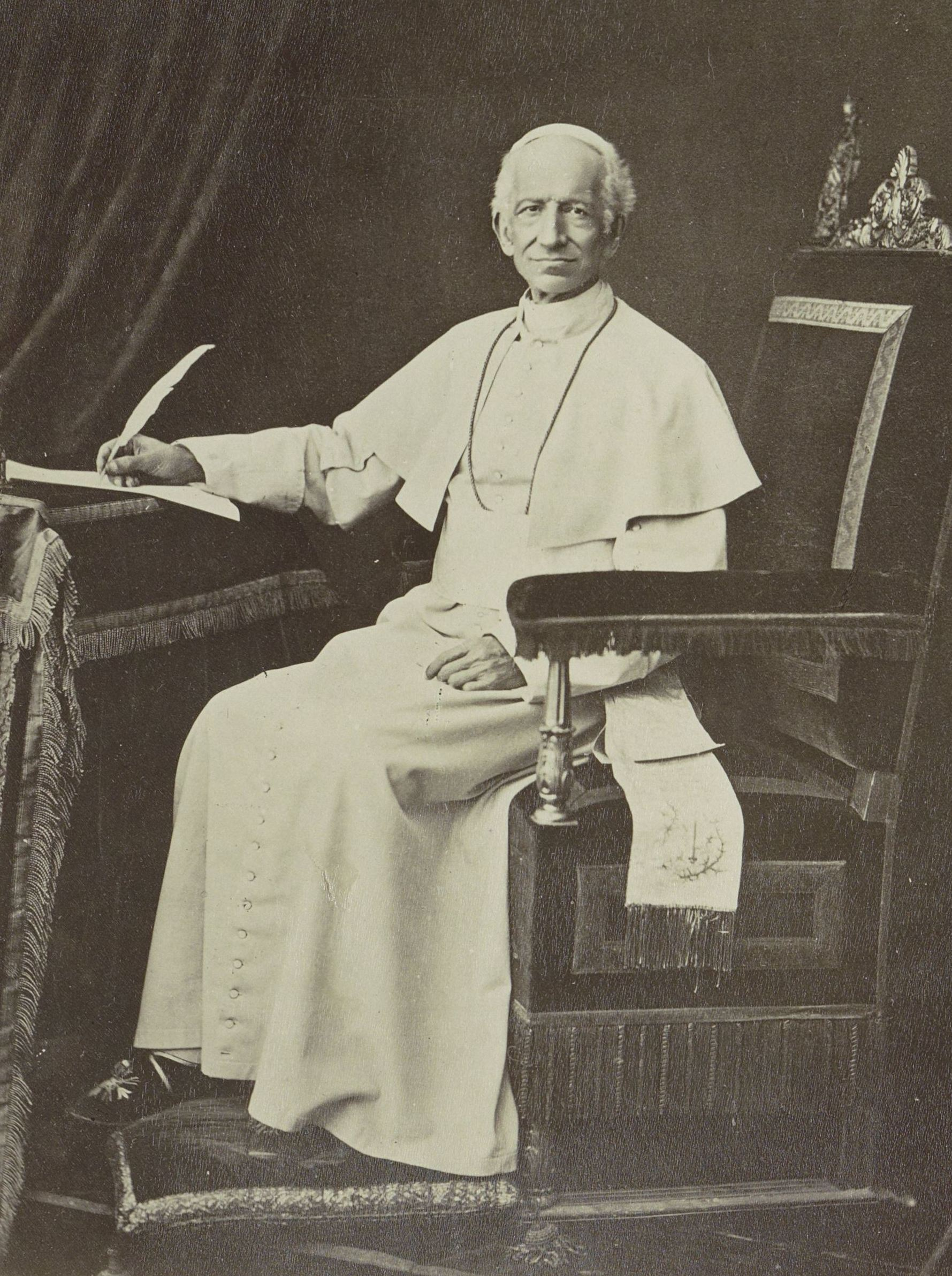
Pope Leo XIII in 1878

In August 1879, eighteen months into his pontificate, Pope Leo XIII (formerly Joachim Cardinal Pecci, bishop of Perugia), issued the encyclical letter Aeterni Patris. The aim of the encyclical was to aid and advance the restoration of Christian philosophy, which he felt had fallen into danger and disrepute by adhering to modern trends in secular philosophy, by urging a return to the scholastic thinkers of the Middle Ages, most especially the Angelic Doctor St. Thomas Aquinas, and the related philosophical system of Thomism. The encyclical attempts to clarify the roles of faith and philosophy, later to be covered again in John Paul II's encyclical, Fides et Ratio (On Faith and Reason), showing how most beneficially each may profit from the other.

The purpose of Leo XIII was the revival of St. Thomas's philosophy and the continuing of his spirit of investigation, but not necessarily the adoption of every argument and opinion to be found in the works of the scholastics. According to the encyclical, the philosophy most conformable and useful for the faith is that of St. Thomas. The vigorous reintroduction of St. Thomas into the Catholic philosophical teaching was perceived by many as a bold and unprecedented step by the new pope. Indeed, since the French Revolution, most pontiffs had preferred to condemn the errors in contemporary philosophy, not to recommend explicitly a return to the old. The encyclical, however, was no surprise to any acquainted with Cardinal Pecci, who had for years been spearheading a Thomistic renaissance in the schools in his diocese of Perugia, leading to such theologians and philosophers as Reginald Garrigou-Lagrange, Etienne Gilson, and Jacques Maritain.

The content of the encyclical was strongly influenced by Tommaso Maria Zigliara professor from 1870 to 1879 at the College of Saint Thomas, the future Pontifical University of Saint Thomas Aquinas, Angelicum. "Zigliara also helped prepare the great encyclicals Aeterni Patris and Rerum novarum and strongly opposed traditionalism and ontologism in favor of the moderate realism of Aquinas."

Zigliara, a member of seven Roman congregations including the Congregation for Studies, was a co-founder of the Academia Romano di San Tommaso in 1870. Zigliara's fame as a scholar at the forefront of the Thomist revival at the time of his rectorship of the College of St. Thomas after 1873 was widespread in Rome and elsewhere. Following the publication of this encyclical Pope Leo XIII created the Pontifical Academy of St. Thomas Aquinas on October 15, 1879, and ordered the publication of the critical edition, the so-called "leonine edition", of the complete works of Aquinas, the doctor angelicus. The superintendence of the leonine edition was entrusted to Zigliara.

== An overview of the document’s main points ==
Introduction 1. The opening paragraph begins with a reference to Christ’s command to His Apostles to set all men free by teaching the truth of the faith to all nations (Matthew 28:19). Although philosophy can and has deceived men about important matters, it is also capable of illuminating the other sciences. This, then, is the aim of Aeterni Patris: to promote the kind of philosophy that “shall respond most fitly to the excellence of faith, and at the same time [is] consonant with the dignity of human science.”

2. The errors of philosophy have caused problems in public and private life. Philosophy alone is insufficient to emerge from error or prevent further erroneous conclusions “concerning divine or human things.” The faith of the Christian religion preserves philosophic truth by bringing to men “the grace of the divine wisdom.” Neither reason nor philosophy is destroyed by faith; God, creator of “the light of reason in the human mind,” strengthens man and his reason by faith.

3. Pointing to the Church Fathers, the encyclical shows how reason and science were used to call people to faith.

The Relationship between Philosophy and Faith: How Philosophy Aids Faith

4. In the fourth paragraph, the encyclical begins to articulate the ways in which philosophy can aid and complement true faith. Reason is characterized as a “steppingstone” to Christian faith, in that philosophy, when used rightly, fortifies the road to faith and prepares the soul for fit reception of revelation. Reason is characterized as rather autonomous, in that the pagans demonstrated and proved conclusions, using only their natural reason, which supported certain truths regarding faith: the existence of God, his power and divinity, as well as the existence of a natural law. A comparison is drawn between the way in which the Hebrews took with them Egyptian treasures to offer to the service of God, and the way in which truths discovered by the philosophy of the pagans are to be turned to the use and purposes of revealed doctrine.

5. The great and noble fruits gathered from natural reason, as described in the fifth paragraph, include its ability to recognize “that the doctrine of the Gospel has even from its very beginning been made manifest by certain wonderful signs.” The spread, sanctity, and unity of the Church is another sign that reason can recognize.

6. The sixth paragraph draws attention to the fact that sacred theology requires philosophy in order to be a genuine science: in order to assume the nature, form, and genius of a true science, theology requires the solid foundation of philosophy. Moreover, Philosophy complements theology in that true understanding and knowledge are better and more easily attained by those who join philosophic studies with the love of faith and integrity of life.

7. Philosophy is characterized as both a defensive and offensive tool of faith. Defensively it protects the revealed truth from distortion; offensively it weakens arguments contrary to revealed truth. The examples of the Apostle Paul’s use of Greek philosophy in Athens (17:16–34) and David’s use of Goliath’s sword (Samuel 17:50–54) are given as literal and metaphorical examples of using philosophy in a defensive and offensive manner. The Church “commands” Christian teachers to enlist the help of philosophy in instructing the faithful but cautions against philosophical arguments that are contrary to revealed truth.

The Relationship between Philosophy and Faith: How Faith Aids Philosophy

8. Philosophy and revelation represent two realms of knowledge. Philosophy represents the profane realm of natural truth whereas revelation represents the divine realm of supernatural truth. Revelation or supernatural truth is beyond the reach of reason and therefore philosophy must accept these truths by faith. Philosophy is characterized as a handmaid to faith that humbly accepts revelation. Revelation has the “force of certain truth” so that what is contrary to faith is also contrary to reason. Thus, the philosopher is discouraged from accepting any conclusion that is opposed to revealed doctrine.

9. The human mind is limited and needs the truth of revelation to avoid error. Without the supernatural truth of revelation the human mind is subject to error and opinion. The fact that revelation assists the philosopher in reasoning correctly does not detract from the dignity of the human intellect because wisdom is gained in recognizing the limits of reason. “Faith frees and saves reason from error, and endows it with manifold knowledge.” Revelation serves as a lamp for the philosopher’s path toward truth.

The Relationship between Philosophy and Faith in Historical Perspective

10. The history of philosophy is marked by those who lacked “the gift of faith”—an error that led to doubtful claims about the nature of reality but especially divinity. However, Christ, “as the power and wisdom of God,” restores knowledge through his followers, and by their efforts redeems what is true in pagan philosophy. In doing so, Catholic doctrine was developed and defended against heretics and other adversaries who sought to propose contrary views.

11. In combating these adversaries, Catholic apologists even from the early centuries (for example, Justin Martyr) encountered both the power of reason to demonstrate certain attributes of God and the limitation of reason in relationship to revelation.

12. The encyclical continues the list of those early Christian thinkers who have labored to defend the faith from error and develop a philosophically informed account of it: Quadratus, Aristides, Hermias, Athenagoras, Irenaeus of Lyons, Clement of Alexandria, Origen, Tertullian, amongst others, are listed.

13. In paragraph 13, Pope Leo XIII continues his list of those who have advanced the Christian intellectual tradition. He turns his attention first to St. Augustine, who Leo says “[w]ould seem to have wrested the palm from all.” The genius of Augustine was his ability to combat “most vigorously all the errors of his age,” as well as his ability to lay down the “safe foundations and sure structure of human science.” The paragraph ends with mention of John Damascene, Basil, and Gregory of Nazianzen as carrying the tradition in the East, and Boethius and Anselm in the West, all of whom Pope Leo says “[a]dded largely to the patrimony of philosophy.”

14. Paragraph 14 speaks of the “doctors of the middle ages,” the “Scholastics,” whose contribution to the tradition was their “diligently collecting, and sifting, and storing up, as it were, in one place, for the use and convenience of posterity the rich and fertile harvests of Christian learning scattered abroad in the voluminous works of the holy Fathers.” Pope Leo XIII quotes Pope Sixtus V, who names in particular the “angelic St. Thomas and the seraphic St. Bonaventure” as preeminent doctors whose “surpassing genius” and “unwearied diligence” aided in further advancing the tradition.

15. The quotation from Sixtus V continues through paragraph 15, and it is here that scholasticism, drawing together and compiling the sacred writings, the work of the “sovereign Pontiffs, the holy Fathers and the councils,” is portrayed as beneficial to the posterity in three ways: for (1) understanding and interpreting Scripture, (2) understanding the Fathers, and (3) combating heresies and errors. The last way is highlighted in the paragraph for the particular importance it plays in “confirming the dogmas of Catholic faith and confuting heresies.”

16. In paragraph 16, the praise of scholastic theology is extended to the philosophy upon which it is based.

17. The following paragraph names Thomas Aquinas as the preeminent example of scholasticism. He is praised for collecting together all the other arguments of scholastics, and then made valuable additions as well. Apart from his contributions to theology, Thomas, the encyclical claims, also touched finely upon all points of philosophy.

18. In paragraph 18, Thomas is said to have triumphed over previous errors, and supplied those who follow him with the means to defeat other errors that would arise. Thomas also distinguished, “as is fitting,” faith from reason, without infringing upon the legitimate rights of either of them and instead strengthening each through the aid of the other.

The Authority of St. Thomas Aquinas

19. The nineteenth paragraph begins a discussion of the many ways in which Aquinas’s authority has been recognized through the centuries. The encyclical describes how many religious orders mandated the study of his works to their members: the Dominicans, of course, but also the Benedictines, Carmelites, Augustinians, and Jesuits. This was done because St. Thomas reached such sound and defensible conclusions.

20. The twentieth paragraph of the encyclical refers to all the great universities of the scholastic period where Thomistic theology enjoyed prominence, creating harmony among all the schools adhering to his teaching.

21. The twenty-first paragraph of the encyclical continues the list of testimonials to St. Thomas’s greatness by mentioning some of the popes who have honored, borrowed from, and praised the work of St. Thomas.

22. Thomas Aquinas has long been held “in singular honor” in the ecumenical councils, including those of Lyons, Vienne, Florence, and the Vatican. This high regard was most especially evident during the Council of Trent, in which his Summa was laid “upon the altar, together with sacred Scripture and the decrees of the supreme Pontiffs.”

23. Aquinas has been equally esteemed even among critics of the Church, “who openly declared that, if the teaching of Thomas Aquinas were only taken away, they could easily battle with all Catholic teachers.”

24. The “struggling innovators of the sixteenth century” philosophized without regard for faith. Their inventions were in accordance with their own whims, and so, naturally, there arose a great diversity of philosophies, “differing and clashing” even in those matters of human knowledge that are most important. Pope Leo fears that many philosophers were forsaking the solid philosophical foundation of antiquity and turning toward “a foundation open to change.” And another danger: while Leo affirms the important work of scholarship, he cautions that philosophical pursuits should not be characterized by “mere erudition”; what is required, rather, is an authentic development of learning.

The Need for a Thomistic and Scholastic Renaissance

25. Paragraph 25, which acknowledges that, in the face of these dangers, some already have already returned to the superior philosophy of St. Thomas Aquinas, is followed by the hortatory and encouraging remarks in paragraph 26.

26. Both paragraphs use ornamental language in speaking of the “beauty” of the “pure streams” from the “precious fountainhead of the Angelic Doctor.” The language may appeal implicitly to a Thomistic understanding of Beauty as a transcendental quality inseparable from the Good and the Truth.

27. The encyclical goes on in paragraph 27 to urge the teaching of scholastic philosophy and theology, especially to the young seminarians “who are the growing hope of the Church.” Scholastic thought is likened to a strong weapon with which one may best defend the Catholic faith against the assault waged against her by the “machinations and craft of a certain false wisdom.” Scholastic philosophy is presented as second only to the “supernatural help of God,” in its ability to defend the faith.

28. The restoring of the teachings of Thomas Aquinas in the universities and the strong foundation this will offer the students will also help society as a whole by offering it a “more peaceful and secure existence,” as well as protecting it from the “plague of perverse opinions.”

29. Scholastic philosophy, with its “sound judgment,” “right method,” and “spirit,” will strengthen and guide all the different disciplines, including the liberal arts and the physical sciences.

30. In particular, scholastic philosophy does not oppose the “advance and development of natural science.” On the contrary, philosophy is in accord with the conclusions of modern physics. This accord is exemplified by the openness of Aquinas and Albertus Magnus, among other scholastics, to giving “large attention to the knowledge of natural things.”

31. This paragraph emphasizes that the revival of scholasticism and, in particular, Thomism for which the encyclical calls is not a recommendation to practice a slavish adherence to outdated doctrines and ideas: “if there is anything that ill agrees with the discoveries of a later age … it does not enter Our mind to propose that for imitation in Our age.” It is crucial, as well, that Aquinas’s own writings be read and studied, rather than derivative works that may already be affected by errors.

Conclusion

32.–34. The document ends with an invocation of God’s grace and the blessing of the saints, for the important work that is recommended in the encyclical.

== Effects of the encyclical ==
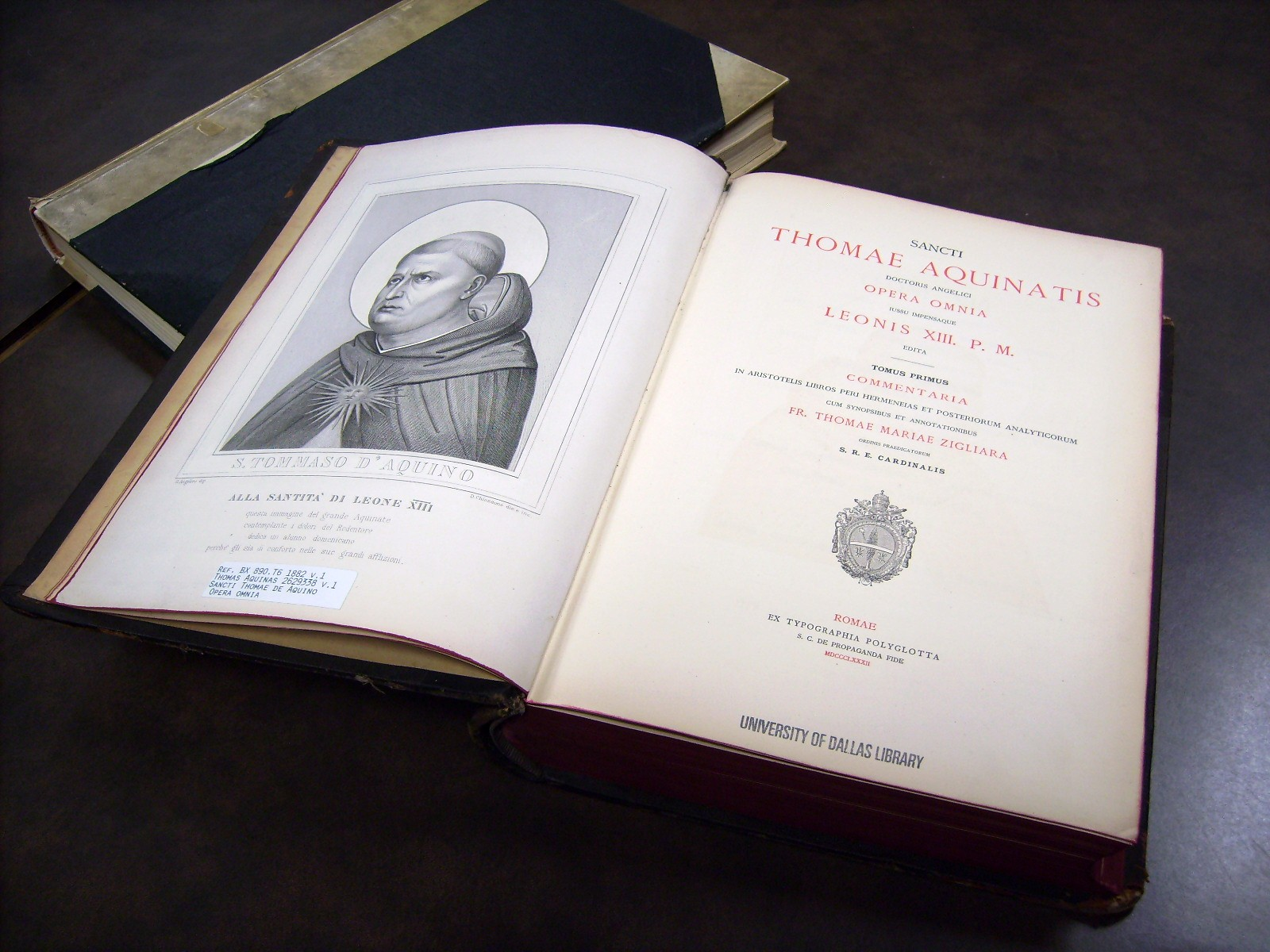
Volume 1 of the Leonine edition of the works of St. Thomas Aquinas (1882)

The interpretations and effects of the encyclical have been varied, some using it to authorize a return to a strict adherence to St. Thomas, others believing the document urges more a return to the spirit of Thomistic thinking. However various the effects may have been, the document has at least succeeded in reestablishing since its promulgation St. Thomas as a central figure in Catholic philosophy.

The chief aim of Aeterni Patris was the reintroduction of Thomism into Catholic educational centers for the purpose of bringing faith and reason back into a fruitful dialectic. Pope Leo XIII had recognized the detrimental effects to both society and religion when reason is privileged over faith. In an effort to promote Thomistic scholarship, Pope Leo XIII commissioned a critical edition of Aquinas’s works, referred to as the “Leonine” edition. Although Thomism had already enjoyed a half-century revival before 1879 through the writings of scholars such as Carlo Maria Curci (d. 1891), Giovanni Maria Cornoldi (d. 1892), and Tommaso Zigliara (d. 1893), Aeterni Patris heralded a renaissance of Thomism that still reverberates in modern theological and philosophical discourse.

Jesuit theologians such as Joseph Maréchal (1878–1944), Karl Rahner (1904–1984), and Bernard J. F. Lonergan (1904–1984) developed a post-Kantian Thomism sometimes called “Transcendental Thomism.” The French theologians Charles Journet (1891–1975), Jacques Maritain (1882–1973), and Étienne Gilson (1884–1978) contributed significantly to Thomistic methodology. Journet along with Maritain founded the journal Nova et Vetera and contributed to sessions at Vatican II. Gilson founded the Pontifical Institute of Mediaeval Studies in Toronto, Ontario. Gilson’s Being and Some Philosophers (1949) and Maritain’s The Degrees of Knowledge (1932) are still widely popular among students of Thomism. Together, Gilson and Maritain are sometimes called "existential Thomists."

French Dominicans Pierre Mandonnet (1858–1936), Marie-Dominique Chenu (1895–1990), and Yves Congar (1904–1995) explored the historical background of Thomas Aquinas and its relationship to theology. One of the best known French Dominicans of the twentieth century was Réginald Garrigou-Lagrange (1877–1964), who influenced generations of students during his tenure at the Pontifical University of St. Thomas Aquinas (Angelicum) in Rome. These developments and contributions can be seen as a natural consequence of the aim of Aeterni Patris to bring faith and reason together in a fruitful dialectic. The spirit and thought of Saint Thomas Aquinas advocated by the encyclical has proven a valuable resource for Catholic philosophy and theology in bringing both faith and reason to bear on the problems of modern life.

In Three Rival Versions of Moral Inquiry (1990) Alasdair MacIntyre examines three major rival traditions of moral inquiry: encyclopaedic, genealogical and traditional. Each was given defense from a canonical piece published in the late 19th century (the 9th Edition of the Encyclopædia Britannica, Nietzsche's Genealogy of Morals and Pope Leo XIII's Aeterni Patris). MacIntyre ultimately conducts a complex series of both interior and exterior critiques of the encyclopaedic and genealogical positions in an attempt to vindicate philosophical Thomism as the most persuasive form of moral inquiry.

== See also ==
- List of encyclicals of Pope Leo XIII

== Bibliography ==
- Brezik, Victor B. One Hundred Years of Thomism: Aeterni Patris and Afterwards. A Symposium (Houston: Center for Thomistic Studies, 1981)
- Bruni, Gerardo & Zybura, John S. Progressive Scholasticism. A Contribution to the Commemoration of the Fiftieth Anniversary of the Encyclical “Aeterni Patris” (St. Louis: B. Herder Book Co., 1929)
- Ehrle, Franz. Zur Enzyklika "Aeterni Patris." Text und Kommentar, ed. Franz Pelster, S.J. (Rome: Edizioni di Storia e Letteratura, 1954)
- Gargan, Edward T. Leo XIII and the Modern World (Whitefish, Mt.: Kessinger Publishing, 2006)
- Hill, Harvey. “Leo XIII, Loisy, and the 'Broad School': An Early Round of the Modernist Crisis,” The Catholic Historical Review 89:1 (2003): 39-59
- Knasas, John F. X. “Whither the Neo-Thomist Revival?” Logos: A Journal of Catholic Thought and Culture 3:4 (2000): 121–49
- McCool, Gerald A., S.J. From Unity to Pluralism: The Internal Evolution of Thomism (New York: Fordham University Press, 1989)
- Pereira, Jose. “Thomism and the Magisterium: From Aeterni Patris to Veritatis Splendor,” Logos: A Journal of Catholic Thought and Culture 5:3 (2002): 147–83
