= Johann Baptist Metz =

German Catholic priest and theologian (1928–2019)

The Reverend Johann Baptist Metz
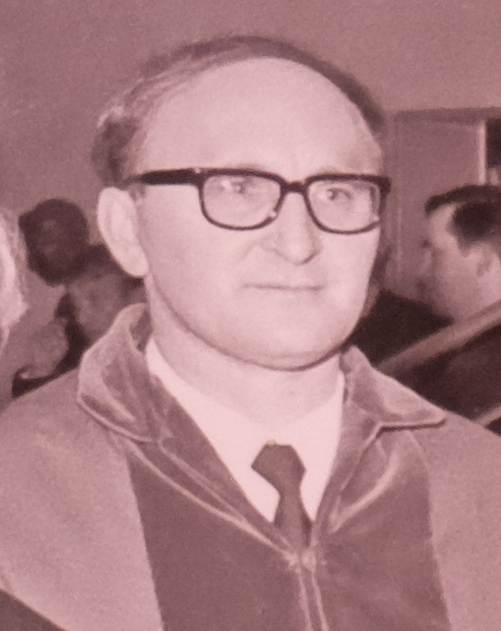
- Born: 5 August 1928; Auerbach in der Oberpfalz, Bavaria, Germany
- Died: 2 December 2019 (aged 91); Münster, North Rhine-Westphalia, Germany
- Occupations: Catholic priest; Theologian
- Organizations: University of Münster

Academic background
- Education: Bamberg University; University of Innsbruck; LMU Munich
- Doctoral advisor: Karl Rahner

Academic work
- Discipline: Theology
- Sub-discipline: Political theology; Holocaust theology; fundamental theology; eschatology
- Notable ideas: Dangerous memory; practical fundamental theology

Johann Baptist Metz (5 August 1928 – 2 December 2019) was a German Catholic priest and theologian. He was an ordinary professor of fundamental theology at the University of Münster and a consultant to the synod of German dioceses. He is regarded as one of the most important German theologians after the Second Vatican Council, and was an influence on the development of liberation theology.

== Life and career ==
Metz was born on 5 August 1928 in Auerbach in der Oberpfalz and grew up there. As a teenager, Metz was drafted into the German military in 1944, towards the end of the Second World War. Six months before the end of the war, he was captured by the Americans and sent to prisoner-of-war camps in Maryland and then Virginia. After the war, he moved back to Germany. He studied theology and philosophy from 1948, first at Bamberg University, then at the University of Innsbruck and at the LMU Munich. He completed his dissertation on the philosophy of Martin Heidegger in 1951. Metz was ordained a priest in 1954, and worked in ministry from 1958 to 1961. He was granted the Ph.D. for his dissertation on the theology of Thomas Aquinas; his supervisor was Karl Rahner. His experience in the war matches that of the German Calvinist theologian Jürgen Moltmann who would go on to write with Metz on political theology against a background of direct confrontation with Nazism. In 1962–63, he was granted a scholarship from the Deutsche Forschungsgemeinschaft.

He was professor of Fundamental Theology at the University of Münster from 1963 to 1993, where he developed a Theology after Auschwitz (Holocaust theology). He introduced philosophical and political ideas of 1968, by Ernst Bloch and the Frankfurt School of Max Horkheimer and Theodor W. Adorno, in theology, which was received with opposition. His concepts were applied by the liberation theology in Latin America. He participated in the founding of Bielefeld University and was a leading member of the international Paulus-Gesellschaft dedicated to a dialogue of Christianity and Marxism. After the Second Vatican Council, he was a consultant of the papal secretariat for the noncredentibus from 1968 to 1973. Metz was a consultant of the Würzburg Synod of the German dioceses from 1971 to 1975, and was the principal author of its document "Unsere Hoffnung" (Our hope) which became a key document for the reception of the Second Vatican Council in Germany.

Metz lived in Münster until his death on 2 December 2019.

== Theology ==
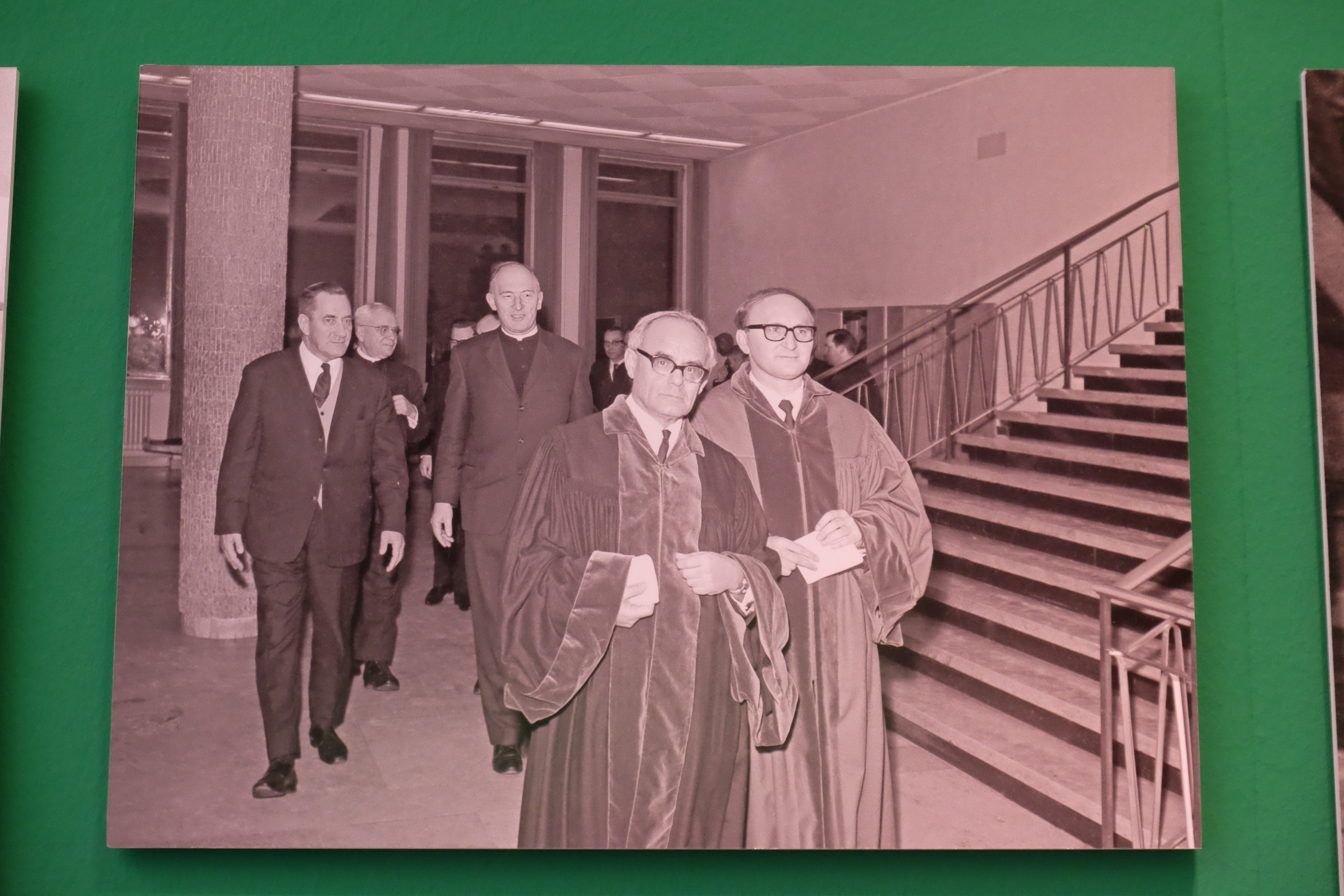
Metz and Rahner

A student of Karl Rahner, Metz sought to break with Rahner's transcendental theology in a turn to a theology rooted in praxis. However, in his critical study, Jaime Mercant Simó explains that there was no complete break in Metz's thought. According to Mercant, Rahner's transcendentalism and existentialism were the condition of possibility for the subsequent development of a theology of the world and a political theology. Metz was at the centre of a school of political theology that strongly influenced liberation theology. He is regarded as one of the most influential post–Vatican II German theologians. His thought turned around fundamental attention to the suffering of others. Key topics of his theology were memory, solidarity, and narrative. Works in English include: The Emergent Church, Faith in History and Society, Poverty of Spirit, and Hope Against Hope. Collected articles can be found in A Passion for God: The Mystical-Political Dimension of Christianity, translated by Matthew Ashley, and in John K. Downey, ed., Love's Strategy: The Political Theology of Johann Baptist Metz.

Fundamental to Metz's work is the concept of "dangerous memory", which relates to anamnesis in the Greek New Testament, a term which is central to the theology of the Eucharist. Metz spoke variously of "the dangerous memory of Jesus Christ", "the dangerous memory of freedom (in Jesus Christ)", the "dangerous memory of suffering", etc. One of the motivating factors for this category is Metz's determination, as a Christian theologian from Germany, to rework the whole of Christian theology from the ground up in light of the disruptive experience of the Holocaust. This need explains in part his break with Rahner, whose transcendental method appeals to historicity but does not come to terms with actual history. Metz was in dialogue with progressive Marxism, especially Walter Benjamin and the authors of the Frankfurt School. He levelled a fierce critique of what he called bourgeois Christianity and believed that the Christian Gospel had become less credible because it had become entangled with bourgeois religion. His work Faith in History and Society develops apologetics, or fundamental theology, from this perspective.

A key motif of his theology is compassion, as a sensitivity for the suffering of others, a compassion of God, and also a passion for God ("Leidempfindlichkeit für andere, die Mitleidenschaft Gottes, auch die Leidenschaft für Gott").

== Works ==
- Metz, Johann Baptist (1969). Theology of the World, trans. William Glen-Doepel. New York: Seabury. ISBN 9780816425686
- Metz, Johann Baptist (1980). Faith in History and Society: Toward a Practical Fundamental Theology. New York: Seabury. ISBN 9780816404261
- Metz, Johann Baptist (1997). A Passion for God: The Mystical-Political Dimension of Christianity. New York: Paulist Press. ISBN 978-0-8091-3755-8
- Metz, Johann Baptist (1998). Poverty in Spirit. New York: Paulist Press. ISBN 9780809137992
