= Étienne Tempier =

French theologian and bishop (died 1279)

- Bishop of Paris
- Church: Roman Catholic Church
- Diocese: Paris
- Appointed: 7 October 1268
- Term ended: 3 September 1279
- Predecessor: Renaud Mignon de Corbeil
- Successor: Renaud de Hombliéres
- Previous post: Canon of Notre Dame

Personal details
- Died: 3 September 1279

Étienne Tempier (French: [tɑ̃pje]; also known as Stephanus of Orleans; died 3 September 1279) was a French bishop of Paris during the 13th century. He was Chancellor of the Sorbonne from 1263 to 1268, and bishop of Paris from 1268 until his death. He is best remembered for promulgating a Condemnation of 219 philosophical and theological propositions (or articles) that addressed concepts that were being disputed in the faculty of arts at the University of Paris.

== Life ==
Born in Orléans, Tempier studied in Paris, where he became master of theology and canon of Notre Dame. During a period of about five years (1263–ca. 1268), Tempier was the Chancellor of the chapter of Notre Dame at Paris, succeeding Erich von Veire. At that time, the Chancellor of the Chapter was also the Chancellor of the University of Paris.

He served as bishop of Paris from 7 October 1268 until his death on 3 September 1279. Tempier had been a master in the faculty of theology.

== Condemnations ==
In 1270 Tempier, encouraged by Henry of Ghent (died 1293), had issued a formal condemnation of thirteen doctrines held by "radical Aristotelians". These included the unity of intellect, causal necessity, and the eternity of the world. Further investigation into perceived errors then prevalent at the university was prompted by the Portuguese cleric Juliani, who was elected Pope John XXI on 13 September 1276. A former professor of theology at the University of Paris, he wrote Tempier on 28 January 1277. The pope told Tempier that he had heard reports of heretical opinions in the Paris area, and requested to be informed of the situation. By this time Tempier was already investigating possible heretical opinions at the University of Paris.

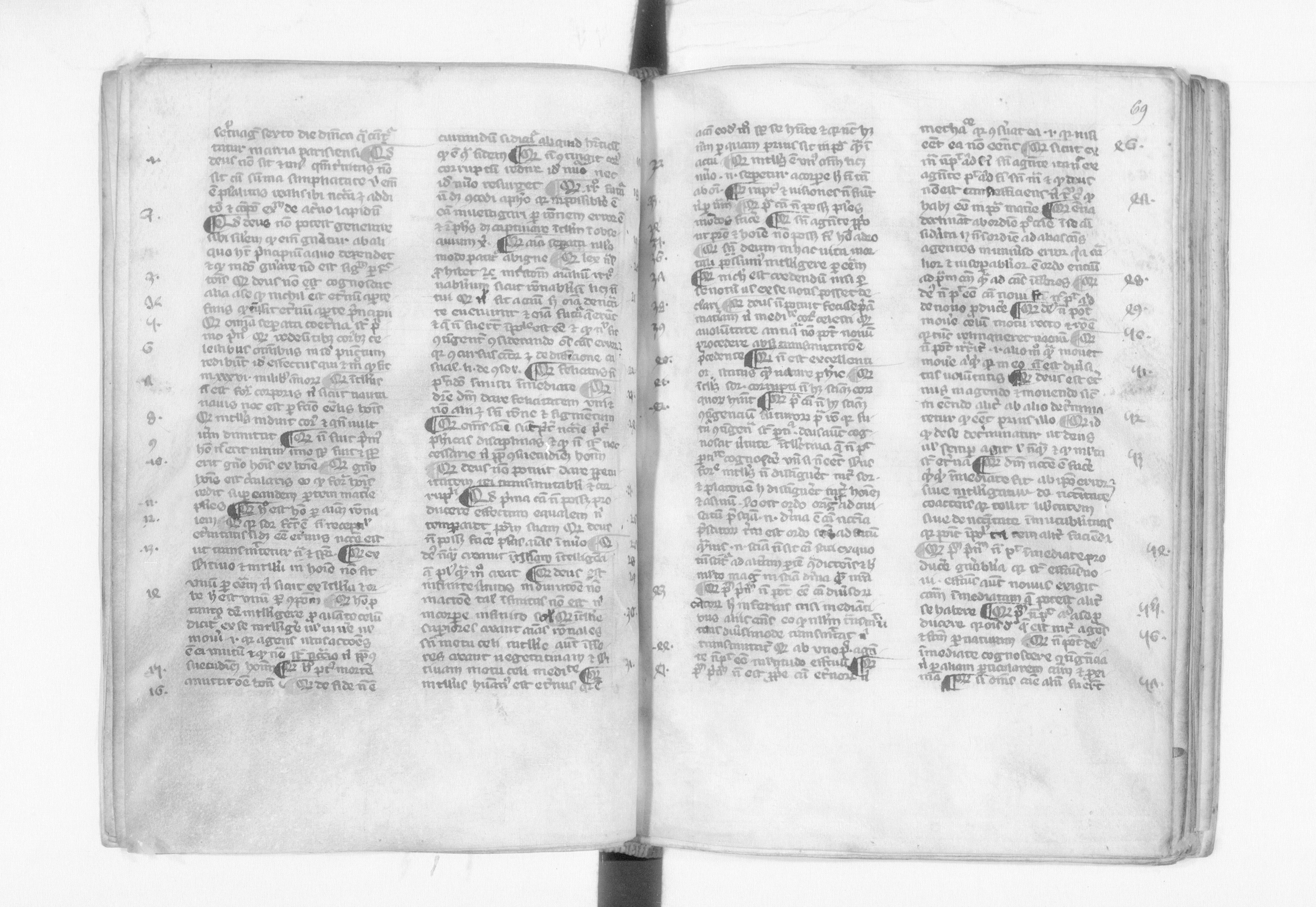
Articles of the condemnation of 1277 (Articuli damnati anno 1277)

On 7 March 1277, Tempier expanded the number of condemned doctrines to 219. He was assisted by a commission of theologians from the University. Henry of Ghent sat on Tempier's episcopal commission (assessores episcopi) of sixteen masters, which produced the syllabus of 219 propositions condemned by Tempier on 7 March 1277. The condemnations against Aristotelianism in Paris involved Giles of Rome, Siger of Brabant, the arts faculty, and certain doctrines of Thomas Aquinas. The forty-ninth item on the list was the assertion that God is incapable of moving the universe because it implies the existence of a void.

Tempier also overturned Aristotle on one point: God could have created more than one world (given His omnipotence) yet we know by revelation He made only one. Tempier's stress on God's omnipotence also opened up all kinds of possibilities for the understanding of the cosmos. In his effort to defend the abilities and unique rights of the Creator, Tempier's propositions led to the new approach taken to understand the workings of celestial and terrestrial bodies. By rejecting that astral bodies were animated, incorruptible and eternal, refuting the idea that their motion was the result of something comparable to animal desires and denying that stars had any influence over individuals, he showed that Christians were prepared to refute Aristotle's world view along with some basic assumptions held by Greek learning.

It is not clear what Tempier's intentions were in issuing this condemnation. Nevertheless, scholars have written that "the Parisian Condemnation of 1277 is symbolic of an intellectual crisis in the University. It is indicative of fundamental shifts in speculative thought and cultural perception which occurred in the late 13th century, which portend aspects of modern thought."

== Opposition to and repeal ==
Tempier's prohibitions did not curtail the free discussion of Thomist doctrines and did little to limit their influence at the University of Paris. His decree was actively opposed and eventually overturned in 1325.

== See also ==
- Averroism
- Godfrey of Fontaines
- Omnipotence paradox
- Vacuum

== Sources ==
- Bernd Goebel (2003). "Tempier, Étienne (Stephanus von Orléans)". In Bautz, Traugott (ed.). Biographisch-Bibliographisches Kirchenlexikon (BBKL) (in German). Vol. 22. Nordhausen: Bautz. cols. 1332–1339. ISBN 3-88309-133-2.
- Economist.com: "Millennium issue: The church and science" (in English)
- Philosophy Pages: Scholasticism's End (in English)
- Lettres d'Étienne Tempier, évêque de Paris, datées de 1277
- Hans Thijssen (2003) "Condemnation of 1277". The Stanford Encyclopedia of Philosophy (Fall 2008 Edition), Edward N. Zalta (ed.).
