= Pierre Mandonnet =

Belgian historian (1858–1936)

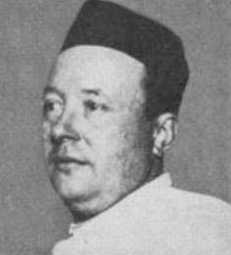
- Born: 26 February 1858; Beaumont, Puy-de-Dôme, France
- Died: 4 January 1936 (aged 77); Le Saulchoir, Belgium
- Occupation: Historian

Pierre Mandonnet (26 February 1858 – 4 January 1936) was a French-born, Belgian Dominican historian, important in the neo-Thomist trend of historiography and the recovery of medieval philosophy. He made his reputation with a study of Siger of Brabant.

== Biography ==
Pierre Mandonnet was born in Beaumont, Puy-de-Dômeon 26 February 1858.

In 1887 he was ordained as a priest, and from 1891 to 1919, was a professor of church history at the University of Fribourg. In 1902/03 he served as university rector.

He died in Le Saulchoir on 4 January 1936.

== Works ==
- Les Dominicains et la découverte de l'Amérique, (1893)
- Siger de Brabant et l'averroïsme latin au xiiie siècle (2 volumes, 1908–11)
- Des écrits authentiques de S. Thomas d'Aquin (Authentic Writings of St. Thomas Aquinas), Freibourg, (1910).
- Bibliographie thomiste (1921) with J. A. Destrez, later edition 1960.
- Dante le théologien; introduction à l'intelligence de la vie, des œuvres et de l'art de Dante Alighieri (1935).
- Saint Dominique: l'idée, l'homme et l'oeuvre (1921); translated into English in 1944 as St. Dominic and his work (2 parts).
