= Averroism =

School of medieval philosophy

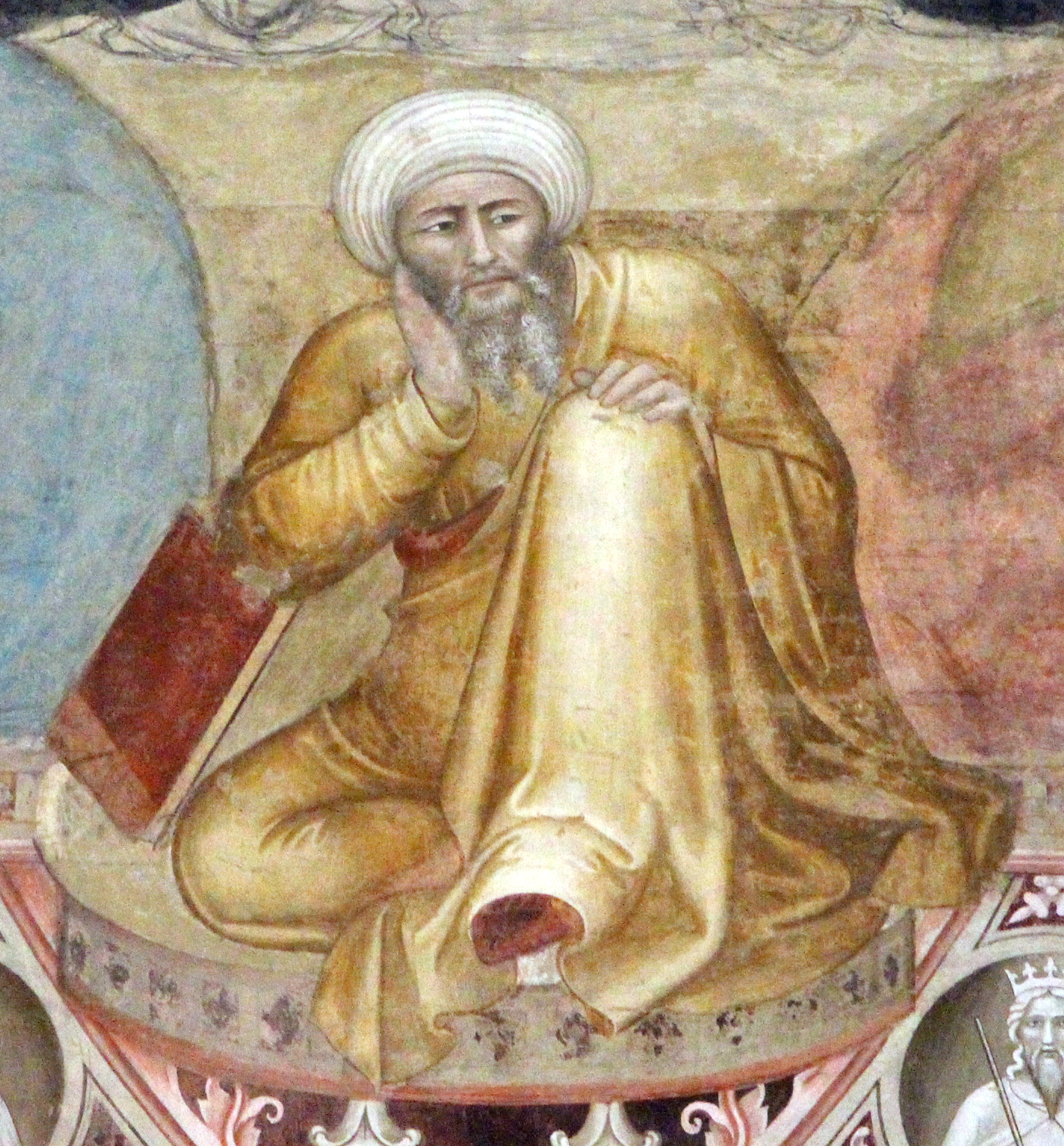
Averroes depicted in a painting by Italian artist Andrea di Bonaiuto. Florence, 14th century.

Averroism, also known as Rushdism, was a school of medieval philosophy based on the application of the works of 12th-century Andalusian philosopher Averroes, (Ibn Rushd in Arabic; 1126–1198) a commentator on Aristotle, in 13th-century Latin Christian scholasticism and Islamic Golden Age.

Latin translations of Averroes' work became widely available at the universities which were springing up in Western Europe in the 13th century, and were received by scholasticists such as Siger of Brabant and Boetius of Dacia, who examined Christian doctrines through reasoning and intellectual analysis.

The term Averroist was coined by Thomas Aquinas in the restricted sense of the Averroists' "unity of the intellect" doctrine in his book De unitate intellectus contra Averroistas. Based on this, Averroism came to be near-synonymous with atheism in late medieval usage.

As a historiographical category, Averroism was first defined by Ernest Renan in Averroès et l'averroïsme (1852) in the sense of radical or heterodox Aristotelianism.

The reception of Averroes in Jewish thought has been termed "Jewish Averroism". Jewish Averroist thought flourished in the later 14th century, and gradually declined in the course of the 15th century. The last representative of Jewish Averroism was Elia del Medigo, writing in 1485.

== Averroism and scholasticism ==
The teachings of Averroism resulted in the Condemnations of 1210–1277 by Bishop Etienne Tempier of the Catholic Church. Tempier specified 219 unacceptable theses, some of which were clearly directed against the supposed "Averroists" at the University of Paris. It has been pointed out that Tempier's main accusations were almost identical to those brought by al-Ghazali against philosophers in general in his The Incoherence of the Philosophers, which Averroës had tried to demonstrate to be unjustified in The Incoherence of the Incoherence.

In the preamble to the 1277 condemnations, Tempier accuses the philosophers of maintaining philosophical stances irreconcilable with Catholic dogmas while at the same time upholding their Catholic faith. Modern historians called this the "double truth" theory, the idea of the existence of two simultaneous yet contradictory truths: a factual or "hard" truth that is reached through science and philosophy, and a "religious" truth that is reached through religion. This idea differed from that of Averroes, who taught that there is only one truth, but reached in two different ways, not two truths. He did, however, believe that Scripture sometimes uses metaphorical language, but that those without the philosophical training to appreciate the true meaning of the passages in question were obliged to believe the literal meaning.

Modern scholarship has shown, however, that no Latin Christian medieval thinker ever upheld the "double truth" theory. Whether bishop Etienne Tempier accused them of doing so out of malice or ignorance remains unclear.

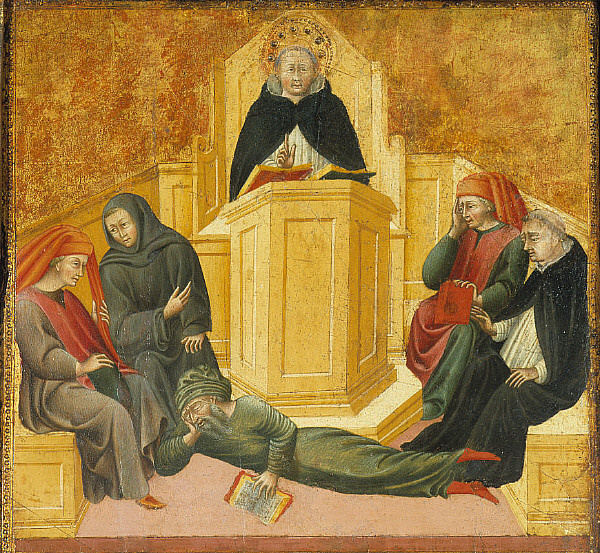
Giovanni di Paolo, "St. Thomas Aquinas Confounding Averroes".

The later philosophical concept of Averroism was the idea that the philosophical and religious worlds are separate entities. However, upon scrutinizing the 219 theses condemned by Tempier, it is obvious that not many of them originated in Averroes. Radical Aristotelianism and heterodox Aristotelianism were the terms commonly used for a while to refer to the actual philosophical movement started by Siger of Brabant and Boetius of Dacia and differentiate it from Averroism; today most scholars just call it Averroism as well.

Thomas Aquinas specifically attacked the "unity of the intellect" doctrine held by the Averroists in his book De unitate intellectus contra Averroistas.

Although condemned in 1277, many Averroistic theses survived to the sixteenth century, particularly in the University of Padua, and can be found in the philosophies of Giordano Bruno, Pico della Mirandola, and Cesare Cremonini. These theses talk about the superiority of philosophers to the common people and the relation between the intellect and human dignity.

== Jewish Averroism ==
In the centuries following Averroes' death there were many Jewish Averroist philosophers, notably Elijah Delmedigo; Gersonides wrote a supercommentary on Averroes' Aristotelian commentaries. Some Averroist influence has been traced in Leone Ebreo's Dialoghi d'Amore, and Baruch Spinoza was likely influenced by Averroes' commentaries on Aristotle.

== Reception of Averroes in Islam ==
There was no formal school or movement of Rushdiyya ("Averroism") in the Islamic tradition. The decline of Kalam or "Islamic scholastic theology" and Muʿtazila or "Islamic rationalism" has precluded a reception of Averroes in Islamic thought that would parallel that in Christian or Jewish philosophy. Nevertheless, a revival of rationalist traditions in medieval Islamic philosophy has been called for in modern Arab nationalism. Averroes became something of a symbolic figure in the debate over the decline and proposed revitalization of Islamic thought and Islamic society in the later 20th century. A notable proponent of such a revival of Averroist thought in Islamic society was Mohammed Abed al-Jabri with his Critique of Arab Reason (1982).

There is also an attempt to revive rationalist traditions by Jamal-Al Deen Al Afghani and his student Mohammad Abduh in Egypt.

== Bibliography ==
- Hasse, Dag Nikolaus (2014). "Influence of Arabic and Islamic Philosophy on the Latin West". In Edward N. Zalta (ed.). The Stanford Encyclopedia of Philosophy. Metaphysics Research Lab, Stanford University.
