= Siger of Brabant =

Belgian philosopher, c. 1240–1284

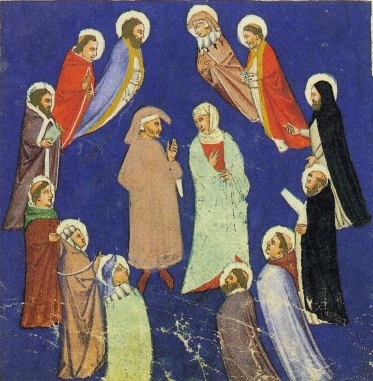
Dante and Beatrice in Paradise. Siger of Brabant is depicted with red cloak, top right (MS Thott 411.2, 15th century).

Siger of Brabant (Sigerus, Sighier, Sigieri or Sygerius de Brabantia; c. 1240 – before 10 November 1284) was a 13th-century philosopher from the southern Low Countries who was an important proponent of Averroism.

== Life ==
=== Early life ===
Little is known about many of the details of his life. In 1266, he was attached to the Faculty of Arts in the University of Paris at the time when a riot erupted between the French and Picard "nations" of students—a series of loosely organized fraternities. The papal legate threatened Siger with execution as the ringleader of the Picard attack on the French, but no further action was taken.

=== Works ===
In the ten years following the riot, he wrote the six works which are ascribed to him and were published under his name by Pierre Mandonnet in 1899. The titles of these treatises are:

- De anima intellectiva (1270)
- Quaestiones logicales
- Quaestiones naturales
- De aeternitate mundi
- Quaestio utrum haec sit vera: Homo est animal nullo homine existente
- Impossibilia

=== Rectorship ===
In 1271, he was once more involved in a party struggle. The minority among the "nations" chose him as rector in opposition to the elected candidate, Aubri de Rheims. For three years the strife continued, and was probably based on the opposition between the Averroists, Siger and Pierre Dubois, and the more orthodox schoolmen. The matter was settled by the Papal Legate, Simon de Brion, afterwards Pope Martin IV. Siger retired from Paris to Liège.

=== Time in Liège ===
Siger was accused of teaching "double truth"—that is, saying one thing could be true through reason, and that the opposite could be true through faith. Because Siger was a scholastic, he probably did not teach double truths but tried to find reconciliations between faith and reason.

In 1277, a general condemnation of Aristotelianism included a special clause directed against Boetius of Dacia and Siger of Brabant. Again Siger and Bernier de Nivelles were summoned to appear on a charge of heresy, especially in connection with the Impossibilia, where the existence of God is discussed. It appears, however, that Siger and Boetius fled to Italy and, according to John Peckham, archbishop of Canterbury, then perished miserably.

== Death ==
The manner of Siger's death, which occurred at Orvieto, is not known. A Brabantine chronicle says that he was stabbed by a seemingly-insane secretary (a clerico suo quasi dementi). The secretary is said to have used a pen as the murder weapon and Siger's critics claimed that, since he had done so much damage with his pen, he had deserved that kind of death. Dante, in the Paradiso (x.134–6), says that Siger found "death slow in coming", and some have concluded that this indicates death by suicide. A 13th-century sonnet by one Durante (xcii.9–14) says that Siger was executed at Orvieto: a ghiado il fe' morire a gran dolore, Nella corte di Roma ad Orbivieto. The date of this may have been 1283–1284, when Pope Martin IV was in residence at Orvieto. Siger's fellow radicals were lying low in the face of the Condemnations of 1277 and there was no investigation into his murder.

In politics Siger held that good laws were better than good rulers, and criticised papal infallibility in temporal affairs. The importance of Siger in philosophy lies in his acceptance of Averroism in its entirety, which drew upon him the opposition of Albertus Magnus and Aquinas.

In December 1270, Averroism was condemned by ecclesiastical authority, and during his whole life Siger was exposed to persecution both from the Church and from purely philosophic opponents.

== Cultural references ==
In Dante Alighieri's The Divine Comedy, Siger of Brabant is found in the Fourth Sphere of Paradise, together with Albertus Magnus and Thomas Aquinas, for being a positive example of Prudence, Justice, Temperance, and Fortitude (Paradiso, x.97-99, 133-8),

== See also ==
- Averroes
- University of Paris (Condemnations)

== Sources ==
- On the Eternity of the World, trans. Lottie H.Kendzierski (Marquette UP, 1964) [mainly translations from Thomas Aquinas, but the book includes selections from Siger of Brabant]
- Hissette, R. (1977) Enquête sur les 219 articles condamnés à Paris le 7 mars, 1277, Louvain: Publications Universitaires, Paris: Vander-Oyez.
- Mandonnet, P. (1908–11) Siger de Brabant et l’averroïsme latin au XIIIe siècle, Les Philosophes Belges VI–VII, Louvain: Institut supérieur de philosophie, 2 vols.
- Rubenstein, Richard E. Aristotle's Children: How Christians, Muslims, and Jews Rediscovered Ancient Wisdom and Illuminated the Middle Ages. New York: Harcourt, 2003.
- Van Steenberghen, F. (1977) Maître Siger de Brabant, Louvain: Publications universitaires, Paris: Vander-Oyez.
- Tony Dodd: The life and thought of Siger of Brabant, thirteenth-century Parisian philosopher: an examination of his views on the relationship of philosophy and theology. E. Mellen Press, Lewiston 1998, ISBN 0-7734-8477-9
- A. W. DeAnnuntis, Master Siger's Dream, What Books Press, Los Angeles 2010, ISBN 978-0-9823542-7-8
