= Thomism =

Philosophical system originating from Thomas Aquinas

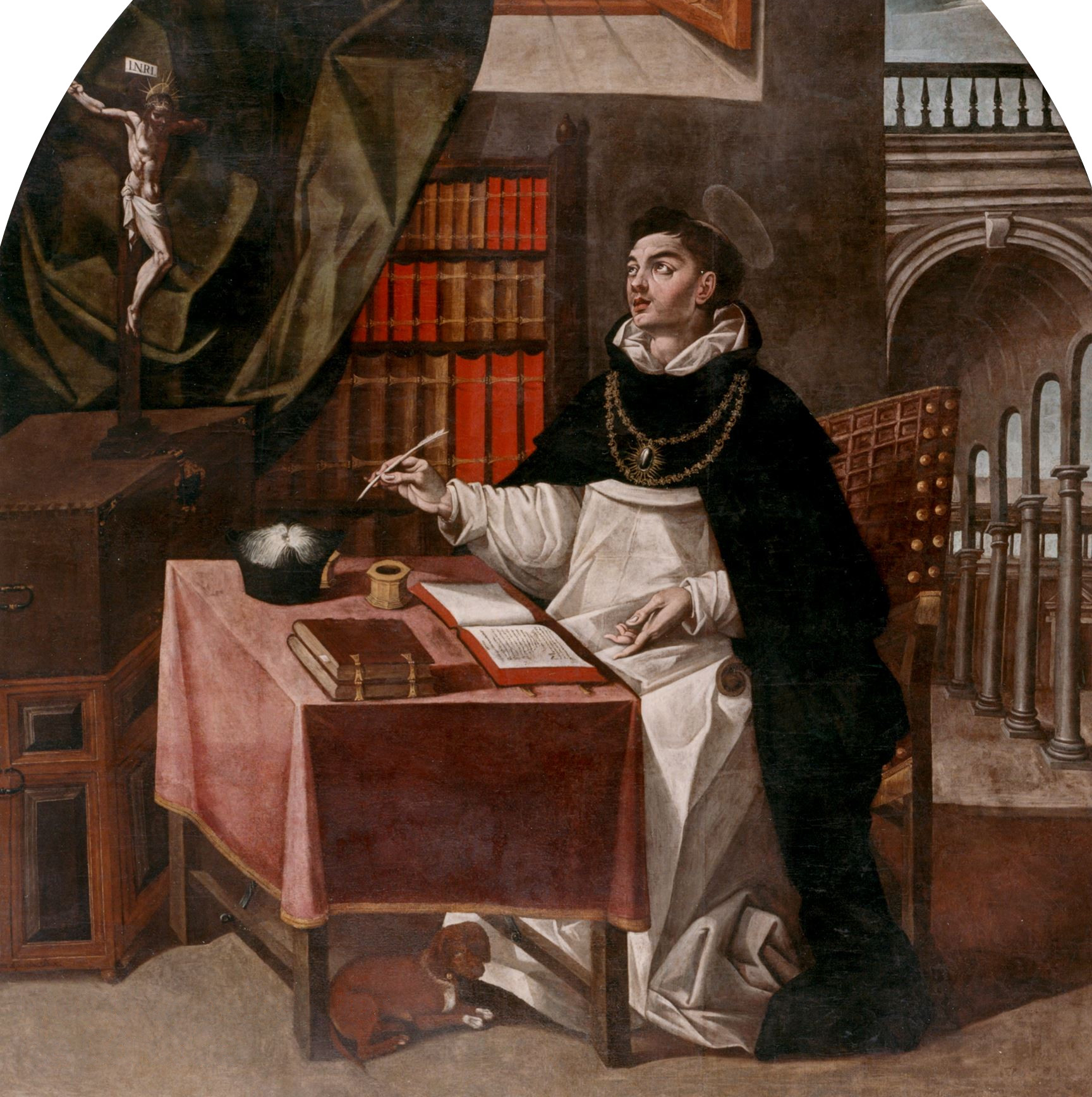
Painting of Saint Thomas Aquinas, after whom Thomism is named

Thomism is the philosophical and theological school which arose as a legacy of the work and thought of Thomas Aquinas (1225–1274), a Dominican philosopher, theologian, and Doctor of the Church.

In philosophy, Thomas's disputed questions and commentaries on Aristotle are perhaps his best-known works. In theology, his Summa Theologica is amongst the most influential documents in medieval theology and continues to be the central point of reference for the philosophy and theology of the Catholic Church. In the 1914 motu proprio Doctoris Angelici, Pope Pius X cautioned that the teachings of the Church cannot be understood without the basic philosophical underpinnings of Thomas's major theses:

The capital theses in the philosophy of St. Thomas are not to be placed in the category of opinions capable of being debated one way or another, but are to be considered as the foundations upon which the whole science of natural and divine things is based; if such principles are once removed or in any way impaired, it must necessarily follow that students of the sacred sciences will ultimately fail to perceive so much as the meaning of the words in which the dogmas of divine revelation are proposed by the magistracy of the Church.

== Overview ==
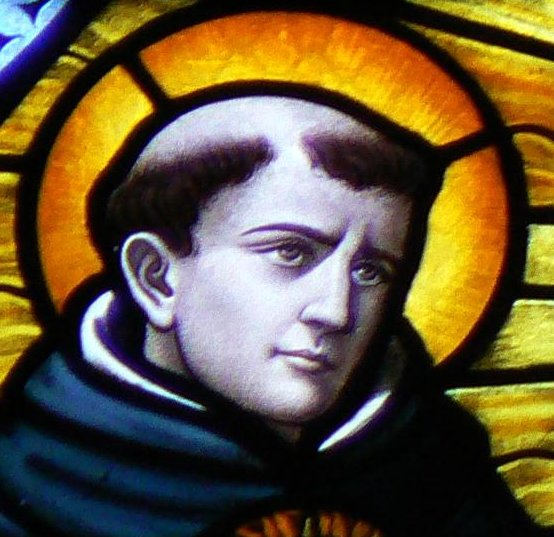
Thomas Aquinas (c. 1225–1274)

Thomas Aquinas held and practiced the principle that truth is to be accepted no matter where it is found. His doctrines drew from Greek, Roman, Islamic and Jewish philosophers. Specifically, he was a realist (i.e. unlike skeptics, he believed that the world can be known as it is). He often affirmed Aristotle's views with independent arguments, and largely followed Aristotelian terminology and metaphysics. He wrote comprehensive commentaries on Aristotle, and respectfully referred to him simply as "the Philosopher".

He also adhered to some neoplatonic principles, for example that "it is absolutely true that there is first something which is essentially being and essentially good, which we call God, [...] [and that] everything can be called good and a being, inasmuch as it participates in it by way of a certain assimilation".

== Metaphysics ==
Aquinas says that the fundamental axioms of ontology are the principle of non-contradiction and the principle of causality. Therefore, any being that does not contradict these two laws could theoretically exist, even if said being were incorporeal.

=== Predication ===
Aquinas noted three forms of descriptive language when predicating: univocal, analogical, and equivocal.

- Univocality is the use of a descriptor in the same sense when applied to two objects or groups of objects. For instance, when the word "milk" is applied both to milk produced by cows and by any other female mammal.
- Analogy occurs when a descriptor changes some but not all of its meaning. For example, the word "healthy" is analogical in that it applies both to a person or animal which enjoys good health and to some food or drink which promotes health.
- Equivocation is the complete change in meaning of the descriptor and is an informal fallacy, for example when the word "bank" is applied to river banks and financial banks. Modern philosophers call it ambiguity.

Further, the usage of "definition" that Aquinas gives is the genus of the being, plus a difference that sets it apart from the genus itself. For instance, the Aristotelian definition of "man" is "rational animal"; its genus being animal, and what sets apart man from other animals is his rationality.

=== Being ===
[E]xistence is twofold: one is essential existence or the substantial existence of a thing, for example man exists, and this is existence simpliciter. The other is accidental existence, for example man is white, and this is existence secundum quid.

— De Principiis Naturæ, C. 1

In Thomist philosophy, the definition of a being is "that which is", a principle with two parts: "that which" refers to its quiddity (literally "whatness"), and "is" refers to its esse (Latin "to be"). Quiddity means an essence, form, or nature which may or may not exist; whereas esse refers to existence or reality. That is, a being is "an essence that exists."

Being is divided in two ways: that which is in itself (substances), and that which is in another (accidents). Substances are things which exist per se or in their own right. Accidents are qualities that apply to other things, such as shape or color: "[A]ccidents must include in their definition a subject which is outside their genus." Because they only exist in other things, Aquinas holds that metaphysics is primarily the study of substances, as they are the primary mode of being.

The Catholic Encyclopedia pinpoints Aquinas' definition of quiddity as "that which is expressed by its definition." The quiddity or form of a thing is what makes the object what it is: "[T]hrough the form, which is the actuality of matter, matter becomes something actual and something individual", and also, "the form causes matter to be." Thus, it consists of two parts: "prime matter" (matter without form), and substantial form, which is what causes a substance to have its characteristics. For instance, an animal can be said to be a being whose matter is its body, and whose soul is its substantial form. Together, these constitute its quiddity/essence.

All real things have the transcendental properties of being: oneness, truth, goodness (that is, all things have a final cause and therefore a purpose), etc.

=== Causality ===
Aristotle categorized causality into four subsets in the Metaphysics, which is an integral part of Thomism:

"In one sense the term cause means (a) that from which, as something intrinsic, a thing comes to be, as the bronze of a statue and the silver of a goblet, and the genera of these. In another sense it means (b) the form and pattern of a thing, i.e., the intelligible expression of the quiddity and its genera (for example, the ratio of 2:1 and number in general are the cause of an octave chord) and the parts which are included in the intelligible expression. Again, (c) that from which the first beginning of change or of rest comes is a cause; for example, an adviser is a cause, and a father is the cause of a child, and in general a maker is a cause of the thing made, and a changer a cause of the thing changed. Further, a thing is a cause (d) inasmuch as it is an end, i.e., that for the sake of which something is done; for example, health is the cause of walking. For if we are asked why someone took a walk, we answer, "in order to be healthy"; and in saying this we think we have given the cause. And whatever occurs on the way to the end under the motion of something else is also a cause. For example, reducing, purging, drugs and instruments are causes of health; for all of these exist for the sake of the end, although they differ from each other inasmuch as some are instruments and others are processes."

— Metaphysics 1013a, trans. John P. Rowan, Chicago, 1961

- (a) refers to the material cause, what a being's matter consists of (if applicable).
- (b) refers to the formal cause, what a being's essence is.
- (c) refers to the efficient cause, what brings about the beginning of, or change to, a being.
- (d) refers to the final cause, what a being's purpose is.

Unlike many ancient Greeks, who thought that an infinite regress of causality is possible (and thus held that the universe is uncaused), Aquinas argues that an infinite chain never accomplishes its objective and is thus impossible. Hence, a first cause is necessary for the existence of anything to be possible. Further, the First Cause must continuously be in action (similar to how there must always be a first chain in a chain link), otherwise the series collapses:

The Philosopher says (Metaph. ii, 2) that "to suppose a thing to be indefinite is to deny that it is good." But the good is that which has the nature of an end. Therefore it is contrary to the nature of an end to proceed indefinitely. Therefore it is necessary to fix one last end.

— Summa, II-I, Q.1, art.4.

Thus, both Aristotle and Aquinas conclude that there must be an uncaused Primary Mover, because an infinite regress is impossible.

However, the First Cause does not necessarily have to be temporally the first. Thus, the question of whether or not the universe can be imagined as eternal was fiercely debated in the Middle Ages. The University of Paris's condemnation of 1270 denounced the belief that the world is eternal. Aquinas' intellectual rival, Bonaventure, held that the temporality of the universe is demonstrable by reason. Aquinas' position was that the temporality of the world is an article of faith, and not demonstrable by reason; one could reasonably conclude either that the universe is temporal or that it is eternal.

=== Goodness ===
As per the Nicomachean Ethics of Aristotle, Aquinas defines "the good" as what all things strive for. E.g., a cutting knife is said to be good if it is effective at its function, cutting. As all things have a function/final cause, all real things are good. Consequently, evil is nothing but privatio boni, or "lack of good", as Augustine of Hippo defined it.

Dionysius says (Div. Nom. iv), 'Evil is neither a being nor a good.' I answer that, one opposite is known through the other, as darkness is known through light. Hence also what evil is must be known from the nature of good. Now, we have said above that good is everything appetible; and thus, since every nature desires its own being and its own perfection, it must be said also that the being and the perfection of any nature is good. Hence it cannot be that evil signifies being, or any form or nature. Therefore it must be that by the name of evil is signified the absence of good. And this is what is meant by saying that 'evil is neither a being nor a good.' For since being, as such, is good, the absence of one implies the absence of the other.

— Summa, I, Q.48, art.1.

Commentating on the aforementioned, Aquinas says that "there is no problem from the fact that some men desire evil. For they desire evil only under the aspect of good, that is, insofar as they think it good. Hence their intention primarily aims at the good and only incidentally touches on the evil."

As God is the ultimate end of all things, God is by essence goodness itself. Furthermore, since love is "to wish the good of another", true love in Thomism is to lead another to God. Hence why John the Evangelist says, "Whoever is without love does not know God, for God is love."

=== Existence of God ===
Thomas Aquinas holds that the existence of God can be demonstrated by reason, a view that is taught by the Catholic Church. The quinque viae (Latin: five ways) found in the Summa Theologica (I, Q.2, art.3) are five possible ways of demonstrating the existence of God, which today are categorized as:

1. Argumentum ex motu, or the argument of the unmoved mover;
2. Argumentum ex ratione causae efficientis, or the argument of the first cause;
3. Argumentum ex contingentia, or the argument from contingency;
4. Argumentum ex gradu, or the argument from degree; and
5. Argumentum ex fine, or the teleological argument.

Despite this, Aquinas also thought that sacred mysteries such as the Trinity could only be obtained through revelation; though these truths cannot contradict reason:

The existence of God and other like truths about God, which can be known by natural reason, are not articles of faith, but are preambles to the articles; for faith presupposes natural knowledge, even as grace presupposes nature, and perfection supposes something that can be perfected. Nevertheless, there is nothing to prevent a man, who cannot grasp a proof, accepting, as a matter of faith, something which in itself is capable of being scientifically known and demonstrated.

— Summa, I, Q.2, art.2.

Aquinas responds to the problem of evil by saying that God allows evil to exist so that good may come of it (for goodness done out of free will is superior than goodness done from biological imperative), but does not personally cause evil Himself.

=== View of God ===
Aquinas articulated and defended, both as a philosopher and a theologian, the orthodox Christian view of God. God is the sole being whose existence is the same as His essence: "what subsists in God is His existence." (Hence why God names himself "I Am that I Am" in Exodus 3:14.) Consequently, God cannot be a body (that is, He cannot be composed of matter), He cannot have any accidents, and He must be simple (that is, not separated into parts; the Trinity is one substance in three persons). Further, He is goodness itself, perfect, infinite, omnipotent, omniscient, happiness itself, knowledge itself, love itself, omnipresent, immutable, and eternal. Summing up these properties, Aquinas offers the term actus purus (Latin: "pure actuality").

Aquinas held that not only does God have knowledge of everything, but that God has "the most perfect knowledge", and that it is also true to say that God "is" His understanding.

Aquinas also understands God as the transcendent cause of the universe, the "first Cause of all things, exceeding all things caused by Him", the source of all creaturely being and the cause of every other cause. Consequently, God's causality is not like the causality of any other causes (all other causes are "secondary causes"), because He is the transcendent source of all being, causing and sustaining every other existing thing at every instant. Consequently, God's causality is never in competition with the causality of creatures; rather, God even causes some things through the causality of creatures.

Aquinas was an advocate of the "analogical way", which says that because God is infinite, people can only speak of God by analogy, for some of the aspects of the divine nature are hidden (Deus absconditus) and others revealed (Deus revelatus) to finite human minds. Thomist philosophy holds that we can know about God through his creation (general revelation), but only in an analogous manner. For instance, we can speak of God's goodness only by understanding that goodness as applied to humans is similar to, but not identical with, the goodness of God. Further, he argues that sacred scripture employs figurative language: "Now it is natural to man to attain to intellectual truths through sensible objects, because all our knowledge originates from sense. Hence in Holy Writ, spiritual truths are fittingly taught under the likeness of material things."

In order to demonstrate God's creative power, Aquinas says: "If a being participates, to a certain degree, in an 'accident,' this accidental property must have been communicated to it by a cause which possesses it essentially. Thus iron becomes incandescent by the action of fire. Now, God is His own power which subsists by itself. The being which subsists by itself is necessarily one."

== Anthropology ==
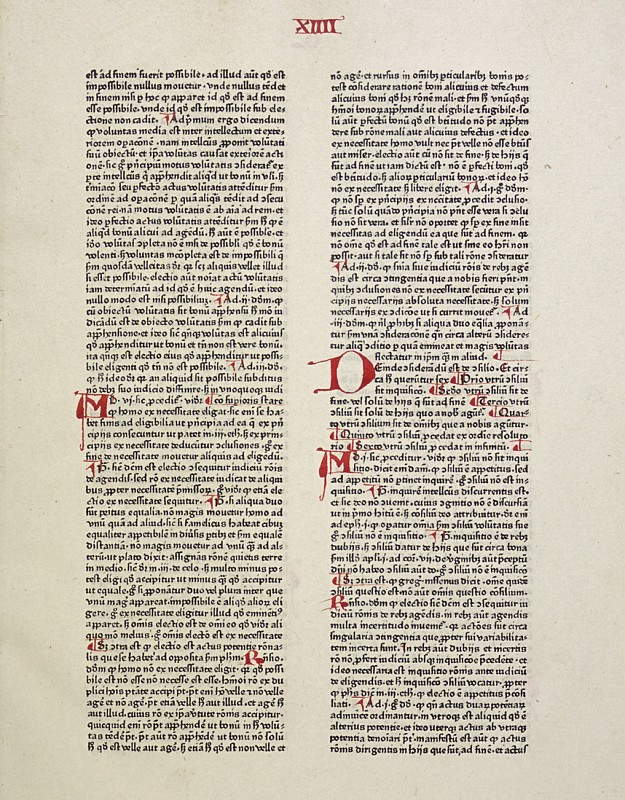
Summa Theologiæ, Pars secunda, prima pars. (copy by Peter Schöffer, 1471)

In addition to agreeing with the Aristotelian definition of man as "the rational animal", Aquinas also held various other beliefs about the substance of man. For instance, as the essence (nature) of all men are the same, and the definition of being is "an essence that exists", humans that are real therefore only differ by their specific qualities. More generally speaking, all beings of the same genus have the same essence, and so long as they exist, only differ by accidents and substantial form.

=== Soul ===
Thomists define the soul as the substantial form of living beings. Thus, plants have "vegetative souls", animals have "sensitive souls", while human beings alone have "intellectual" – rational and immortal – souls.

For Aristotle, the soul is one, but endowed with five groups of faculties (dunámeis): (1) the "vegetative" faculty (threptikón), concerned with the maintenance and development of organic life; (2) the appetite (oretikón), or the tendency to any good; (3) the faculty of sense perception (aisthetikón); (4) the "locomotive" faculty (kinetikón), which presides over the various bodily movements; and (5) reason (dianoetikón). The Scholastics generally follow Aristotle's classification. For them body and soul are united in one complete substance. The soul is the forma substantialis, the vital principle, the source of all activities. Hence their science of the soul deals with functions which nowadays belong to the provinces of biology and physiology. [...] The nature of the mind and its relations to the organism are questions that belong to philosophy or metaphysics.

— Dubray, C. (1909). Faculties of the Soul. In The Catholic Encyclopedia. New York: Robert Appleton Company. Retrieved May 29, 2010 from New Advent.

The appetite of man has two parts, rational and irrational. The rational part is called the will, and the irrational part is called passion.

=== Ethics ===
Aquinas affirms Aristotle's definition of happiness as "an operation according to perfect virtue", and that "happiness is called man's supreme good, because it is the attainment or enjoyment of the supreme good." Aquinas defines virtue as a good habit, which is a good quality of a person demonstrated by his actions and reactions over a substantial period of time. He writes:

As we have said above (Article 1), virtue implies a perfection of power: wherefore the virtue of a thing is fixed by the limit of its power (De Coelo i). Now the limit of any power must needs be good: for all evil implies defect; wherefore Dionysius says (Div. Hom. ii) that every evil is a weakness. And for this reason the virtue of a thing must be regarded in reference to good. Therefore human virtue which is an operative habit, is a good habit, productive of good works.

— Summa, I-II, Q.55, art.3.

Aquinas ascertained the cardinal virtues to be prudence, temperance, justice, and fortitude. The cardinal virtues are natural and revealed in nature, and they are binding on everyone. There are, however, three theological virtues: faith, hope, and charity (which is used interchangeably with love in the sense of agape). These are supernatural and are distinct from other virtues in their object, namely, God.

In accordance with Roman Catholic theology, Aquinas argues that humans can neither wish nor do good without divine grace. However, "doing good" here refers to doing good per se: man can do, moved by God even then but "only" in the sense in which even his nature depends on God's moving, things that happen to be good in some respect, and are not sinful, though if he has not grace, it will be without merit, and he will not succeed in it all the time. Therefore, happiness is attained through the perseverance of virtue given by the Grace of God, which is not fully attained on earth; only at the beatific vision. Notably, man cannot attain true happiness without God.

Regarding emotion (used synonymously with the word "passion" in this context), which, following John Damascene, Aquinas defines as "a movement of the sensitive appetite when we imagine good or evil", Thomism repudiates both the Epicurean view that happiness consists in pleasure (sensual experiences that invoke positive emotion), and the Stoic view that emotions are vices by nature. Aquinas takes a moderate view of emotion, quoting Augustine: "They are evil if our love is evil; good if our love is good." While most emotions are morally neutral, some are inherently virtuous (e.g. pity) and some are inherently vicious (e.g. envy).

Thomist ethics hold that it is necessary to observe both circumstances and intention to determine an action's moral value, and therefore Aquinas cannot be said to be strictly either a deontologicalist or a consequentialist. Rather, he would say that an action is morally good if it fulfills God's antecedent will.

Of note is the principle of double effect, formulated in the Summa, II-II, Q.64, art.7, which is a justification of homicide in self-defense. Previously experiencing difficulties in the world of Christian philosophy, the doctrine of Just War was expounded by Aquinas with this principle. He says:

In order for a war to be just, three things are necessary. First, the authority of the sovereign by whose command the war is to be waged... Secondly, a just cause is required, namely that those who are attacked, should be attacked because they deserve it on account of some fault... Thirdly, it is necessary that the belligerents should have a rightful intention, so that they intend the advancement of good, or the avoidance of evil...

— Summa, II-II, Q.40, art.1.

=== Law ===
Thomism recognizes four different species of law, which he defines as "an ordinance of reason for the common good, made by him who has care of the community, and promulgated":

1. Eternal law, which is "the type of Divine Wisdom, as directing all actions and movements;"
2. Natural law, "whereby each one knows, and is conscious of, what is good and what is evil", which is the rational being's participation in the eternal law;
3. Human or temporal law, laws made by humans by necessity; and
4. Divine law, which are moral imperatives specifically given through revelation.

The development of natural law is one of the most influential parts of Thomist philosophy. Aquinas says that "[the law of nature] is nothing other than the light of the intellect planted in us by God, by which we know what should be done and what should be avoided. God gave this light and this law in creation... For no one is ignorant that what he would not like to be done to himself he should not do to others, and similar norms."

Aquinas argues that the Mosaic covenant was divine, though rightfully only given to the Jews before Christ; whereas the New Covenant replaces the Old Covenant and is meant for all humans.

=== Free will ===
Aquinas argues that there is no contradiction between God's providence and human free will:

... just as by moving natural causes [God] does not prevent their acts being natural, so by moving voluntary causes He does not deprive their actions of being voluntary: but rather is He the cause of this very thing in them; for He operates in each thing according to its own nature.

— Summa, I., Q.83, art.1.

Aquinas argues that God offers man both a prevenient grace to enable him to perform supernaturally good works, and cooperative grace within the same. The relation of prevenient grace to voluntariness has been the subject of further debate; the position known here as "Thomist" was originated by Domingo Báñez and says that God gives an additional grace (the "efficient grace") to the predestined which makes them accept, while Luis de Molina held that God distributes grace according to a middle knowledge, and man can accept it without a different grace. Molinism is a school that is part of Thomism in the general sense (it originated in commentaries to Aquinas), yet it must be borne in mind that, here, Thomism and Molinism oppose each other. (The question has been declared undecided by the Holy See.)

== Epistemology ==
"Whatever is in our intellect must have previously been in the senses."

— Thomas Aquinas, the peripatetic axiom.

Aquinas preceded the existence of the discipline of epistemology, which began among modern thinkers whose positions, following in the wake of Descartes, are fundamentally opposed to Aquinas'. Nonetheless, a Thomistic theory of knowledge can be derived from a mixture of Aquinas' logical, psychological, metaphysical, and even Theological doctrines. Aquinas' thought is an instance of the correspondence theory of truth, which says that something is true "when it conforms to the external reality." Therefore, any being that exists can be said to be true insofar that it participates in the world.

Aristotle's De anima (On the Soul) divides the mind into three parts: sensation, imagination and intellection. When one perceives an object, his mind composites a sense-image. When he remembers the object he previously sensed, he is imagining its form (the image of the imagination is often translated as "phantasm"). When he extracts information from this phantasm, he is using his intellect. Consequently, all human knowledge concerning universals (such as species and properties) are derived from the phantasm ("the received is in the receiver according to the mode of the receiver"), which itself is a recollection of an experience. Concerning the question of "Whether the intellect can actually understand through the intelligible species of which it is possessed, without turning to the phantasms?" in the Summa Theologica, Aquinas quotes Aristotle in the sed contra: "the soul understands nothing without a phantasm." Hence the peripatetic axiom. (Another theorem to be drawn from this is that error is a result of drawing false conclusions based on our sensations.)

Aquinas' epistemological theory would later be classified as empiricism, for holding that sensations are a necessary step in acquiring knowledge, and that deductions cannot be made from pure reason.

== Impact ==
Aquinas shifted Scholasticism away from neoplatonism and towards Aristotle. The ensuing school of thought, through its influence on Catholicism and the ethics of the Catholic school, is one of the most influential philosophies of all time, also significant due to the number of people living by its teachings.

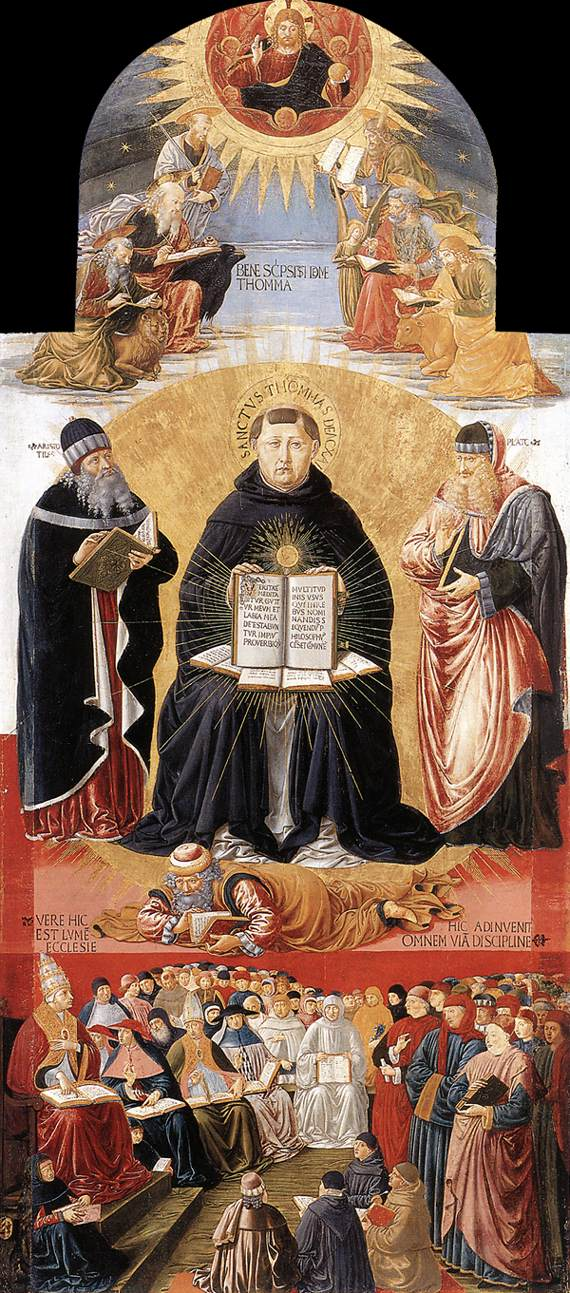
Triumph of St Thomas Aquinas, Benozzo Gozzoli,1471. Louvre, Paris

Before Aquinas' death, Stephen Tempier, Bishop of Paris, forbade certain positions associated with Aquinas (especially his denial of both universal hylomorphism and a plurality of substantial forms in a single substance) to be taught in the Faculty of Arts at Paris. Through the influence of traditional Augustinian theologians, some theses of Aquinas were condemned in 1277 by the ecclesiastical authorities of Paris and Oxford (the most important theological schools in the Middle Ages). The Franciscan Order opposed the ideas of the Dominican Aquinas, while the Dominicans institutionally took up the defense of his work (1286), and thereafter adopted it as an official philosophy of the order to be taught in their studia. Early opponents of Aquinas include William de la Mare, Henry of Ghent, Giles of Rome, and John Duns Scotus.

Early and noteworthy defenders of Aquinas were his former teacher Albertus Magnus, the ill-fated Richard Knapwell, William Macclesfeld, Giles of Lessines, John of Quidort, Bernard of Auvergne and Thomas of Sutton. The canonization of Aquinas in 1323 led to a revocation of the condemnation of 1277. Later, Aquinas and his school would find a formidable opponent in the via moderna, particularly in William of Ockham and his adherents.

Thomism remained a doctrine held principally by Dominican theologians, such as Giovanni Capreolo (1380–1444) or Tommaso de Vio (1468–1534). Eventually, in the 16th century, Thomism found a stronghold on the Iberian Peninsula, through for example the Dominicans Francisco de Vitoria (particularly noteworthy for his work in natural law theory), Domingo de Soto (notable for his work on economic theory), John of St. Thomas, and Domingo Báñez; the Carmelites of Salamanca (i.e., the Salmanticenses); and even, in a way, the newly formed Jesuits, particularly Francisco Suárez, and Luis de Molina.

The modern period brought considerable difficulty for Thomism.

Pope Leo XIII attempted a Thomistic revival, particularly with his 1879 encyclical Aeterni Patris and his establishment of the Leonine Commission, established to produce critical editions of Aquinas' opera omnia. This encyclical served as the impetus for the rise of Neothomism, which brought an emphasis on the ethical parts of Thomism, as well as a large part of its views on life, humans, and theology, are found in the various schools of Neothomism. Neothomism held sway as the dominant philosophy of the Roman Catholic Church until the Second Vatican Council, which seemed, in the eyes of Homiletic and Pastoral Review writer Fr. Brian Van Hove, SJ, to confirm the significance of Ressourcement theology.

Thomism remains a school of philosophy today, and influential in Catholicism, though "The Church has no philosophy of her own nor does she canonize any one particular philosophy in preference to others."

In recent years, the cognitive neuroscientist Walter Freeman proposes that Thomism is the philosophical system explaining cognition that is most compatible with neurodynamics, in a 2008 article in the journal Mind and Matter entitled "Nonlinear Brain Dynamics and Intention According to Aquinas."

== Connection with Jewish thought ==
Aquinas did not disdain to draw upon Jewish philosophical sources. His main work, the Summa Theologica, shows a profound knowledge not only of the writings of Avicebron (Ibn Gabirol), whose name he mentions, but also of most Jewish philosophical works then existing.

Aquinas pronounces himself energetically against the hypothesis of the eternity of the world, in agreement with both Christian and Jewish theology. But as this theory is attributed to Aristotle, he seeks to demonstrate that the latter did not express himself categorically on this subject. "The argument", said he, "which Aristotle presents to support this thesis is not properly called a demonstration, but is only a reply to the theories of those ancients who supposed that this world had a beginning and who gave only impossible proofs. There are three reasons for believing that Aristotle himself attached only a relative value to this reasoning..." In this, Aquinas paraphrases Maimonides' Guide for the Perplexed, where those reasons are given.

== Scholarly perspectives ==
=== René Descartes ===
Thomism began to decline in popularity in the modern period, which was inaugurated by René Descartes' works Discourse on the Method in 1637 and Meditations on First Philosophy in 1641. The Cartesian doctrines of mind–body dualism and the fallibility of the senses implicitly contradicted Aristotle and Aquinas:

But, meanwhile, I feel greatly astonished when I observe [the weakness of my mind, and] its proneness to error. For although, without at all giving expression to what I think, I consider all this in my own mind, words yet occasionally impede my progress, and I am almost led into error by the terms of ordinary language. We say, for example, that we see the same wax when it is before us, and not that we judge it to be the same from its retaining the same color and figure: whence I should forthwith be disposed to conclude that the wax is known by the act of sight, and not by the intuition of the mind alone, were it not for the analogous instance of human beings passing on in the street below, as observed from a window. In this case I do not fail to say that I see the men themselves, just as I say that I see the wax; and yet what do I see from the window beyond hats and cloaks that might cover artificial machines, whose motions might be determined by springs? But I judge that there are human beings from these appearances, and thus I comprehend, by the faculty of judgment alone which is in the mind, what I believed I saw with my eyes.

— Meditations on First Philosophy, Med. II, §13.

=== G. K. Chesterton ===
In describing Thomism as a philosophy of common sense, G. K. Chesterton wrote:

Since the modern world began in the sixteenth century, nobody's system of philosophy has really corresponded to everybody's sense of reality; to what, if left to themselves, common men would call common sense. Each started with a paradox; a peculiar point of view demanding the sacrifice of what they would call a sane point of view. That is the one thing common to Hobbes and Hegel, to Kant and Bergson, to Berkeley and William James. A man had to believe something that no normal man would believe, if it were suddenly propounded to his simplicity; as that law is above right, or right is outside reason, or things are only as we think them, or everything is relative to a reality that is not there. The modern philosopher claims, like a sort of confidence man, that if we will grant him this, the rest will be easy; he will straighten out the world, if he is allowed to give this one twist to the mind...

Against all this the philosophy of St. Thomas stands founded on the universal common conviction that eggs are eggs. The Hegelian may say that an egg is really a hen, because it is a part of an endless process of Becoming; the Berkelian may hold that poached eggs only exist as a dream exists, since it is quite as easy to call the dream the cause of the eggs as the eggs the cause of the dream; the Pragmatist may believe that we get the best out of scrambled eggs by forgetting that they ever were eggs, and only remembering the scramble. But no pupil of St. Thomas needs to addle his brains in order adequately to addle his eggs; to put his head at any peculiar angle in looking at eggs, or squinting at eggs, or winking the other eye in order to see a new simplification of eggs. The Thomist stands in the broad daylight of the brotherhood of men, in their common consciousness that eggs are not hens or dreams or mere practical assumptions; but things attested by the Authority of the Senses, which is from God.

— Chesterton, Saint Thomas Aquinas, p. 147.

== History ==
J. A. Weisheipl emphasizes that within the Dominican Order the history of Thomism has been continuous since the time of Aquinas:

Thomism was always alive in the Dominican Order, small as it was after the ravages of the Reformation, the French Revolution, and the Napoleonic occupation. Repeated legislation of the General Chapters, beginning after the death of St. Thomas, as well as the Constitutions of the Order, required all Dominicans to teach the doctrine of St. Thomas both in philosophy and in theology.

An idea of the longstanding historic continuity of Dominican Thomism may be derived from the list of people associated with the Pontifical University of St. Thomas Aquinas.

Outside the Dominican Order, Thomism has had varying fortunes leading some to periodize it historically or thematically. Weisheipl distinguishes "wide" Thomism, which includes those who claim to follow the spirit and basic insights of Aquinas and manifest an evident dependence on his texts, from "eclectic" Thomism which includes those with a willingness to allow the influence of other philosophical and theological systems in order to relativize the principles and conclusions of traditional Thomism. John Haldane gives an historic division of Thomism including 1) the period of Aquinas and his first followers from the 13th to 15th centuries, a second Thomism from the 16th to 18th centuries, and a Neo-Thomism from the 19th to 20th centuries.

One might justifiably articulate other historical divisions on the basis of shifts in perspective on Aquinas' work including the period immediately following Aquinas' canonization in 1325, the period following the Council of Trent, and the period after the Second Vatican Council. Romanus Cessario thinks it better not to identify intervals of time or periods within the larger history of Thomism because Thomists have addressed such a broad variety of issues and in too many geographical areas to permit such divisions.

=== First Thomistic School ===
The first period of Thomism stretches from Aquinas' teaching activity beginning in 1256 at Paris to Cologne, Orvieto, Viterbo, Rome, and Naples until his canonization in 1325. In this period his doctrines "were both attacked and defended" as for example after his death (1274) the condemnations of 1277, 1284 and 1286 were counteracted by the General Chapters of the Dominican Order and other disciples who came to Aquinas' defense.

=== 1325 to the Council of Trent ===
After Aquinas' canonisation, commentaries on Aquinas increased, especially at Cologne which had previously been a stronghold of Albert the Great's thought. Henry of Gorkum (1386-1431) wrote what may well be the earliest commentary on the Summa Theologiae, followed in due course by his student Denis the Carthusian.

=== Council of Trent to Aeterni Patris ===
Responding to prevailing philosophical rationalism during the Enlightenment Salvatore Roselli, professor of theology at the College of St. Thomas, the future Pontifical University of Saint Thomas Aquinas, Angelicum in Rome, published a six volume Summa philosophica (1777) giving an Aristotelian interpretation of Aquinas validating the senses as a source of knowledge. While teaching at the College Roselli is considered to have laid the foundation for Neothomism in the nineteenth century. According to historian J.A. Weisheipl in the late 18th and early 19th centuries "everyone who had anything to do with the revival of Thomism in Italy, Spain and France was directly influenced by Roselli's monumental work.

=== Aeterni Patris to Vatican II ===
The Thomist revival that began in the mid-19th century, sometimes called "neo-scholasticism" or "neo-Thomism", can be traced to figures such as Angelicum professor Tommaso Maria Zigliara, Jesuits Josef Kleutgen, and Giovanni Maria Cornoldi, and secular priest Gaetano Sanseverino. This movement received impetus from Pope Leo XIII's encyclical Aeterni Patris of 1879. Generally the revival accepts the interpretative tradition of Aquinas' great commentators such as Capréolus, Cajetan, and John of St. Thomas. Its focus, however, is less exegetical and more concerned with carrying out the program of deploying a rigorously worked out system of Thomistic metaphysics in a wholesale critique of modern philosophy. Other seminal figures in the early part of the century include Martin Grabmann (1875-1949) and Amato Masnovo (1880-1955). The movement's core philosophical commitments are summarized in "Twenty-Four Thomistic Theses" approved by Pope Pius X.

In the first half of the twentieth century Angelicum professors Edouard Hugon, Réginald Garrigou-Lagrange among others, carried on Leo's call for a Thomist revival. Their approach is reflected in many of the manuals and textbooks widely in use in Roman Catholic colleges and seminaries before Vatican II.

While the Second Vatican Council took place from 1962 to 1965 Cornelio Fabro was already able to write in 1949 that the century of revival with its urgency to provide a synthetic systematization and defense of Aquinas' thought was coming to an end. Fabro looked forward to a more constructive period in which the original context of Aquinas' thought would be explored. Carol Jackson Robinson wrote popular articles and books in the service of Thomism after Vatican II.

== Recent schools and interpretations ==
A summary of some recent and current schools and interpretations of Thomism can be found, among other places, in La Metafisica di san Tommaso d'Aquino e i suoi interpreti (2002), by Battista Mondin, Being and Some 20th Century Thomists (2003), by John F. X. Knasas as well as in the writing of Edward Feser.

=== Neo-Scholastic Thomism ===
Neo-Scholastic Thomism identifies with the philosophical and theological tradition stretching back to the time of St. Thomas. In the nineteenth century authors such as Tommaso Maria Zigliara focused not only on exegesis of the historical Aquinas but also on the articulation of a rigorous system of orthodox Thomism to be used as an instrument of critique of contemporary thought.

Due to its suspicion of attempts to harmonize Aquinas with non-Thomistic categories and assumptions, Neo-Scholastic Thomism has sometimes been called "strict observance Thomism". A discussion of recent and current Neo-Scholastic Thomism can be found in La Metafisica di san Tommaso d'Aquino e i suoi interpreti (2002) by Battista Mondin, which includes such figures as Martin Grabmann, Reginald Garrigou-Lagrange, Sofia Vanni Rovighi (1908–1990), Cornelio Fabro (1911–1995), Carlo Giacon (1900–1984), Tomáš Týn (1950–1990), Abelardo Lobato (1925–2012), Leo Elders (1926–2019) and Giovanni Ventimiglia (b. 1964) among others. Fabro in particular emphasizes Aquinas' originality, especially with respect to the actus essendi or act of existence of finite beings by participating in being itself. Other scholars such as those involved with the "Progetto Tommaso" seek to establish an objective and universal reading of Aquinas' texts.

=== Cracow Circle Thomism ===
Cracow Circle Thomism (named after Kraków) has been called "the most significant expression of Catholic thought between the two World Wars." The Circle was founded by a group of philosophers and theologians that in distinction to more traditional Neo-Scholastic Thomism embraced modern formal logic as an analytical tool for traditional Thomist philosophy and theology.

Inspired by the logical clarity of Aquinas, members of the Circle held both philosophy and theology to contain "propositions with truth-values…a structured body of propositions connected in meaning and subject matter, and linked by logical relations of compatibility and incompatibility, entailment etc." "The Cracow Circle set about investigating and where possible improving this logical structure with the most advanced logical tools available at the time, namely those of modern mathematical logic, then called 'logistic'."

=== Existential Thomism ===
Étienne Gilson (1884–1978), the key proponent of existential Thomism, tended to emphasize the importance of historical exegesis but also to deemphasize Aquinas's continuity with the Aristotelian tradition, and like Cornelio Fabro of the Neo-scholastic school, to highlight the originality of Aquinas's doctrine of being as existence. He was also critical of the Neo-Scholastics' focus on the tradition of the commentators, and given what he regarded as their insufficient emphasis on being or existence accused them of "essentialism" (to allude to the other half of Aquinas's distinction between being and essence). Gilson's reading of Aquinas as putting forward a distinctively "Christian philosophy" tended, at least in the view of his critics, to blur Aquinas's distinction between philosophy and theology. Jacques Maritain (1882–1973) introduced into Thomistic metaphysics the notion that philosophical reflection begins with an "intuition of being", and in ethics and social philosophy sought to harmonize Thomism with personalism and pluralistic democracy. Though "existential Thomism" was sometimes presented as a counterpoint to modern existentialism, the main reason for the label is the emphasis this approach puts on Aquinas's doctrine of existence. Other proponents include Joseph Owens, Eugene Fairweather, and John F. X. Knasas.

=== River Forest Thomism ===
According to River Forest Thomism (named after River Forest, Illinois), the natural sciences are epistemologically prior to metaphysics, preferably called metascience. This approach emphasizes the Aristotelian foundations of Aquinas's philosophy, and in particular the idea that the construction of a sound metaphysics must be preceded by a sound understanding of natural science, as interpreted in light of an Aristotelian philosophy of nature. Accordingly, it is keen to show that modern physical science can and should be given such an interpretation. Charles De Koninck, Raymond Jude Nogar, James A. Weisheipl, William A. Wallace, and Benedict Ashley, are among its representatives. It is sometimes called "Laval Thomism" after Laval University in Quebec City, where De Koninck was a professor. The alternative label "River Forest Thomism" derives from a suburb of Chicago, the location of the Albertus Magnus Lyceum for Natural Science, whose members have been associated with this approach. It is also sometimes called "Aristotelian Thomism" (to highlight its contrast with Gilson's brand of existential Thomism) though since Neo-Scholastic Thomism also emphasizes Aquinas's continuity with Aristotle, this label seems a bit too proprietary. (There are writers, like the contemporary Thomist Ralph McInerny who have exhibited both Neo-Scholastic and Laval/River Forest influences, and the approaches are not necessarily incompatible.)

=== Transcendental Thomism ===
Unlike the first three schools mentioned above, transcendental Thomism, associated with Joseph Maréchal (1878–1944), Karl Rahner (1904–84), and Bernard Lonergan (1904–84), does not oppose modern philosophy wholesale, but seeks to reconcile Thomism with a Cartesian subject-centered approach to knowledge in general, and Kantian transcendental philosophy in particular. To Feser, "It seems fair to say that most Thomists otherwise tolerant of diverse approaches to Aquinas's thought tend to regard transcendental Thomism as having conceded too much to modern philosophy genuinely to count as a variety of Thomism, strictly speaking, and this school of thought has in any event been far more influential among theologians than among philosophers."

=== Lublin Thomism ===
Lublin Thomism, which derives its name from the Catholic University of Lublin in Poland where it is centered, is also sometimes called "phenomenological Thomism". Like transcendental Thomism, it seeks to combine Thomism with certain elements of modern philosophy. In particular, it seeks to make use of the phenomenological method of philosophical analysis associated with Edmund Husserl and the ethical personalism of writers like Max Scheler in articulating the Thomist conception of the human person. Its best-known proponent is Karol Wojtyla (1920–2005), who went on to become Pope John Paul II.

However, unlike transcendental Thomism, the metaphysics of Lublin Thomism places priority on existence (as opposed to essence), making it an existential Thomism that demonstrates consonance with the Thomism of Étienne Gilson. The phenomenological concerns of the Lublin school are not metaphysical in nature as this would constitute idealism. Rather, they are considerations which are brought into relation with central positions of the school, such as when dealing with modern science, its epistemological value, and its relation to metaphysics.

=== Analytical Thomism ===
Analytical Thomism described by John Haldane, its key proponent, as "a broad philosophical approach that brings into mutual relationship the styles and preoccupations of recent English-speaking philosophy and the concepts and concerns shared by Aquinas and his followers" (from the article on "analytical Thomism" in The Oxford Companion to Philosophy, edited by Ted Honderich). By "recent English-speaking philosophy" Haldane means the analytical tradition founded by thinkers like Gottlob Frege, Bertrand Russell, G. E. Moore, and Ludwig Wittgenstein, which tends to dominate academic philosophy in the English-speaking world. Elizabeth Anscombe (1919–2001) and her husband Peter Geach are sometimes considered the first "analytical Thomists", though (like most writers to whom this label has been applied) they did not describe themselves in these terms, and as Haldane's somewhat vague expression "mutual relationship" indicates, there does not seem to be any set of doctrines held in common by all analytical Thomists. What they do have in common seems to be that they are philosophers trained in the analytic tradition who happen to be interested in Aquinas in some way; and the character of their "analytical Thomism" is determined by whether it tends to stress the "analytical" side of analytical Thomism, or the "Thomism" side, or, alternatively, attempts to emphasize both sides equally.

== 24 Thomistic theses of Pius X ==
With the decree Postquam sanctissimus of 27 July 1914, Pope Pius X stated that 24 theses formulated by "teachers from various institutions [...] clearly contain the principles and more important thoughts" of Aquinas.

On March 7, 1916, the Congregation of Studies, which in the meantime had become the Sacred Congregation of Seminaries and Universities, while confirming that the twenty-four theses did in fact express the authentic teaching of Saint Thomas, replied by ordering only that they be proposed by the professors to their students as safe rules of guidance.

=== Ontology ===
1. Potency and Act divide being in such a way that whatever is, is either pure act, or of necessity it is composed of potency and act as primary and intrinsic principles.
2. Since act is perfection, it is not limited except through a potency which itself is a capacity for perfection. Hence in any order in which an act is pure act, it will only exist, in that order, as a unique and unlimited act. But whenever it is finite and manifold, it has entered into a true composition with potency.
3. Consequently, the one God, unique and simple, alone subsists in absolute being. All other things that participate in being have a nature whereby their being is restricted; they are constituted of essence and being, as really distinct principles.
4. A thing is called a being because of "esse". God and creature are not called beings univocally, nor wholly equivocally, but analogically, by an analogy both of attribution and of proportionality.
5. In every creature there is also a real composition of the subsisting subject and of added secondary forms, i.e. accidental forms. Such composition cannot be understood unless being is really received in an essence distinct from it.
6. Besides the absolute accidents there is also the relative accident, relation. Although by reason of its own character relation does not signify anything inhering in another, it nevertheless often has a cause in things, and hence a real entity distinct from the subject.
7. A spiritual creature is wholly simple in its essence. Yet there is still a twofold composition in the spiritual creature, namely, that of the essence with being, and that of the substance with accidents.
8. However, the corporeal creature is composed of act and potency even in its very essence. These act and potency in the order of essence are designated by the names form and matter respectively.

=== Cosmology ===
1. Neither the matter nor the form have being of themselves, nor are they produced or corrupted of themselves, nor are they included in any category otherwise than reductively, as substantial principles.
2. Although extension in quantitative parts follows upon a corporeal nature, nevertheless it is not the same for a body to be a substance and for it to be quantified. For of itself substance is indivisible, not indeed as a point is indivisible, but as that which falls outside the order of dimensions is indivisible. But quantity, which gives the substance extension, really differs from the substance and is truly an accident.
3. The principle of individuation, i.e., of numerical distinction of one individual from another with the same specific nature, is matter designated by quantity. Thus in pure spirits there cannot be more than one individual in the same specific nature.
4. By virtue of a body's quantity itself, the body is circumscriptively in a place, and in one place alone circumscriptively, no matter what power might be brought to bear.
5. Bodies are divided into two groups; for some are living and others are devoid of life. In the case of the living things, in order that there be in the same subject an essentially moving part and an essentially moved part, the substantial form, which is designated by the name soul, requires an organic disposition, i.e. heterogeneous parts.

=== Psychology ===
1. Souls in the vegetative and sensitive orders cannot subsist of themselves, nor are they produced of themselves. Rather, they are no more than principles whereby the living thing exists and lives; and since they are wholly dependent upon matter, they are incidentally corrupted through the corruption of the composite.
2. On the other hand, the human soul subsists of itself. When it can be infused into a sufficiently disposed subject, it is created by God. By its very nature, it is incorruptible and immortal.
3. This rational soul is united to the body in such a manner that it is the only substantial form of the body. By virtue of his soul a man is a man, an animal, a living thing, a body, a substance and a being. Therefore, the soul gives man every essential degree of perfection; moreover, it gives the body a share in the act of being whereby it itself exists.
4. From the human soul there naturally issue forth powers pertaining to two orders, the organic and the non-organic. The organic powers, among which are the senses, have the composite as their subject. The non-organic powers have the soul alone as their subject. Hence, the intellect is a power intrinsically independent of any bodily organ.
5. Intellectuality necessarily follows upon immateriality, and furthermore, in such manner that the further the distance from matter, the higher the degree of intellectuality. Any being is the adequate object of understanding in general. But in the present state of union of soul and body, quantities abstracted from the material conditions of individuality are the proper object of the human intellect.
6. Therefore, we receive knowledge from sensible things. But since sensible things are not actually intelligible, in addition to the intellect, which formally understands, an active power must be acknowledged in the soul, which power abstracts intelligible likeness or species from sense images in the imagination.
7. Through these intelligible likenesses or species we directly know universals, i.e. the natures of things. We attain to singulars by our senses, and also by our intellect, when it beholds the sense images. But we ascend to knowledge of spiritual things by analogy.
8. The will does not precede the intellect but follows upon it. The will necessarily desires that which is presented to it as a good in every respect satisfying the appetite. But it freely chooses among the many goods that are presented to it as desirable according to a changeable judgment or evaluation. Consequently, the choice follows the final practical judgment. But the will is the cause of it being the final one.

=== God ===
1. We do not perceive by an immediate intuition that God exists, nor do we prove it a priori. But we do prove it a posteriori, i.e., from the things that have been created, following an argument from the effects to the cause: namely, from things which are moved and cannot be the adequate source of their motion, to a first unmoved mover; from the production of the things in this world by causes subordinated to one another, to a first uncaused cause; from corruptible things which equally might be or not be, to an absolutely necessary being; from things which more or less are, live, and understand, according to degrees of being, living and understanding, to that which is maximally understanding, maximally living and maximally a being; finally, from the order of all things, to a separated intellect which has ordered and organized things, and directs them to their end.
2. The metaphysical motion of the Divine Essence is correctly expressed by saying that it is identified with the exercised actuality of its own being, or that it is subsistent being itself. And this is the reason for its infinite and unlimited perfection.
3. By reason of the very purity of His being, God is distinguished from all finite beings. Hence it follows, in the first place, that the world could only have come from God by creation; secondly, that not even by way of a miracle can any finite nature be given creative power, which of itself directly attains the very being of any being; and finally, that no created agent can in any way influence the being of any effect unless it has itself been moved by the first Cause.

== Criticism ==
In 1277, Étienne Tempier, the bishop of Paris who had condemned the studying of Aristotelian logic by Christian theologians in 1270, issued another more extensive condemnation. One aim of this condemnation was to clarify that God's absolute power transcended any principles of logic that Aristotle or Averroes might place on it. More specifically, it contained a list of 219 propositions, including twenty Thomistic propositions, that the bishop had determined to violate the omnipotence of God. However Tempier's condemnation of Thomism was withdrawn after the canonization of Thomas Aquinas.

Thomism has also been criticised in the Eastern Orthodox Church for giving greater importance to the works of virtuous pagans like Plato and Aristotle over that of the Church Fathers. Prochoros Kydones, a Greek scholar from the monastic brethren of Great Lavra who opposed the teachings of Gregory Palamas on the basis of Thomism, was condemned at a Patriarchal Synod of 1368 organised by the Patriarch of Constantinople Philotheos Kokkinos, where Thomism itself was also condemned.

Speaking on the Thomistic interpretation of transubstantiation, Eastern Orthodox theologian Vladimir Lossky states

Roman Catholicism rationalizes even the sacrament of the Eucharist: it interprets spiritual action as purely material and debases the sacrament to such an extent that it becomes in its view a kind of atomistic miracle. The Orthodox Church has no metaphysical theory of Transsubstantiation, and there is no need of such a theory. Christ is the Lord of the elements and it is in His power to do so that 'every thing, without in the least changing its physical substance' could become His Body. Christ's Body in the Eucharist is not physical flesh.

— Lossky 1969, p. 87

In his Against Henry, King of the English, Luther criticized a perceived use of the proof by assertion and a reliance on style over substance in the Thomist form of disputation, which he alleged as being, "It seems so to me. I think so. I believe so." Luther also argued that the Thomist method led to shallowness among theological debates in England at the time.

Thomism was criticized by Bertrand Russell in A History of Western Philosophy (1946). Neo-Thomism has been criticized by Catholic modernists such as George Tyrell and by supporters of the Nouvelle théologie.

== See also ==
- List of works by Thomas Aquinas
- Theism
- Catholic theology
- Criticism of the Catholic Church § Nature of theology
- Brian Davies
- Peter Kreeft
- Brian Leftow
- List of Thomist writers (13th–18th centuries)
- Alasdair MacIntyre
- Rule according to higher law
- Rule of law
- School of Salamanca
- The Thomist
- Thomistic sacramental theology
- Thomistic Institute
