= Analytical Thomism =

Philosophical movement

Analytical Thomism is a philosophical movement which promotes the interchange of ideas between the thought of Thomas Aquinas (including the philosophy carried on in relation to his thinking, called 'Thomism'), and modern analytic philosophy. It is a branch of analytic scholasticism that draws on other scholastic sources, especially John Duns Scotus.

Scottish philosopher John Haldane coined the term in the early 1990s, and has since been one of the movement's leading proponents. According to Haldane, "analytical Thomism involves the bringing into mutual relationship of the styles and preoccupations of recent English-speaking philosophy and the ideas and concerns shared by St. Thomas and his followers".

== History ==
The modern revival of Aquinas's thought can be traced to the work of mid-19th Century thomists, such as Tommaso Maria Zigliara, Josef Kleutgen, Gaetano Sanseverino, and Giovanni Maria Cornoldi. This movement received an enormous impetus by Pope Leo XIII's encyclical Aeterni Patris of 1879. In the first half of the twentieth century, Edouard Hugon, Réginald Garrigou-Lagrange, Étienne Gilson, and Jacques Maritain, among others, carried on Leo's call for a Thomist revival. Gilson and Maritain in particular taught and lectured throughout Europe and North America, influencing a generation of English-speaking Catholic philosophers. Some of the latter then began to harmonize Thomism with broader contemporary philosophical trends.

Similarly, the Kraków Circle in Poland used mathematical logic in presenting Thomism, which the Circle judged to have "a structured body of propositions connected in meaning and subject matter, and linked by logical relations of compatibility and incompatibility, entailment, etc." The Circle has been said to be "the most significant expression of Catholic thought between the two World Wars".

By the middle of the 20th century, Aquinas's thought came into dialogue with the analytical tradition through the work of G. E. M. Anscombe, Peter Geach, and Anthony Kenny. Anscombe was Ludwig Wittgenstein's student, and his successor at the University of Cambridge; she was married to Geach, himself an accomplished logician and philosopher of religion. Geach had converted to Roman Catholicism while studying at Oxford, Anscombe had converted before she came up, and both were instructed in the Faith in Oxford by the Dominican Richard Kehoe, who received them both into the Church before they met one another. Kenny, an erstwhile priest and former Catholic, became a prominent philosopher at the University of Oxford and an editor and executor of Wittgenstein's literary estate, and is still portrayed by some as a promoter of Aquinas (Paterson & Pugh, xiii-xxiii), though his denial of some basic Thomist doctrines (e.g. divine timelessness) casts doubt on this.

Anscombe, and other Aristotelians such as Alasdair MacIntyre, Philippa Foot, Mortimer Adler, and John Finnis, can largely be credited with the revival of "virtue ethics" in analytic moral theory and "natural law theory" in jurisprudence. Both movements draw significantly upon Aquinas.

== Notable analytical Thomists ==
Philosophers and theologians working in the intersection of Thomism and analytic philosophy include:

- Mortimer Adler (1902–2001): Columbia University, University of Chicago, Center for the Study of the Great Ideas
- Robert Alspaugh: St. Anselm's Abbey School
- G. E. M. Anscombe (1919–2001): University of Oxford, University of Cambridge
- David Braine (1940–2017): University of Aberdeen
- Christopher Bobier: Central Michigan University
- Józef Maria Bocheński: Pontifical University of Saint Thomas Aquinas
- Jeffrey Brower: Calvin College, Purdue University
- David Burrell (1933–2023): University of Notre Dame
- John C. Cahalan: independent
- Brian Davies (1951–): University of Oxford, Fordham University
- Gabriele De Anna: University of Padua, University of Udine, University of Cambridge, University of Bamberg
- Edward Feser (1968–): Pasadena City College
- John Finnis (1940–): University of Oxford, University of Notre Dame
- Peter Geach (1916–2013): University of Birmingham, University of Leeds
- Michał Głowala: University of Wrocław
- John Haldane (1954–): University of St Andrews, Georgetown University, Baylor University
- Simon Hewitt: University of Leeds
- Jonathan Jacobs: Colgate University, John Jay College of Criminal Justice
- Andrew Jaeger: University of Nebraska–Lincoln, Benedictine College
- Anthony Kenny: University of Oxford
- Fergus Kerr (1931–2025): University of Oxford
- Gyula Klima (1956–): Yale University, University of Notre Dame, Fordham University
- Robert C. Koons (1957–): University of Texas at Austin
- Norman Kretzmann (1928–1998): Cornell University
- John R. T. Lamont: University of Manitoba, University of Oxford, Catholic Institute of Sydney, University of Notre Dame Australia, Campion College, Australian Catholic University
- Anthony J. Lisska (1940–2022): Denison University
- Alasdair MacIntyre (1929–2025): Brandeis University, Boston University, Wellesley College, Vanderbilt University, University of Notre Dame, Duke University
- James Madden: Benedictine College
- Bruce D. Marshall (1955–): St. Olaf College, Southern Methodist University
- William Marshner (1943–): Christendom College
- Christopher Martin: University of St. Thomas (Texas)
- Herbert McCabe (1926–2001): University of Oxford
- Scott MacDonald: University of Iowa, Cornell University
- Sandra L. Menssen: University of St. Thomas (Minnesota)
- Cyrille Michon (1963–): Paris-Sorbonne University, Nantes University
- Mark C. Murphy (1968–): Georgetown University, Notre Dame University
- John P. O'Callaghan: Creighton University, University of Portland, University of Notre Dame, Pontifical Academy of Saint Thomas Aquinas
- Robert Pasnau: Saint Joseph's University, University of Colorado Boulder
- Craig Paterson: Saint Louis University, Providence College, Johann Heinrich Pestalozzi Christian University
- Roger Pouivet: University of Lorraine
- Alexander Pruss (1973–): Georgetown University, Baylor University
- Matthew S. Pugh (20th century–2015): Ohio Dominican College, The Ohio State University, University of St. Thomas (Texas), Providence College
- Eleonore Stump (1947–): Oberlin College, Cornell University, Virginia Tech, University of Notre Dame, Saint Louis University
- Stanislav Sousedík (1931–): Charles University
- Michael Staron: Saint Anselm's Abbey School
- Thomas D. Sullivan: University of St. Thomas (Minnesota)
- Denys Turner (1942–): University of Bristol, University of Birmingham, University of Cambridge, Yale University
- Michael Thompson: University of California, Los Angeles, University of Pittsburgh
- T. Adam Van Wart: Ave Maria University
- Giovanni Ventimiglia (1964–): Faculty of Theology of Lugano, Aristotle College, University of Lucerne

== See also ==
- Analytic theology
- Meta-ethics
- Philosophy of religion
- Neo-scholasticism
