= Neo-scholasticism =

Revival of scholasticism

Neo-scholasticism, also known as neo-scholastic Thomism, or neo-Thomism because of the great influence of the writings of Thomas Aquinas on the movement, is a revival and development of medieval scholasticism in Catholic theology and scholastic philosophy, which began in the second half of the 19th century.

== Origins ==
During the medieval period, scholasticism became the standard accepted method of philosophy and theology. The Scholastic method declined with the advent of humanism in the 15th and 16th centuries, after which time it came to be viewed by some as rigid and formalistic. "Scholastic philosophy did not, however, completely disappear. An important movement of Scholastic revival took place during the 16th and 17th centuries and enriched Scholastic literature with many eminent contributions, in addition to adapting scholastic thought to modern problems and synthesising the currents of thought of various authors of medieval scholasticism, such as Thomism, Scotism or nominalism. Francisco de Vitoria (1483–1546), Thomas de Vio Cajetan (1469–1534), Gabriel Vásquez (1551–1604), Francisco de Toledo (1532–1596), Pedro da Fonseca (1528–1599), and especially Francisco Suárez (1548–1617) were profound thinkers, worthy of the great masters whose principles they had adopted." Moreover, as J. A. Weisheipl emphasises, within the Dominican Order Thomistic scholasticism has been continuous since the time of Aquinas: "Thomism was always alive in the Dominican Order, small as it was after the ravages of the Reformation, the French Revolution, and the Napoleonic occupation. Repeated legislation of the General Chapters, beginning after the death of St. Thomas, as well as the Constitutions of the Order, required all Dominicans to teach the doctrine of St. Thomas both in philosophy and in theology." A further idea of the longstanding historic continuity of Dominican scholasticism and neo-scholasticism may be derived from the list of people associated with the Pontifical University of St. Thomas Aquinas.

In the mid-19th century, interest in scholastic thought began once again to flourish, in large part in reaction against the Modernist current inspired by thinkers such as René Descartes, Immanuel Kant and Georg Hegel, whose principles were perceived to conflict with Christian dogma. Theological Modernism never coalesced into an authoritative doctrine; perhaps it was most clearly defined by Pius X in 1907, when he condemned it as ‘the synthesis of all heresies’. However, the most consistent threads of Modernist thought include: (1) the belief that revelation continues up to the present day and did not stop after the apostles; (2) the belief that dogmas are not immutable, and their formulas could change both in interpretation and content; (3) the use of the historical-critical method in biblical exegesis.

For many thinkers, the dangers of Modernism could only be overcome by a complete restoration of scholastic theology which culminated in Aquinas. His writings were increasingly viewed as the ultimate expression of orthodox philosophy and theology, to which all Catholic thought must remain faithful.

This was particularly vigorous at first in Italy. "The direct initiator of the neo-Scholastic movement in Italy was Gaetano Sanseverino (1811–1865), a canon at Naples." The influential German Jesuit Joseph Kleutgen (1811–83), who taught at Rome, argued that post-Cartesian philosophy undermined Catholic theology, and that its remedy was the Aristotelian scientific method of Aquinas. From 1874 to 1891, the Accademia di San Tommaso published the review La Scienza Italiana. Numerous works were produced by Giovanni Maria Cornoldi (1822–92), Giuseppe Pecci, Tommaso Maria Zigliara (1833–93), Satolli (1839–1909), Matteo Liberatore (1810–92), Barberis (1847–96), Schiffini (1841–1906), de Maria, Talamo, Lorenzelli, Ballerini, Mattiussi and others. The Italian writers at first laid special emphasis on the metaphysics of Scholasticism, and less on the empirical sciences or the history of philosophy.

Papal support for such trends began under Pope Pius IX, who praised the movement in various letters. The dogma of the Immaculate Conception (1854), the Syllabus of Errors (1864) and the proclamation of papal infallibility (1870) all heralded a move away from Modernist ideas.

The most decisive impetus was Pope Leo XIII's encyclical Aeterni Patris of 4 August 1879, which set out and strongly endorsed the principles of neo-scholasticism, calling for "Christian philosophy to be restored according to the spirit of St Thomas".

== Key principles ==
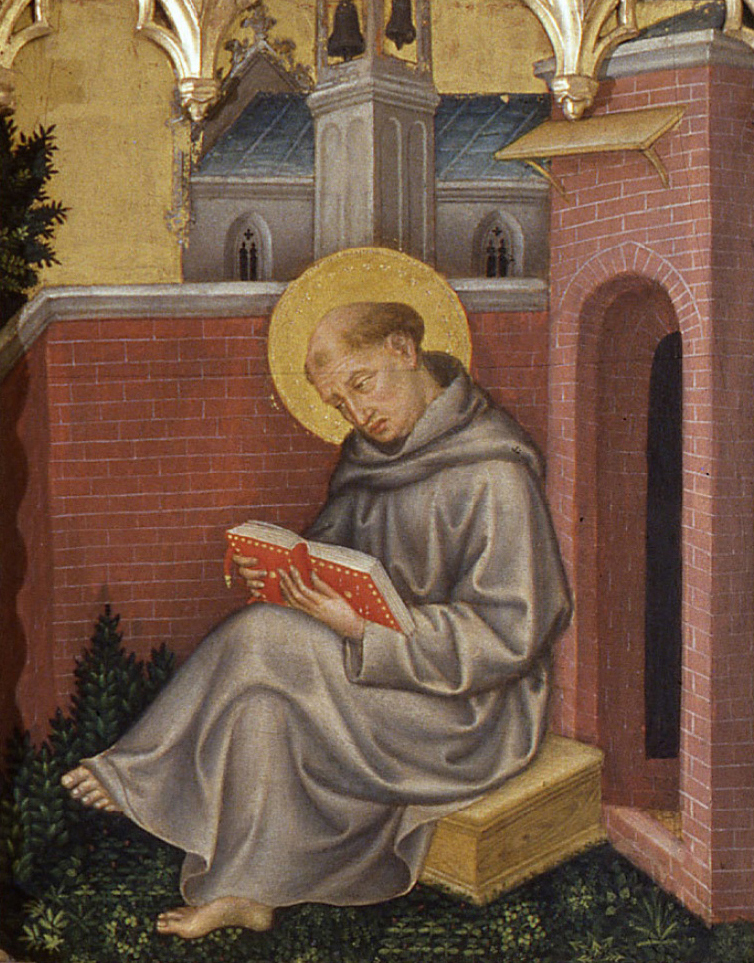
Thomas Aquinas

"Neo-Scholasticism is characterized by systematic investigation, analytical rigor, clear terminology, and argumentation that proceeds from first principles, chief among them that objective truth is both real and knowable." Neo-scholasticism sought to restore the fundamental doctrines embodied in the scholasticism of the 13th century, which may be summarised as follows:

1. God is pure actuality and absolute perfection, substantially distinct from every finite thing. He alone can create and preserve all beings other than Himself. His infinite knowledge includes all that was, is, or shall be, and all that is possible.

2. As to our knowledge of the material world: whatever exists is itself, an incommunicable, individual substance. To the core of self-sustaining reality, in the oak-tree for instance, other realities (accidents) are added—size, form, roughness, and so on. All oak-trees are identical in respect of certain constituent elements. Considering this likeness and even identity, our human intelligence groups them into one species and again, in view of their common characteristics, it ranges various species under one genus. Such is the Aristotelian solution of the problem of universals. Each substance is in its nature fixed and determined; and Scholasticism excludes a theory of evolution which would regard even the essences of things as products of change.

But this static conception requires as its complement a moderate dynamism, supplied by the central concepts of act and potency. Whatsoever changes is, just for that reason, limited. The oak-tree passes through a process of growth, of becoming: whatever is actually in it now was potentially in it from the beginning. Its vital functions go on unceasingly (accidental change); but the tree itself will die, and out of its decayed trunk other substances will come forth (substantial change). The theory of matter and form is simply an interpretation of the substantial changes which bodies undergo. The union of matter and form constitutes the essence of concrete being, and this essence is endowed with existence. Throughout all change and becoming there runs a rhythm of finality; the activities of the countless substances of the universe converge towards an end which is known to God; finality involves optimism.

3. Man, a compound of body (matter) and of soul (form), puts forth activities of a higher order—knowledge and volition. Through his senses he perceives concrete objects, e.g. this oak; through his intellect he knows the abstract and universal (the oak). All our intellectual activity rests on sensory function; but through the active intellect (intellectus agens) an abstract representation of the sensible object is provided for the intellectual possibility. Hence the characteristic of the idea, its non-materiality, and on this is based the principal argument for the spirituality and immortality of the soul. Here, too, is the foundation of logic and of the theory of knowledge, the justification of our judgments and syllogisms.

Upon knowledge follows the appetitive process, sensory or intellectual according to the sort of knowledge. The will (appetitus intellectualis) in certain conditions is free, and thanks to this liberty man is the master of his destiny. Like all other beings, we have an end to attain and we are morally obliged, though not compelled, to attain it.

Natural happiness would result from the full development of our powers of knowing and loving. We should find and possess God in this world since the corporeal world is the proper object of our intelligence. But above nature is the order of grace and our supernatural happiness will consist in the direct intuition of God, the beatific vision. Here philosophy ends and theology begins.

== Late-19th-century spread ==
In the period from the publication of Aeterni Patris in 1879 until the 1920s, neo-scholasticism gradually established itself as exclusive and all-pervading.

On October 15, 1879, Leo XIII created the Pontifical Academy of St. Thomas Aquinas, and ordered the publication of the critical "Leonine Edition", of Aquinas' complete works. The pope expanded Thomist studies in the Collegium Divi Thomae de Urbe (the future Pontifical University of Saint Thomas Aquinas, Angelicum), founding its Faculty of Philosophy in 1882 and its Faculty of Canon Law in 1896.

The thought of Thomas Aquinas gained papal ascendency over all other ‘modern’ systems of thought. In particular, the Aristotelianism of Thomas preferred to the thought of Kant. Other ‘modern’ forms of thought, including ontologism, traditionalism, the dualism of Anton Günther, and the thought of Descartes, were also seen as flawed in comparison to Thomism.

The movement spread outside Italy, finding supporters in Germany, Spain, the Netherlands, Belgium, England, Switzerland, France, Hungary, the United States, Argentina, Mexico, Brazil and Australia. At Louvain in Belgium (then still a francophone university), Leo XIII in 1891 established the Institut de philosophie to teach the doctrine of Aquinas together with history and the natural sciences. It was endorsed by four Catholic Congresses: Paris (1891), Brussels (1895), Freiburg (1897), and Munich (1900).

== Early-20th-century development ==
In the early 20th century, neo-Thomism became official Catholic doctrine, and became increasingly defined in opposition to Modernism.

In July 1907, Pope Pius X issued the decree Lamentabili sane exitu, which condemned 65 Modernist propositions. Two months later, he issued the encyclical Pascendi Dominici Gregis, in which he unequivocally condemned the agnosticism, immanentism, and relativism of Modernism as the 'synthesis of all heresies'. The anti-Modernist oath of 1910 was very important; this remained in force until 1966. In 1914, Pius X issued a list of 24 philosophical propositions summarising the central tenets of neo-scholasticism to be taught in all colleges as fundamental elements of philosophy; and in 1916, these 24 propositions were confirmed as normative. These 24 propositions are:

1. Potency and act divide being: whatever exists is either pure act or composed of potency and act as primary, intrinsic principles.

2. Since act is perfection, it is limited only by a potency that is itself a capacity for perfection; where act is pure it is unique and unlimited, where finite it composes with potency.

3. God alone subsists in absolute being (pure, simple act); creatures participate being and are composed of essence and existence as really distinct principles.

4. “Being” is said analogically of God and creatures (neither univocally nor entirely equivocally).

5. The existence (esse) is the act of a thing’s essence and is the perfection by which essence is actualized.

6. The distinction between essence and existence is real in creatures (not merely conceptual).

7. The first principles of metaphysics and of being are known by natural reason and are the basis for other sciences.

8. The world is caused by God; created being depends on a first cause for its origin.

9. Prime matter and substantial form are principles of the substance: neither has existence by itself, nor are they placed in a category except by reduction as substantial principles.

10. Extension (quantity) follows corporeal nature but is distinct from substance; substance is, in itself, indivisible and different from quantity.

11. Matter under quantity is the principle of individuation (numerical distinction).

12. The composition of body from matter and form explains the unity and plurality of corporeal substances.

13. The human soul is a subsistent, substantial form of the body (a spiritual soul, not a corporeal principle).

14. The intellective soul is immaterial and capable of understanding universal intelligibles.

15. The human soul is the forma corporis — the soul is the principle of life and of the organized unity of the body.

16. The powers of the soul (sensitive and intellectual) are real faculties ordered to their proper acts; intellectual operations are not purely material operations.

17. The vegetative, sensitive, and intellectual operations differ by principle and object; the rational soul has operations proper to its nature.

18. The senses and imagination are distinct powers with distinct objects and modes of operation.

19. The intellect apprehends the forms of things immaterially (by abstraction), and intellectual knowledge is possible because the intellect is immaterial.

20. The will is a free rational appetite, distinct from the intellect though ordered to the good apprehended by the intellect.

21. Human acts proceed from the composite of soul and body and are subject to moral evaluation; grace perfects nature but does not destroy freedom.

22. God’s knowledge and will are primary causes; creatures act under divine providence though causally distinct.

23. The divine simplicity and immutability imply that God’s action and essence are identical in the highest order; God’s perfection is infinite and identical with His existence.

24. Because God is pure being and absolutely simple, the world can come into being only by creation from God; no finite created nature has creative power over being, and created causes depend on God for existence, conservation, and the very exercise of their powers (including physical premotion where applicable).

In 1917, the Church's new Code of Canon Law (Codex Iuris Canonici) insisted that the doctrine, methods, and principles of Thomas should be used in teaching philosophy and theology. Thomist thought therefore became the basis of the manuals and textbooks in Catholic colleges and seminaries before Vatican II, and was promoted also to the laity.

== Variation within the tradition ==
Writers such as Edouard Hugon, Réginald Garrigou-Lagrange, and Henri Grenier maintained the tradition of the manuals. Others varied in their interpretation, including Martin Grabmann (1875–1949), Amato Masnovo (1880–1955), Francesco Olgiati (1886–1962), and Antonin-Dalmace Sertillanges (1863–1948). Authors such as Étienne Gilson, Jacques Maritain, and Joseph Maréchal investigated alternative interpretations of Aquinas from the 1920s until the 1950s. Gilson and Maritain in particular taught and lectured throughout Europe and North America, influencing a generation of English-speaking Catholic philosophers.

Historical investigation into Thomas's thought led some to believe that neo-Thomism did not always reflect the thought of Thomas Aquinas himself, as argued by writers such as Étienne Gilson, Marie-Dominique Chenu, and Henri de Lubac. At Vatican II, traditional neo-Thomist thought was opposed by exponents of this nouvelle théologie.

Many Thomists, however, continue in the neo-scholastic tradition. Some relatively recent proponents are treated in Battista Mondin's Metafisica di san Tommaso d'Aquino e i suoi interpreti (2002), which treats Carlo Giacon (1900–1984), Sofia Vanni Rovighi (1908–1990), Cornelio Fabro (1911–1995), Carlo Giacon (1900–1984), Tomáš Týn (1950–1990), Abelardo Lobato (1925–2012), Leo Elders (1926–2019), and Enrico Berti (1935–2022), among others. Due to its suspicion of attempts to harmonise Aquinas with non-Thomistic categories and assumptions, neo-scholastic Thomism has sometimes been called strict observance Thomism.

Anglophone theologians such as Edward Feser, Ralph McInerny, Brian Davies have defended a contemporary revival of traditional neo-scholastic Thomistic metaphysics in response to modern philosophy.

== See also ==
- Mortimer J. Adler
- Anthony Kenny
- Analytical thomism
