= Lafarre =

Lafarre may refer to the following places in France:

- Lafarre, Ardèche, a commune in the Ardèche département
- Lafarre, Haute-Loire, a commune in the Haute-Loire département
