= Martin Golding =

American philosopher (1930–2020)

- Born: March 30, 1930
- Died: October 10, 2020 (aged 90)

Education
- Education: Columbia University (PhD)

Philosophical work
- Era: 21st-century philosophy
- Region: Western philosophy
- Institutions: Duke University
- Main interests: philosophy of law

Martin Philip Golding (March 30, 1930 – October 10, 2020) was an American philosopher and professor emeritus of Philosophy at Duke University. He is known for his works on philosophy of law. Anthony J. Lisska describes him as "possibly one of the first American analytic philosophers to take natural law theory seriously." Born in New York City on March 30, 1930, Golding died on October 10, 2020, at the age of 90.

== Books ==
- Philosophy of Law (1975)
- Legal Reasoning (1984)
- Free Speech on Campus (2000)
- Legal Reasoning, Legal Theory and Rights (2007)

=== Edited ===
- The Nature of Law (1966)
- Jewish Law and Legal Theory (1994)
- Blackwell Guide to the Philosophy of Law and Legal Theory (2005)
