= John F. X. Knasas =

American philosopher (born 1948)

John Francis Xavier Knasas (born 1948) is an American philosopher. He is a leading existential Thomist in the neo-Thomist movement, best known for engaging such thinkers as Bernard Lonergan, Alasdair MacIntyre and Jeremy Wilkins in disputes over human cognition to affirm a Thomistic epistemology of direct realism and defending the thought of Jacques Maritain, Étienne Gilson and Fr. Joseph Owens. He holds the Bishop Wendelin J. Nold Endowed Chair as Professor of Philosophy at the Center for Thomistic Studies at the University of St. Thomas in Houston and earned his doctorate at the University of Toronto, under the direction of Fr. Joseph Owens.

== Bibliography ==
- Jacques Maritain: The Man and His Metaphysics [1989]
- The Preface to Thomistic Metaphysics [1991]
- Thomistic Paper VI (Editor) [1994]
- Being and Some Twentieth Century Thomists [2003]
- Aquinas and the Cry of Rachel: Thomistic Reflections on the Problem of Evil (Washington DC: Catholic University of America Press, 2013).
- Thomistic existentialism and cosmological reasoning. Washington, D.C.: Catholic University of America. 2019.
