= Joseph Owens (Redemptorist) =

Canadian philosopher and Catholic priest (1908–2005)

The Reverend Joseph Owens CSsR FRSC
- Born: April 17, 1908
- Died: October 30, 2005 (aged 97)

Education
- Education: Pontifical Institute of Mediaeval Studies (PhD, 1951)

Philosophical work
- Era: 20th-century philosophy
- Region: Western philosophy
- School: Existential Thomism
- Institutions: Pontifical Institute of Mediaeval Studies
- Main interests: Medieval philosophy, metaphysics, epistemology, ethics, rationalism

Joseph Owens CSsR FRSC (April 17, 1908 – October 30, 2005) was a Canadian Catholic priest and a philosopher specializing in the thought of Aristotle, Thomas Aquinas, and medieval philosophy.

== Life and career ==
Owens was born in Saint John, New Brunswick and was ordained in 1933.

He received his PhD in 1951 from the Pontifical Institute of Mediaeval Studies, an affiliate of the University of Toronto. He remained at the institute as a teacher and distinguished researcher for the next 40 years. He authored nine books and almost 150 academic papers.

He was a Fellow of the Royal Society of Canada and served as president of the Metaphysical Society of America (1972), the Canadian Philosophical Association, the Society for Ancient Greek Philosophy, and the American Catholic Philosophical Association. The ACPA also awarded him its Aquinas Medal.

== Bibliography ==
- Owens, Joseph (1951). The Doctrine of Being in the Aristotelian Metaphysics: A Study in the Greek Background of Mediaeval Thought. Toronto: Pontifical Institute of Mediaeval Studies. 461 pages.
  - 2nd edition, revised. Toronto: Pontifical Institute of Mediaeval Studies. 1963. 535 pages.
  - 3rd edition, revised. Toronto: Pontifical Institute of Mediaeval Studies. 1978. 539 pages.
- St. Thomas and the future of metaphysics. Milwaukee, WI: Marquette University Press. 1957. 97 pages.
- A history of ancient Western philosophy. New York: Appleton-Century-Crofts. 1959. 434 pages.
- An elementary Christian metaphysics. Milwaukee: Bruce Publishing. 1963. 384 pages.

- (reissued). Houston, TX: Center for Thomistic Studies, University of St. Thomas. 1985. 384 pages. ISBN 0-268-00916-3 (paper).

- The wisdom and ideas of Saint Thomas Aquinas. edited by Eugene Freeman and Joseph Owens. Greenwich, CT: Fawcett Publications. 1968. 158 pages.
- An interpretation of existence. Milwaukee: Bruce Publishing. 1968. 153 pages.
  - (reissued). Houston, TX: Center for Thomistic Studies, University of St. Thomas. 1985. 153 pages. ISBN 0-268-01157-5 (paper).
- Human destiny: Some problems for Catholic philosophy. Washington, DC: Catholic University of America Press. 1985. 117 pages. ISBN 0-8132-0604-9 (cloth), ISBN 0-8132-0605-7 (paper).
- Towards a Christian philosophy. Washington, DC: Catholic University of America Press. 1990. 332 pages. ISBN 0-8132-0708-8.
- Cognition: an epistemological inquiry. Houston, TX: Center for Thomistic Studies, University of St. Thomas. 1992. ISBN 978-0-268-00791-1. 373 pages. ISBN 0-268-00791-8.

=== Collected papers ===
- St. Thomas Aquinas on the existence of God: Collected papers of Joseph Owens. edited by John R. Catan. Albany: State University of New York Press. 1980. 291 pages. ISBN 0-87395-401-7.
- Aristotle, the collected papers of Joseph Owens. edited by John R. Catan. Albany: State University of New York Press. 1981. 264 pages. ISBN 0-87395-534-X (cloth), ISBN 0-87395-535-8 (paper).
- Some philosophical issues in moral matters: The collected ethical writings of Joseph Owens. edited by Dennis J. Billy and Terence Kennedy. Rome: Editiones Academiae Alphonsianae. 1996. 500 pages. ISBN 0-920980-68-6 (cloth).
- Aristotle's gradations of Being in Metaphysics E-Z. edited by Lloyd P. Gerson. South Bend, IN: St. Augustine’s Press (published 2007). 1987. ISBN 978-1587310287. 256 pages. ISBN 1-58731-028-7 (cloth).

== See also ==
- John F. X. Knasas
- Anton Charles Pegis
