= Giovanni Ventimiglia =

Swiss–Italian philosopher (born 1964)

Giovanni Ventimiglia (complete family name Ventimiglia di Geraci) is a Swiss–Italian philosopher. He is a full Professor of Philosophy at the University of Lucerne (Switzerland) and Visiting Professor for Medieval Philosophy at the University of Zurich (Switzerland). He is the director of the Centre for Theology and Philosophy of Religions at the University of Luzern and of the Master's Programme Philosophy, Theology and Religions at the University of Luzern. He is a permanent member of the Evaluation Body of the Swiss National Science Foundation (SNSF). Between 2017 and 2022, he was Visiting Professor of Medieval Philosophy at the University of Italian Switzerland. He is (founding) President of the Reginaldus Foundation, Switzerland. He was visiting scholar at King's College London and at Oxford University.

From 2004 to 2016 he was full professor of Theoretical Philosophy at the Faculty of Theology, Lugano, where he founded the Institute for Philosophical Studies (ISFI) (formerly the Istituto di Filosofia applicata) in 2003 (Director 2003-2017). In 2015, he founded the Aristotle College, of which he was Honorary President until 2020.

Giovanni Ventimiglia works primarily on Thomas Aquinas, Thomism, often at the intersection of the continental and analytical traditions of philosophy (analytical Thomism). His main interests lie in classical ontology (analogy and senses of being, God as Being, God’s names, transcendentals and medieval logic, transcendental multiplicity), and its relation to contemporary debates in analytic metaphysics. He also works on the reception of Plato's unwritten doctrines in medieval commentaries on Aristotle’s Metaphysics, the reception of Aristotle’s philosophy in medieval theology and philosophy, and the reception of Aquinas in contemporary philosophy. He has also worked on the ontology of material, digital objects and cyberspace and the relation between philosophy and psychoanalysis.

== Bibliography (selection) ==
- Aquinas After Frege, Palgrave Macmillan, London, 2020.
- Tommaso d’Aquino, La Scuola, Brescia 2014; transl. into Portuguese: São Paulo (forthcoming), transl. into Spanish: Bogotà (forthcoming);
- L’ente, l’essenza e l’esistenza. Prime nozioni di ontologia in prospettiva analitico-tomistica, Eupress-FTL, Lugano 2012;
- Distinctio realis. Ontologie aristotelico-tomistiche nella prima metà del Novecento, Eupress-FTL, Lugano 2012;
- To be o esse? La questione dell’essere nel tomismo analitico, Carocci, Roma 2012 (double-blind peer-reviewed);
- Se Dio sia uno. Essere, Trinità, inconscio, Preface by P. Coda, Editrice ETS, Pisa 2002;
- Differenza e contraddizione. Il problema dell’essere in Tommaso d’Aquino, Preface by A. Bausola, Vita e Pensiero, Milano 1997;
