= Peter Geach =

British philosopher (1916–2013)

Peter Geach FBA
- Geach in 1990
- Born: Peter Thomas Geach; 29 March 1916; Chelsea, London, England
- Died: 21 December 2013 (aged 97); Cambridge, England
- Spouse: G. E. M. Anscombe (m. 1941; died 2001)
- Children: 7

Education
- Education: Balliol College, Oxford
- Academic advisor: Ludwig Wittgenstein

Philosophical work
- Era: 20th-century philosophy
- Region: Western philosophy
- School: Analytical Thomism
- Institutions: University of Birmingham; University of Leeds
- Main interests: History of philosophy; Philosophical logic; Philosophy of religion
- Notable ideas: Cambridge change; Criticism of abstractionism; Frege–Geach problem; omnipotence paradox; substantival term

Peter Thomas Geach (Note: Pronounced /ɡiːtʃ/) (29 March 1916 – 21 December 2013) was a British philosopher who was Professor of Logic at the University of Leeds. His areas of interest were philosophical logic, ethics, history of philosophy, philosophy of religion and the theory of identity.

== Early life and education ==
Peter Geach was born in Chelsea, London, on 29 March 1916. He was the only son of George Hender Geach and his wife Eleonora Frederyka Adolfina (née Sgonina). His father, who was employed in the Indian Educational Service, would go on to work as a professor of philosophy in Lahore and later as the principal of a teacher-training college in Peshawar.

His parents' marriage was unhappy and quickly broke up. Until the age of four, he lived with his maternal grandparents, who were Polish immigrants, in Cardiff. After this time he was placed in the care of a guardian (until his father returned to Britain) and contact with his mother and her parents ceased. He attended Llandaff Cathedral School in Cardiff and, later, Clifton College.

His father, who had studied with Bertrand Russell and G. E. Moore at Cambridge, taught him philosophy starting with logic.

In 1934 Geach won a scholarship to Balliol College, Oxford, graduating BA in 1938 with first-class honours in literae humaniores, later promoted to MA.

At Oxford, Geach increasingly engaged in intellectual clashes with Catholics, through which he discovered the Catholic faith, later converting to the Roman Catholic Church. He later described it:

I was certainly cleverer than they, but they had the immeasurable advantage that they were right—an advantage that they did not throw away by resorting to the bad philosophy and apologetics then sometimes taught in Catholic schools. One day my defences quite suddenly collapsed: I knew that if I were to remain an honest man I must seek instruction in the Catholic Religion. I was received into the Catholic Church on 31 May 1938.

== Academic career ==
Geach spent a year (1938–39) as a Gladstone Research Student, based at St Deiniol's Library, Hawarden.

Geach refused to join the British Army in the Second World War and, as a conscientious objector, was employed in the war years in timber production. Though Geach himself recounts that he did later try, unsuccessfully, to join the Free Polish Army.

Following the end of the war in 1945, he undertook further research at Cambridge.

In 1951, Geach was appointed to his first substantive academic post, as assistant lecturer at the University of Birmingham, going on to become Reader in Logic. In 1966 he resigned in protest at the university's decision to create an Institute of Contemporary Culture. In his resignation letter he said he had no wish to stay at a university which "preferred Pop Art to Logic". In the same year he was appointed Professor of Logic in the Department of Philosophy at the University of Leeds. Geach retired from his Leeds chair in 1981 with the title Emeritus Professor of Logic.

At various times Geach held visiting professorships at the universities of Cornell, Chicago, Michigan, Pennsylvania, and Warsaw.

== Philosophical work ==
His early work includes the classic texts Mental Acts (1957) and Reference and Generality (1962), the latter defending an essentially modern conception of reference against medieval theories of supposition. His Catholic perspective was integral to his philosophy. He was perhaps the founder of analytical Thomism (though the current of thought running through his and Elizabeth Anscombe's work to the present day was only ostensibly so named forty years later by John Haldane), the aim of which is to synthesise Thomistic and analytic approaches. Geach was a student and an early follower of Ludwig Wittgenstein whilst at the University of Cambridge.

Geach defends the Thomistic position that human beings are essentially rational animals, each one miraculously created. He dismissed Darwinistic attempts to regard reason as inessential to humanity as "mere sophistry, laughable, or pitiable." He repudiated any capacity for language in animals as mere "association of manual signs with things or performances."

Geach dismissed both pragmatic and epistemic conceptions of truth, commending a version of the correspondence theory proposed by Thomas Aquinas. He argues that there is one reality rooted in God himself, who is the ultimate truthmaker. God, according to Geach, is truth. While they lived, he saw W. V. Quine and Arthur Prior as his allies, in that they held three truths: that there are no non-existent beings; that a proposition can occur in discourse without being there asserted; and that the sense of a term does not depend on the truth of the proposition in which it occurs. He is said to have invented the famous ethical example of the stuck potholer, when arguing against the idea that it might be right to kill an unborn child to save their mother.

In metaethics, a debate developed in the 1960s and 1970s as to whether it was possible to logically derive categorical 'ought' statements from 'is' statements. The debate famously involved Richard Hare, Max Black, Philippa Foot and John Searle among others. Geach made a notable contribution to this debate with a paper published in 1977, which purported to derive one categorical 'ought' from purely factual premises.

Geach has famously argued that the notion of absolute identity should be abandoned, to be replaced with relative identity predicates.

== Honours ==
Geach was elected a Fellow of the British Academy (FBA) in 1965. He was elected an honorary fellow of Balliol College in 1979. He was awarded the papal cross Pro Ecclesia et Pontifice by the Holy See in 1999 for his philosophical work.

== Marriage and children ==
Geach's wife and occasional collaborator was the philosopher Elizabeth Anscombe (1919 - 2001). Both converts to Catholicism, they were married at Brompton Oratory in 1941 and went on to have seven children. They co-authored the 1961 book Three Philosophers, with Anscombe contributing a section on Aristotle and Geach one each on Aquinas and Gottlob Frege. For a quarter century they were leading figures in the Philosophical Enquiry Group, an annual confluence of Catholic philosophers held at Spode House in Staffordshire that was established by Columba Ryan in 1954.

== Death ==
Peter Geach died on 21 December 2013 at Addenbrooke's Hospital in Cambridge and is buried in the same grave as his wife in (what is now) the Ascension Parish Burial Ground.

== Works ==
- Geach, Peter; Black, Max, eds. (1952). Translations from the philosophical writings of Gottlob Frege (1st ed.). Oxford: Basil Blackwell. 2nd ed. (1960), 3rd ed. (1980)
- Descartes: Philosophical Writings (with G.E.M. Anscombe) (1954) Introduction by Alexandre Koyre
- "Good and Evil," Analysis (1956), Reprinted in Foot, Philippa (ed.) Theories of Ethics (1967). United States: Oxford University Press. pp. 64–73.
- Mental Acts: Their Content and Their Objects, 1957/1997
- Three Philosophers: Aristotle; Aquinas; Frege (with G.E.M. Anscombe), 1961
- Reference and Generality: An Examination of Some Medieval and Modern Theories, 1962
- "Ascriptivism." Philosophical Review 69 (2):221-225, 1960, reprinted in Richard Rorty (ed.) The Linguistic Turn (1967)
- '"PLATO'S EUTHYPHRO": An Analysis and Commentary', The Monist Vol. 50, No. 3, July 1966
- "Some Problems about Time" Proceedings of the British Academy 51, 1965 ,1966
- History of the Corruptions of Logic, inaugural lecture, University of Leeds, 1968
- "Form and Existence" In: Kenny, A. (eds) Aquinas. Modern Studies in Philosophy. Palgrave Macmillan, London. doi:10.1007/978-1-349-15356-5_3 (1969)
- "Nominalism" In: Kenny, A. (eds) Aquinas. Modern Studies in Philosophy. Palgrave Macmillan, London. doi:10.1007/978-1-349-15356-5_6 (1969)
- God and the Soul, 1969/2001
- "A Program for Syntax" (1970). Synthèse 22:3-17. reprinted in: Davidson & Harman (edc.) Semantics of natural language (1972)
- Logic Matters, 1972
- Reason and Argument, 1976
- "Saying and Showing in Frege and Wittgenstein," Acta Philosophica Fennica 28 (1976): 54–70
- Providence and Evil: The Stanton Lectures 1971-2, 1977
- The Virtues: The Stanton Lectures 1973-4, 1977
- Truth, Love, and Immortality: An Introduction to McTaggart's Philosophy, 1979
- "Truth and God," Proceedings of the Aristotelian Society, Supplementary Volume LVI, 1982, republished in Proceedings Virtual Issue No. 1, 2013
- (edited) Wittgenstein's Lectures on Philosophical Psychology, 1946–47: Notes by P.T. Geach, K.J. Shah, and A.C. Jackson, 1989
- "Whatever Happened to Deontic Logic" Philosophia 11, 1–12 (1982), reprinted in Logic and Ethics (edited by Geach with Jacek Holowka), 1990
- Truth and Hope: The Furst Franz Josef und Furstin Gina Lectures Delivered at the International Academy of Philosophy in the Principality of Liechtenstein, 1998 2001 (ISBN 0-268-04215-2)

For more complete publication details see Lewis (1991).

=== Commemorative Publications ===
- Gormally, Luke, ed. (1994). Moral Truth and Moral Tradition: Essays in Honour of Peter Geach and Elizabeth Anscombe. Dublin: Four Courts Press.
- Lewis, Harry A., ed. (1991). Peter Geach: Philosophical Encounters. Dordrecht. ISBN 978-94-015-7885-1 doi:10.1007/978-94-015-7885-1

== See also ==
- Omnipotence paradox § Types of omnipotence

== Notes ==
Academic offices
| Preceded by H. H. Price | Howison Lecturer in Philosophy; 1963 | Succeeded by G. E. M. Anscombe |
