= Edward Feser =

American professor of philosophy (born 1968)

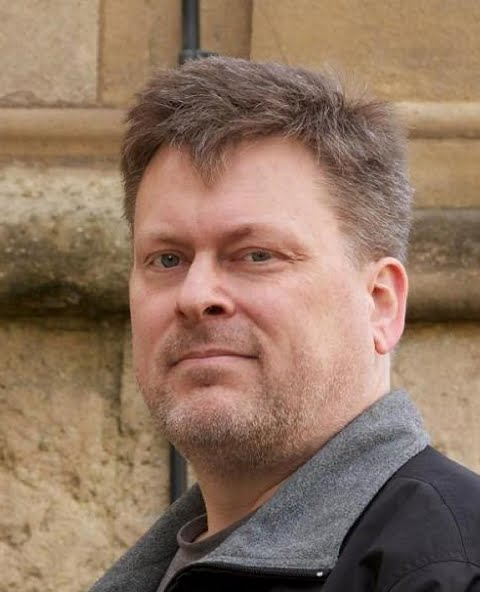
- Born: Edward Charles Feser; 1968 (age 57–58)

Education
- Education: California State University, Fullerton (BA, 1992); Claremont Graduate University (MA, 1995); University of California, Santa Barbara (PhD, 1999)

Philosophical work
- Era: Contemporary philosophy
- Region: Western philosophy
- School: Analytic philosophy; Thomism; Neo-scholasticism
- Institutions: Loyola Marymount University; Pasadena City College
- Main interests: Metaphysics; Ethics; Natural theology; Philosophy of mind; Political philosophy
- Notable ideas: Contemporary defense of Thomistic dualism

Edward Charles Feser (/ˈfeɪzər/; born 1968) is an American Catholic philosopher. He is a professor of Philosophy at Pasadena City College in Pasadena, California.

== Early life and education ==
Edward Charles Feser holds a B.A. in philosophy and religious studies from the California State University at Fullerton, an M.A. in religion from the Claremont Graduate School, and a Ph.D. in philosophy from the University of California at Santa Barbara. His 1999 thesis is titled Russell, Hayek, and the Mind-Body Problem.

== Career ==
Feser is a professor of philosophy at Pasadena City College and has been a visiting assistant professor of philosophy at Loyola Marymount University and a visiting scholar at Bowling Green State University's Social Philosophy and Policy Center.

Called by National Review "one of the best contemporary writers on philosophy", Feser is the author of On Nozick; Philosophy of Mind; Locke; The Last Superstition: A Refutation of the New Atheism; Aquinas; Scholastic Metaphysics: A Contemporary Introduction; Neo-Scholastic Essays; and Five Proofs of the Existence of God; the co-author of By Man Shall His Blood Be Shed: A Catholic Defense of Capital Punishment; and the editor of The Cambridge Companion to Hayek and Aristotle on Method and Metaphysics. His primary academic research interests are in metaphysics, natural theology, the philosophy of mind, and moral and political philosophy.

Feser writes on politics and culture from a conservative point of view and on religion from a traditionalist Catholic perspective. His work has appeared in The American, The American Conservative, Catholic World Report, City Journal, The Claremont Review of Books, Crisis, First Things, Liberty, National Review, New Oxford Review, Nova et Vetera, Public Discourse, Reason, and TCS Daily.

Feser has defended Thomistic dualism. His book The Last Superstition: A Refutation of the New Atheism argues for the classical Aristotelian-Thomistic worldview over materialist assumptions, which Feser sees as scientistic prejudices. It is critical of contemporary atheists, particularly Richard Dawkins.

== Reception ==
In a review of Five Proofs for the Existence of God for the National Catholic Register, Clare Walker wrote that Feser "has a rare gift: the ability to make esoteric philosophical arguments accessible to lay readers."

== Personal life ==
Feser lives with his wife and six children in Los Angeles, California.

== Bibliography ==
- On Nozick (Thomson-Wadsworth, 2003) ISBN 0-534-25233-8
- The Cambridge Companion to Hayek (Cambridge University Press, 2006) ISBN 0-521-84977-2
- Philosophy of Mind (A Beginner's Guide) (Oneworld Publications, 2007) ISBN 978-1-85168-478-6
- Locke (Oneworld Publications, 2007) ISBN 978-1-85168-489-2
- The Last Superstition: A Refutation of the New Atheism (St. Augustine's Press, 2008) ISBN 978-1-58731-452-0
- Aquinas (A Beginner's Guide) (Oneworld Publications, 2009) ISBN 978-1-85168-690-2
- Aristotle on Method and Metaphysics (as editor and contributor) (Palgrave Macmillan, 2013) ISBN 978-0-230-36091-4
- Scholastic Metaphysics: A Contemporary Introduction (Editiones Scholasticae, 2014) ISBN 978-3-86838-544-1
- Neo-Scholastic Essays (St. Augustine's Press, 2015) ISBN 978-1-58731-558-9
- By Man Shall His Blood Be Shed: A Catholic Defense of the Death Penalty (with Joseph M. Bessette) (Ignatius Press, 2017) ISBN 978-1-62164-126-1
- Five Proofs of the Existence of God (Ignatius Press, 2017) ISBN 978-1-62164-133-9
- Aristotle's Revenge: The Metaphysical Foundations of Physical and Biological Science (Editiones Scholasticae, 2019) ISBN 978-3-86838-200-6
- All One in Christ: A Catholic Critique of Racism and Critical Race Theory (Ignatius Press, 2022) ISBN 978-1-62164-580-1
- Immortal Souls: A Treatise on Human Nature (Editiones Scholasticae, 2024) ISBN 978-3-86838-605-9
