= Cornelio Fabro =

Italian Catholic priest and philosopher (1911–1995)

Cornelio Fabro CSS (Flumignano, Udine, 24 August 1911 – Rome, 4 May 1995) was an Italian Catholic priest of the Stigmatine Order and a scholastic Thomist philosopher. He was the founder of the Institute for Higher Studies on Unbelief, Religion and Cultures.

Known for his prodigious philosophical production, Fabro was part of the scholastic revival of Thomism. One of his major contributions to twentieth-century philosophy was to draw attention to the notion of "participation" in Thomas Aquinas' metaphysics.

Fabro was also very interested in modern philosophy, particularly the relationship of Søren Kierkegaard's thought to Christian philosophy, the origins and nature of anthropocentrism in modern thought, and the critical analysis of "progressive" theology.

== Early life ==
Fabro was born at Flumignano, Udine, in Northern Italy on 24 August 1911 to Angelo and Anna Zanello. He was the third of four children including two older brothers Antonio and Secondo, and a younger sister Alma Teresina.

Until his fifth year, he suffered from a motor disease that prevented him from speaking though he was able to communicate via signs. He also suffered from anorexia and cried continuously. A local Capuchin Fr. Guardiano suggested visiting the "Santuario della Madonna delle Grazie" in Udine, after which he was cured.

During the World War he contracted typhus but was cured by a military medical doctor. In the summer of 1915 he was operated on for Mastoiditis at the hospital of Udine where he remained until spring 1916. Consequently, his early schooling was received at the hands of his older brother.

In 1922 he transferred to the "Scuola Apostolica Bertoni" of the Congregation of the Sacred Stigmata, better known as the Stigmatines, continued his schooling in grammar schools of the Order and graduated from Scipione Maffei Junior High school.

On 1 November 1927 he entered the novitiate of the Stigmatines in Verona.

He was ordained a Catholic priest on 20 April 1935 at St. John Lateran Basilica.

== Education ==
In 1928 Fabro completed his pre-seminary studies and began studies of philosophy at the "Scuola Apostolica". After completing private studies at the Marian sanctuary at Ortonovo La Spezia in 1929 he transferred to the Curia Generalizia and International College of the Stigmatine Order at the convent of Sant'Agata dei Goti on via Mazzarino in Rome in order to begin his philosophy studies at the "Collegio Sant’Apolinare", the future Pontifical Lateran University. In 1931, he completed his doctorate receiving the highest marks with a thesis entitled L’oggettività del principio di causa e la critica di D. Hume (The Objectivity of the Principle of Causality and Criticism of D. Hume). This dissertation repeats the traditional criticism of Hume taught in the early 20th century. Fabro began studying for a Licentiate in theology at the Pontifical International Institute Angelicum, the forerunner of the Pontifical University of St. Thomas Aquinas, Angelicum On 20 December 1934 he received a prize from the Pontifical Academy of St. Thomas Aquinas for his monograph entitled Il principio di causalità, origine psicologica, formulazione filosofica, valore necessario ed universale (The Principle of Causality, its Psychological Origin, Philosophical Formulazation, and Necessary and Universal Value).

On 8 September 1934 Fabro was transferred to his Order's religious house at the Church of Santa Croce in Via Flaminia where he was assigned as church organist; he was to remain at Santa Croce until his death. Fabro resumed his studies in philosophy and theology at the Pontificium Institutum Internationale Angelicum, the future Pontifical University of Saint Thomas Aquinas, Angelicum. On 7 July 1935 he obtained a licentiate in theology from the Angelicum.

For the period of summer-fall 1935 Fabro was on scholarship at the Stazione Zoologica of Naples. In 1935-1936 he taught cosmology and psychology in Verona and studied natural science at the University of Padova.

In 1936-1937 Fabro continued his study of theology at the Angelicum and received a doctorate on 28 October 1937 with a dissertation on the metaphysical notion of participation according to Saint Thomas Aquinas entitled La nozione metafisica di partecipazione secondo S. Tommaso d'Aquino. Fabro published this dissertation as a book in 1939 with "Vita e Pensiero" of Milano.

During the period 1936 to 1940 Fabro also taught biology, rational psychology, and metaphysics at the Pontifical Lateran University.

== Career ==
Upon completing his licentiate studies in philosophy and theology, Fabro began his teaching career, which was to last more than 40 years.

In 1935, he taught his first courses at the Bertoni Apostolic School in Verona.

From 1938 to 1940, he was ordinary university professor at Pontifical Urbaniana University, where he was first Extraordinary (1939) and then ordinary professor (1941) of Metaphysics. He later taught Philosophy of Religion (1948–1956; 1970–1973). In 1960, he founded the first Institute of the History of Atheism, which was later renamed Research Institute on Non-Belief and Culture.

In 1948, he taught Theoretical Philosophy in the University of Rome.

In 1949, he began teaching at Maria SS. Assunta (also known as LUMSA) and was the director of the institute from 1954 to 1956.

Fabro was invited in 1954 as a visiting professor to give the Chaire Card. Mercier lectures at the University of Louvain on "Participation and Causality". These were published in 1960 in Italian and in 1961 in French.

Fabro was the chair of Theoretical Philosophy at the University of Naples Federico II in 1954.

From 1956 to 1958, Fabro was professor of philosophy at the Faculty of Education and History of Philosophy at the Faculty of Letters at the Catholic University of the Sacred Heart in Milan.

Upon his return from Milan, Fabro resumed teaching at Maria SS. Assunta until 1965, when he began to teach at the University of Perugia.

In 1965, Fabro taught at the University of Notre Dame in the United States as a visiting professor.

While continuing to live and teach in Rome, Fabro simultaneously taught at the University of Perugia. In 1965, he was named ordinary professor in philosophy. He was the head of the Faculty of Education from 1965 to 1967 and ordinary professor in Theoretical Philosophy from 1968 to 1981.

== Thomistic metaphysics ==
Fabro's contributions to twentieth-century Thomistic metaphysics are many. According to Fabro, being is first grasped by the intellect in an apprehension and not by means of an abstraction or a judgment. He distinguishes between being-in-act (esse in actu) and being as act (esse ut actus). The former is able to be said of accidents, the substance, principles of being, etc., while the latter is reserved for the actuating principle of being (ens).

With regard to the notion of participation, Fabro discerns a distinction between predicamental participation (characterized by univocal predication) and transcendental participation (characterized by analogical predication). According to Fabro, participation has both a structural dimension and a dynamic-causal dimension.

Fabro calls his approach to Aquinas's metaphysics and thought "essential Thomism" or "intensive Thomism." It differs from the classical or traditional approach, exemplified by authors like Thomas de Vio Cajetan and Reginald Garrigou-Lagrange, and from the transcendental approach, exemplified by authors like Joseph Marechal, Karl Rahner, and Emerich Coreth. While the classical approach tends to view being (ens) as a subsistent essence to which existence is added and the transcendental approach tends to view being (ens) as a finite limitation of the infinite horizon of being, Fabro's intensive approach sees being (ens) as a participated act of being limited and specified by a correlative essence.

== The Metaphysical Notion of Participation (1939) ==
Fabro's The Metaphysical Notion of Participation (1939) is divided into three parts. Part One explores the Platonic and Aristotelian sources in Aquinas's notion of participation. Part Two expounds the distinction between predicamental participation and transcendental participation. Part Three argues for the real distinction between essence and being in finite creatures and outlines the distinction between natural and supernatural participation.

== Neo-Thomism and Suarezism (1941) ==
Fabro's Neo-Thomism and Suarezism is a spirited defense of Thomas Aquinas's position on the real distinction between essence and the act of being in creatures. Fabro wrote a series of four articles from 1939 to 1941 on the real distinction and two of them from the journal Divus Thomas (Piacenza) were published as a book in 1941. The articles were part of a response to Pedro Descoqs, S.J., who claimed in a 1938 article that Aquinas never taught that there was a real distinction between essence and existence.

== Participation and Causality (1960) ==
Fabro's second major volume on participation focuses on the dynamic-causal dimension of participation. On the one hand, he explores causality as predicamental participation, the meaning of the principle "form gives being" (forma dat esse), and how form is a principle of being. He concludes that "form is the predicamental mediator between God and the existing finite being." On the other, Fabro presents Aquinas's account of the creation of being in terms of causal transcendental participation. "Causal transcendental participation is the production of the common esse of all creatures by creation (De pot. 3.5 ad 1-2; De ver. 21.5 ad 5-6). Esse is the proper effect of divine causality ... and it is in virtue of this direct production of esse that God works immediately on every created cause."

== Writings ==
His works were written in Italian. Here is an English translation of the titles of some of his Italian works.

- The Metaphysical Notion of Participation according to St. Thomas Aquinas, Edizioni Scientifiche Italiane, Turin, 1939
- Neo-Thomism and Suarezism, Divus Thomas, Piacenza, 1941
- Perception and Thought, Vita e Pensiero, Milan, 1941
- The Phenomenology of Perception, Vita e Pensiero, Milan, 1941
- Introduction to Existentialism, Vita e Pensiero, Milan, 1943
- Problems of Existentialism, A.V.E., Rome, 1945
- Between Kierkegaard and Marx: For a Definition of Existence, Vallecchi, Florence, 1952
- The Absolute in Existentialism, Miano, Catania, 1953
- God: Introduction to the Theological Problem, Studium, Rome, 1953
- The Soul, Studium, Rome, 1955
- From Being to Existence, Morcelliana, Brescia, 1957
- Brief introduction to Thomism, Desclée, Rome, 1960
- Participation and Causality according to St. Thomas Aquinas, Edizioni Scientifiche Italiane, Turin, 1960;
- Introduction to Modern Atheism, Studium, Rome, 1964 (English translation: God in Exile: Modern Atheism: A Study of the Internal Dynamics of Modern Atheism, From its Roots in the Cartesian cogito to the Present, Newman Press, Westminster MD, 1968)
- Man and the Risk of God, Studium, Rome, 1967
- Thomistic Exegesis, Pontifical Lateran University, Rome, 1969
- Thomism and Modern Thought, Pontifical Lateran University, Rome, 1969
- Karl Rahner and the thomistic hermeneutic, Divus Thomas, Piacenza, 1972
- The Adventure of Progressive Theology, Rusconi, Milan, 1974
- The Anthropological Turn of Karl Rahner, Rusconi, Milan, 1974
- Ludwig Feuerbach: The Essence of Christianity, Japadre, L'Aquila, 1977
- Prayer in modern thought, Editioni di Storia e Letteratura, Rome, 1979
- The trap of historical compromise: from Togliatti to Berlinguer, Logos, Rome, 1979
- The unacceptability of historical compromise, Quadrivium, Genoa, 1980
- The alienation of the West: observations on the thought of Emanuele Severino, Quadrivium, Genoa, 1981
- Introduction to Saint Thomas, Ares, Milan, 1983
- Reflections on freedom, Maggioli, Rimini, 1983
- The Rosmini Enigma, Edizioni Scientifiche Italiane, Naples, 1988
- Proofs of the Existence of God, La Scuola, Brescia, 1989
- The Odyssey of Nihilism, Guida, Naples, 1990
- For a Project of Christian Philosophy, D'Auria, Naples, 1990

Some of his books and articles have been published in English.

- God in Exile. Modern Atheism (translation of Introduzione all'Ateismo moderno), Newman Press, New York 1968; Studium, Roma 1969(2).
- Selected Articles of Metaphysics and Participation (a collection of nine articles originally published by Fabro in English), IVE Press, Chillum, MD 2016.
- God: An Introduction to Problems in Theology (translation of Dio. Introduzione al problema teologico), IVE Press, Chillum, MD 2017.
- Profiles of the Saints (originally published in Italian as Profili de Santi, 1957), IVE Press, Chillum, MD 2019.

== Biography ==
- Fontana, Elvio (2016), Introduction to Cornelio Fabro, translated by Dreyer, Nathaniel, IVE Press, ISBN 9781939018564
- Russo, A. (2014) "Franz Brentano and Cornelio Fabro: A Forgotten Chapter of the Brentanian Reception", in Axiomathes 24(1):157-165.
- Russo, A., Cornelio Fabro e Franz Brentano: una comune difesa del realismo gnoseologico aristotelico, in Edizioni Scientifiche Italiane, 2012, pp. 135--147;
- Russo, A., ed,, Cornelio Fabro e Franz Brentano. Per un nuovo realismo, Studium, Roma 2014.
