= Tomáš Týn =

Czech philosopher and Catholic priest (1950–1990)

Servant of God Tomáš Josef Maria Týn OP
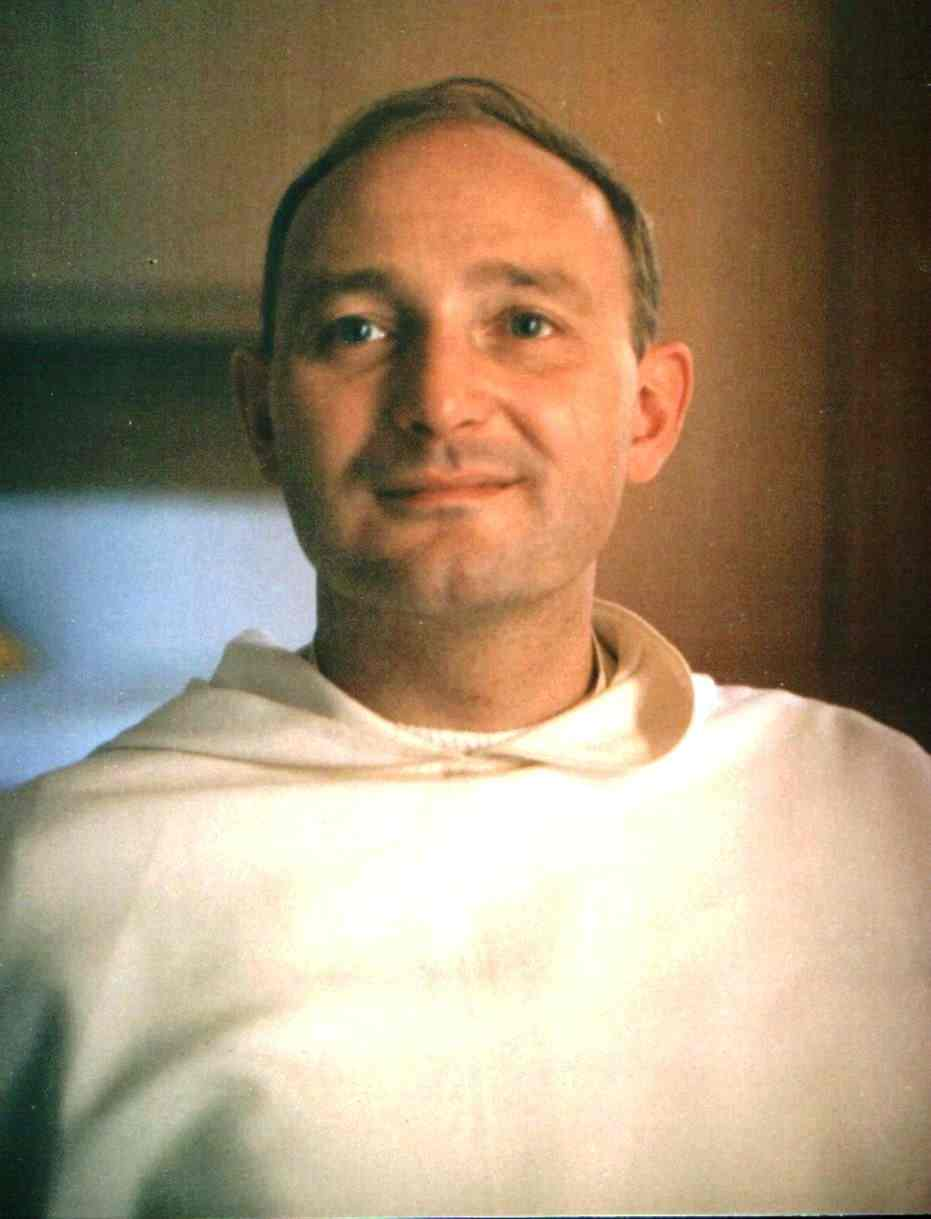
- Born: 3 May 1950; Brno, Czech Republic
- Died: 1 January 1990 (aged 39); Neckargemünd, Baden-Württemberg, Germany

Tomáš Týn OP (May 3, 1950 – January 1, 1990) was a Czech Dominican priest of the Czech Province and professor of moral theology at the University of Bologna. His beatification process was opened on 25 February, 2006 by the Archbishop of Bologna, Carlo Caffarra, in the Basilica S. Domenico dei Frati Predicatori.

== Biography ==
Tomáš Týn was a Dominican theologian born in Brno, Czechoslovakia on 3 May 1950, where he was brought up as a Catholic. He was allowed to study in France, and later moved to Germany to begin his novitiate with the Dominicans on 28 September 1969 in Warburg in Westphalia, where his family came to escape the dictatorship in their country. He studied philosophy and theology at the studio Domenicano of Bologna, and was awarded a doctorate in theology from the Pontifical University of Saint Thomas Aquinas, Angelicum in 1978 with a dissertation entitled L'azione divina e la libertà umana nel processo della giustificazione secondo la dottrina di s. Tommaso d'Aquino.

On 29 June 1975 he was ordained priest by Pope Paul VI. He often spoke out against communism, and said this opposition he felt for dictatorship had been the reason for his vocation to the priesthood, as he would later say in a homily on Fátima in 1987: "My vocation is due to Communism, thanks be to God".

In 1987 he began teaching Moral Theology at the Dominican "Studium" in Bologna, where he had been sent after his ordination to the priesthood.

He was in epistolary correspondence with the then Cardinal Ratzinger, Prefect of the Congregation for the Doctrine of the Faith, who would later become Pope Benedict XVI. His first letter was written on 4 August 1985, feast of St. Dominic. Tomáš Týn wrote to Cardinal Ratzinger to pay him a compliment for his book The Ratzinger Report and to discuss the problems faced by the Church.

Týn died on 1 January 1990 in Heidelberg, Germany, close to his family. His tombstone bears the words from Psalm 42 recited at the feet of the altar in the Latin Mass: Et introibo ad altare Dei, ad Deum qui laetificat juventutem meam.

The cause for his canonisation was initiated in 1991 by Carlo Caffarra, Cardinal Archbishop of Bologna.

== Theology ==
Theologically speaking, Týn specialised in the effects of sanctifying grace, free will, and the rediscovery of traditional Catholicism, which he defended by saying that “if we have no love for tradition, we cannot call ourselves Catholics”.

As a proponent of Neo-Scholastic Thomism Týn was sometimes accused of being too "traditionalist" and against progressive theology. His biographer, Giovanni Cavalcoli OP, has defined him as a "post-conciliar traditionalist", saying that although he was firmly against progressive thought, he did not belong to the reactionary movement to which the term "traditionalist" is often applied.

== Books ==
- Metafisica della sostanza. Partecipazione e analogia entis, published by the Studio Domenicano in Bologna, 1991
- L'azione divina e la libertà umana nel processo della giustificazione secondo la dottrina di S. Tommaso d'Aquino: (a comparison between action by God and the effects of free will in the sanctification of the human soul), 1979
- La beata sempre Vergine Maria Madre di Dio: omelie mariane, a series of Marian homilies published by the Associazione Figli Spirituali di Padre Tomáš Týn in 2004
