= Anthony J. Lisska =

Anthony J. Lisska was an American professor of philosophy at Denison University. He was a specialist in Thomism and analytic philosophy and the thinking of St. Thomas Aquinas. He described his "intellectual avocation" as regional history and wrote several books on the history of Ohio. In 2016, the Denison University Gilpatrick Center was rededicated as the Lisska Center for Scholarly Engagement in honor of Anthony Lisska and his contributions to the university. These contributions include serving as dean, chairing the philosophy department, and founding and chairing the Honors Program.

Lisska earned a Bachelor of Arts from Providence College, a master’s from Saint Stephen's College, and a doctorate from Ohio State University.

Lisska died on September 18, 2022, at 84 years of age.

== Selected publications ==
- Philosophy matters. Charles Merrill, 1978.
- Aquinas’s theory of perception: An analytic reconstruction. Oxford University Press, Oxford, 1996.
- Aquinas’s theory of natural law: An analytic reconstruction. Oxford University Press, Oxford, 1996.
- A history of Aquinas College High School
- An illustrated history of the Buckeye Lake Yacht Club. 2007.

== See also ==
- Henry Babcock Veatch
