= Édouard Hugon =

French Dominican philosopher and theologian (1867–1929)

The Reverend Édouard Hugon OP
- Born: 25 August 1867, Lafarre, Haute-Loire, France
- Died: 7 February 1929 Rome, Italy

Philosophical work
- Era: 20th-century philosophy
- Region: Western philosophy
- School: Thomism
- Institutions: Pontifical Academy of Saint Thomas Aquinas
- Main interests: Christian theology, metaphysics
- Notable works: 24 Thomistic Theses

Édouard Hugon, OP (25 August 1867 – 7 February 1929) was a French Dominican priest, Thomistic philosopher and theologian. He was from 1909 to 1929 a professor at what became the Angelicum, as well as a well-known author of philosophical and theological manuals within the school of traditional Thomism.

== Early biography ==
Florentin-Louis Hugon was born on 25 August 1867 in Lafarre (Loire), France, a small mountain village in the Diocese of Puy-en-Velay. His parents Florentin and Philomène Hugon were pious country folk. They had 13 children of which Florentin-Louis was the oldest.

== Formation ==
Hugon was educated first by his mother, then in the local school where he gained a reputation as a bright and pious student. He was invited to attend the Domenicana school at Poitiers in February 1882 where he was an outstanding student. Hugon showed a special interest in Ancient Greek, especially the writings of Homer whose Iliad he had partially committed to memory, thus gaining for himself among his classmates the nickname "Homer's grandson".

At eighteen years of age, having finished secondary school, he entered the Dominican Order in Rijckholt (nearby Maastricht, Holland), where the Studium of the Province of Lyons was taking refuge due to the persecutions and expulsions imposed by antagonistic members of the government. The following year he received the Dominican habit under the name Brother Édouard. In 1898 during a trip to the United States, being inexplicably detained by his Prior, he narrowly escaped the sinking of the passenger steamship La Bourgogne of the Compagnie Generale on which he was scheduled to sail, and on which nearly 600 people drowned.

He made his solemn profession on 13 January 1890 and was ordained priest on 24 September 1892.

== Career ==
Hugon began his lifelong teaching career immediately after ordination. He successively taught in Rijckholt, at Rosary Hill (New York), in Poitiers (France), in Angers (France), again at Rijckholt, and finally at the Angelicum (Rome) from 1909 to 1929. He died in Rome in the latter year.

Hugon was a member of the Pontifical Academy of St. Thomas Aquinas. On 21 March 1918 Pope Benedict XV appointed him as Consultant for the Sacred Congregation for the Oriental Church (now known as the Congregation for the Oriental Churches). In 1925 Pope Pius XI asked Hugon to work on the encyclical Quas primas on the kingship of Christ.

He was instrumental in the causes to proclaim Saint Efrem and Saint Peter Canisius Doctors of the Church, and had a determining role in the canonization of Saint Joan of Arc. Hugon was a principal collaborator of Cardinal Pietro Gasparri, the Cardinal Secretary of State, in publishing his famous Catechism.

== Piety ==
Rising each day at 4:30 Hugon celebrated Mass at 5:00 and spent the morning teaching and researching. In the afternoon he practiced the Via Crucis and prayed the Rosary, and began his afternoon teaching and ecclesiastical commitments including a vigorous schedule of spiritual retreats.

== Influence ==
Perhaps Hugon's most important and influential work as a writer is his contribution, along with that of the Jesuit philosopher theologian Guido Mattiussi, to the ecclesiastical document known as The 24 Thomistic Theses that was issued by the Sacred Congregation of Studies under the authority of Pope Pius X in 1914. This document is the official pronouncement of the Catholic Church on which philosophical positions constitute Thomism, and constitutes the culmination of the Church's effort "to recover the real teaching of Aquinas, purifying it from distorting traditions, one-sidedness, and lack of historical perspective." His monumental Cursus philosophiae thomisticae outlines an interpretation of St. Thomas derived from John of St Thomas.

The great Thomist philosopher and theologian Réginald Garrigou-Lagrange, Hugon's colleague at the Angelicum compared Hugon to Saint Thomas Aquinas saying that: "Students, philosophers and theologians will for a long time have recourse to the Latin and French works of Hugon strongly approved by three Popes...and they will frequently consult his works considering him the theologus communis (common theologian), the faithful echo of the Doctor Communis Ecclesiae."

== Works ==
Contribution to the ecclesiastical document known as The 24 Thomistic Theses.

Among Hugon's personal works, some of the best-known are:

- Les XXIV theses thomistes (The 24 Thomistic Theses), a work which explains the ecclesiastical document.
- Cursus philosophiae thomisticae, 4 vols. ("Thomistic Philosophy Course," based on the thought of St Thomas Aquinas as interpreted by John of St Thomas). (Ia: Logica; Ia-IIae: Philosophia Naturalis: Cosmologia; IIa-IIae: Philosophia Naturalis: Biologia et Psychologia; IIIa: Metaphysica.)
- Tractatus dogmatici, 3 vols. ("Dogmatic Treatises," a course on theology organized as a commentary on Aquinas' Summa Theologiae). (Ia: De Deo Uno et Trino, De Deo Creatore et Gubernatore, De angelis et de homine; IIa: De peccato originali et de gratia, De Verbo Incarnato et Redemptore, De Beata Virgine Maria Deipara; IIIa: De Sacramentis in communi et in speciali ac de Novissimis.)
- Hors de l'Église, point de salut ("Outside of the Church there is No Salvation," his Thomistic solution to the theological problem of salvation and membership in the Catholic Church).
- La causalite instrumentale dans l'ordre surnaturel ("Instrumental Causality in the Supernatural Order").
