= Jeffrey Brower =

American philosopher

Education
- Education: University of Iowa (PhD), University of Colorado, Boulder (BA)

Philosophical work
- Era: 21st-century philosophy
- Region: Western philosophy
- Institutions: Purdue University
- Main interests: Medieval Philosophy, Metaphysics, Philosophy of Religion

Jeffrey E. Brower is an American philosopher and Professor of Philosophy at Purdue University. He is known for his works on medieval philosophy.

== Books ==
- Aquinas's Ontology of the Material World: Change, Hylomorphism, and Material Objects, Oxford University Press, 2014, ISBN 9780198714293.
- Michael Bergmann and Jeffrey E. Brower (eds.), Reason and Faith: Themes from Richard Swinburne, Oxford University Press, 2016, ISBN 9780198732648.
- Jeffrey Brower and Kevin Guilfoy (eds.), The Cambridge Companion to Abelard, Cambridge University Press, 2004, ISBN 0521775965
