= John Haldane (philosopher) =

Scottish philosopher (born 1954)

John Joseph Haldane
- Born: 19 February 1954 (age 72)

Philosophical work
- Era: 20th-century philosophy
- Region: Western philosophy
- School: Analytical Thomism
- Main interests: Philosophy of mind, ethics, history of philosophy
- Notable ideas: Coining the term "analytical Thomism"

John Joseph Haldane KCHS FRSE FRSA (born 19 February 1954) is a Scottish philosopher, commentator and broadcaster. He is a former papal adviser to the Vatican. He is credited with coining the term 'analytical Thomism' and is himself a Thomist in the analytic tradition. Haldane is associated with The Veritas Forum and is the current chair of the Royal Institute of Philosophy.

Haldane is Vice President of the Catholic Union of Great Britain.

== Education ==
Haldane attended Hamilton Park School, John Ogilvie Hall Preparatory School and St Aloysius' College, Glasgow. Later he studied at the Kent Institute of Art & Design (now the University for the Creative Arts) in Rochester, Kent, and the Wimbledon School of Art (now Wimbledon College of Arts, University of the Arts London) for a BA in fine art in 1975.

He received a BA in philosophy from Birkbeck College of the University of London in 1980; a PGCE from the London University Institute of Education in 1976; and a PhD in philosophy from Birkbeck College in 1984. He holds honorary degrees from Saint Anselm College, New Hampshire, United States, from the University of Glasgow, Scotland, and from University of Notre Dame Australia. He was named one of Scotland's "Brights" in a list of the 50 top Scottish intellectuals, artists, lawyers, scientists, etc. (Herald Magazine, 2001).

== Family ==
Haldane spent his childhood in Glasgow, and subsequently studied in Rochester and London. In 1980 he was married to his wife Hilda at Westminster Cathedral. They have four children; Kirsty (b. 1988), James (b. 1990), Alice (b. 1992) and John (b. 1994).

== Career ==
He has been a visiting lecturer in the School of Architecture of the University of Westminster, at the Medical School of the University of Dundee, at the University of Malta, at the Thomistic Institute at the University of Notre Dame, at the University of Aberdeen, at Denison University, at the University of St. Thomas, at The John Paul II Catholic University of Lublin, and the Institute for the Psychological Sciences. He held the Royden Davis Chair of Humanities at Georgetown University, and delivered the Gifford Lectures at the University of Aberdeen in 2003–04, and the Joseph Lectures at the Gregorian University in Rome.

He was appointed to the University of St Andrews in 1983 where he held a lectureship and a readership. He was subsequently University Professor in Philosophy from 1994 to 2015. From 1988 to 2000 and from 2002 to the present he has been Director of the University Centre for Ethics, Philosophy and Public Affairs. In addition, he has held fellowships at the University of Pittsburgh, University of Edinburgh, St John's College, Oxford, Social Philosophy and Policy Center, Bowling Green State University and at the Centre for the Study of Sculpture in Leeds, West Yorkshire. Since 2015, he has held the J. Newton Rayzor Sr. Distinguished Chair in Philosophy at Baylor University.

== Cultural and artistic interests ==
Haldane has simultaneously pursued a career in the cultural sphere. He is a regular contributor to renowned publications including The Burlington Magazine, Modern Painters, Tate and Art Monthly.

== Television work ==
The majority of Haldane's television work is for the BBC, including The Big Questions on nuclear armament. He has contributed to a number of programmes including The Heart of the Matter: God Under the Microscope, Newsnight, and Twenty Four Hours. He has also produced work for ITV and PBS.

== Newspapers ==
In addition to his former position as a regularly contributing columnist, Haldane has offered opinions and contributed articles to periodicals including The Times, Daily Telegraph, The Scotsman, New Statesman, The Herald, Sunday Herald, Mail on Sunday, Daily Mail, Daily Express, Contemporary Review and Economist Information Strategy.

== Radio broadcasts ==
Haldane's radio work includes contributions to the following stations:

- BBC Radio Three: Nightwaves, The Brains Trust, Concert Intermission Talks
- BBC Radio Four: Afternoon Shift, In Our Time, Moral Maze, Today Programme, Start the Week, and Sunday Programme.
- BBC Radio Scotland: Benchmark, Colin Bell Programme, Colin McKay Programme, Good Morning Scotland, Personal Touch, Realms of Engagement, Speaking Out, Thought for the Day, The Usual Suspects and Values Added.
- BBC World Service: Agenda, Matter for Debate, Newsround, and The World Today.
- ABC (Australia): Late Night Live, and National Breakfast Programme
- USA Public Service Radio

== Fellowships ==
- Royal Society of Arts, London (Fellow, 1995).
- Royal Society of Edinburgh, (Fellow, 1995).
- St Anselm College, NH (Hon. LLD, 1997).
- University of Glasgow, (Hon. D.Litt., 2008).
- The Witherspoon Institute, Princeton, New Jersey (Senior Fellow).
- KHS: Ordo Equestris Sancti Sepulchri Hierosolymitani

== Publications and others ==
- J.J.C. Smart (1996). Atheism and Theism. Blackwell. Listed by Blackwell in its 'Tomorrow's Classics' leaflet.
- An Intelligent Person's Guide to Religion. London: Duckworth. 2003.
- Faithful Reason. London: Routledge. 2004.
- Seeking Meaning and Making Sense. Exeter: ImprintAcademic. 2008.
- Church and World. Leominster: Gracewing. 2008.
- Practical Philosophy. Exeter: ImprintAcademic. 2009.
- Reasonable Faith. London: Routledge. 2010.

=== Co-edited works ===
- Roger Squires and Leslie Stevenson, ed. (1986). Mind, Causation and Action. Oxford: Blackwell.
- Philosophy, Conservation and the Environment. St Andrews: CPPA. 1989.
- Roger Scruton, ed. (1990). Logical Necessity and Other Essays. London: Aristotelian Society.
- Haldane, E. (1991). James Frederick Ferrier. Bristol: Thoemmes.
- Crispin Wright, ed. (1993). Reality, Representation and Projection. New York: Oxford University Press.
- "Philosophers and Philosophies". Special Issue of The Philosophical Quarterly. 1993.
- "Analytical Thomism". The Monist (1). 1997.
- Routledge Encyclopedia of Philosophy. London: Routledge. 1998.
- Modern Painters in Scotland. Modern Painters. 1999.
- Philosophy and Public Affairs. Cambridge: Cambridge University Press. 2000. ISBN 9780521667845.
- "Thomas Reid Special". American Catholic Philosophical Quarterly (1?). 2000.
- Demarco: Philosophy and Art. Kingston: Kingston University. 2000.
- Haldane, John (2002). Mind, Metaphysics and Value in the Thomistic and Analytical Traditions. Notre Dame, IN: UNDP.
- Stephen Read, ed. (2002). The Philosophy of Thomas Reid. Oxford: Blackwell.
- David Carr, ed. (2003). Spirituality, Philosophy and Education. London: RoutledgeFalmer.
- Modern Writings on Thomism. Bristol: Thoemmes/Continuum. 2003.
- Values, Education and the Human World. Exeter: Imprint Academic. 2004.
- W. Aiken, ed. (2004). Philosophy and its Public Role. Exeter: Imprint Academic.
- "Hume on Mind and Causality". Journal of Scottish Philosophy (?1). 2007.
- Haldane, John (2007). "Scottish Philosophy". The Monist. 90 (2): 147–153. doi:10.5840/monist20079029.
