= Lafarre, Haute-Loire =

Lafarre
- Commune
- Location of Lafarre
- Location within France Location within Auvergne-Rhône-Alpes
- Coordinates: 44°50′35″N 3°59′26″E
- Country: France
- Region: Auvergne-Rhône-Alpes
- Department: Haute-Loire
- Arrondissement: Le Puy-en-Velay
- Canton: Velay volcanique

Government
  - Mayor (2020–2026): Philippe Cathonnet
- Area^{1}: 13.02 km^{2} (5.03 sq mi)
- Elevation: 962 m (3,156 ft)
- Highest elevation: 1,192 m (3,911 ft)
- Lowest elevation: 823 m (2,700 ft)
- Population (2023): 86
  - Density: 6.6/km^{2} (17/sq mi)
- Time zone: UTC+01:00 (CET)
  - Summer (DST): UTC+02:00 (CEST)
- INSEE/Postal code: 43109 /43490
- ^{1} French Land Register data, which excludes lakes, ponds, glaciers > 1 km^{2} (0.386 sq mi or 247 acres) and river estuaries.

Lafarre (French pronunciation: [lafaʁ]; Occitan: La Fara) is a commune in the Haute-Loire department in south-central France.

== Population ==
Historical population
Year	Pop.	±% p.a.
1968	137	—
1975	106	−3.60%
1982	102	−0.55%
1990	83	−2.54%
1999	72	−1.57%
2007	69	−0.53%
2012	63	−1.80%
2017	72	+2.71%
2023	86	+3.01%
Source: INSEE

== See also ==
- Communes of the Haute-Loire department
