= Joseph Kleutgen =

German philosopher and theologian

Joseph (or Josef) Wilhelm Karl Kleutgen (9 April 1811 – 13 January 1883) was a German Jesuit theologian and philosopher. He was a member of the Society of Jesus, and contributed significantly to the establishment of Neo-scholasticism.

== Life ==
Kleutgen was born in Dortmund, Westphalia. He began his studies with the intention of becoming a priest, but owing to the Protestant atmosphere of the school which he attended, his zeal for religion gradually cooled. From 28 April 1830, to 8 January 1831, he studied philology at the Ludwig-Maximilians-Universität München. He was intensely interested in Plato's philosophy and the Greek tragic poets. As member of the fraternity Germania, he came under prosecution after political revolts in Munich that were inspired by the July Revolution in France. He fled to Jena. In this state he was about to enter upon a secular career, but in Easter 1832 he entered the theological academy of Münster, indicating a decisive turn in his convictions. During the preceding years he had imbibed certain ideas from Lessing's and Herder's writings, which he could not reconcile with the Christian faith. After several weeks of internal conflict he betook himself to prayer, and to his astonishment many of his difficulties vanished at once; the remainder disappeared gradually. After two terms at Münster he went to the seminary at Paderborn, where he was ordained subdeacon on 22 February 1834. With the Prussian police attempting to arrest him due to his involvement in the 1830 revolts and also in order to evade military service, he went to Switzerland. On 28 April he entered the Society of Jesus at Brig, Switzerland, and, to avoid any trouble with the Prussian Government, he became a naturalized citizen in one of the Swiss cantons, and changed his name to "Peters". After his ordination to the priesthood in 1837 he was professor of ethics in Fribourg, Switzerland, for two years; he then taught rhetoric in Brig from 1840 till 1843. In 1843, he was appointed professor of rhetoric at the German College, Rome.

In the political unrest of the 1848/49 Revolution in Rome, Jesuits were in danger, so Kleutgen alias Peters lived undercover.

== Career ==
During his residence in Rome and the vicinity (1843–74), besides pastoral work and the composition of his principal writings, he was the substitute to the secretary of the Superior General of the Jesuits (1843–56), John-Philip Roothaan, secretary (1856–62), consultor of the Congregation of the Index, and collaborator in the preparation of the Constitution De fide Catholica of the First Vatican Council. He composed the first draft of the encyclical Aeterni Patris of Pope Leo XIII on Scholasticism (1879). He played a leading part in the revival of Scholastic philosophy and theology.

With the object of combating the doctrines of Georg Hermes, J. B. Hirscher, and Anton Günther, he composed his Theologie der Vorzeit (Theology of the Past) and Philosophie der Vorzeit (Philosophy of the Past), works which upon their appearance were pronounced in many quarters to be epoch-making.

== Convent of Sant'Ambrogio ==
In 1856, Kleutgen alias Peters became confessor extraordinary to the Franciscan Convent of St. Ambrose in Rome. The nuns of this convent honoured as a saint their founding abbess, Agnese Firrao (died 1854), although this had been forbidden by the Holy Office in 1816, which had convicted the abbess of "false sanctity", or pretending to be a saint.

In 1858, the widowed Princess Katharina of Hohenlohe-Waldenburg-Schillingsfürst moved to Rome with the intention of becoming a nun. Her spiritual director, Cardinal Karl-August von Reisach, recommended that she join the Franciscan monastery of Sant’Ambrogio. Hohenzollern, having recently joined the convent as a novice, denounced its activities to an inquisition, accusing mistress of novices Maria Luisa, among others, of sexual transgressions, heretical practices and homicidal schemes. Maria Luisa claimed to receive messages from St. Mary, was performing rituals usually allowed only for priests, and slept with several of the novices. Other transgressions included affairs between the women and priests. When she challenged convent practices, Katharina became the victim of an attempted poisoning.

As the investigation proceeded it emerged that Peters alias Kleutgen who as the "spiritual father" of the nuns had been entitled to hear confession in the convent and administer the sacrament of Penance had entered into sexual relations with Maria Luisa, whom he regarded as a saintly person given to visions and divine revelations. He had had knowledge of the poisoning of Katharina, although the degree to which he had instigated the attempted murder could not be ascertained. He was convicted as an heretic for his fostering of the cult of Agnese Firrao and sentenced to three years of house arrest. However Pope Pius IX reduced the sentence to two years, which Kleutgen spent outside Rome at the shrine of Our Lady in Galloro, where he continued to work on his magnum opus, Theologie der Vorzeit and Philosophie der Vorzeit.

== Later life ==
Later in his life Kleutgen was instrumental in the drafting of the dogma of papal infallibility. Pope Pius IX found him useful because he was one of the most ardent proponents of papal infallibility. After the opening of the first Vatican council, at the urgent request of several bishops, especially Archbishop Steins, Apostolic Vicar of Calcutta, his Superior General, then Peter Beckx, recalled him to Rome to place his talents and learning at the disposal of the council, and Pope Pius IX removed all ecclesiastical censures. Gustav Adolf, Cardinal Prince of Hohenlohe-Schillingsfürst, Katharina of Hohenlohe's relative and a theological adversary of Kleutgen, had not succeeded in using the Sant'Ambrogio scandal to block Kleutgen's rise. After the end of the Papal States in 1870, he lived in exile until a new pope, Pope Leo XIII, called Kleutgen back to Rome, where he helped draft the encyclical Aeterni Patris.

In 1879 some Old Catholics who had split from the Catholic Church on the issue of papal infallibility spread the report that Kleutgen had been condemned by the Roman Inquisition to an imprisonment of six years on account of complicity in the poisoning of the Princess von Hohenlohe; but, on 7 March, Juvenal Pelami, Notary of the Inquisition, testified that Kleutgen had never been summoned before the Inquisition upon such a charge, and consequently had not been punished by it.

Although rumors had circulated, it was only in the 1970s that the first couple of files about the affair were discovered, and it wasn’t until 1998 that all the documents were found.

Kleutgen died at St. Anton near Kaltern, Tyrol.

== Works ==
Kleutgen's principal works are:

- "Die alten und die neuen Schulen" (Mainz, 1846, Münster, 1869);
- "Ueber den Glauben an das Wunderbare" (Münster, 1846);
- "Ars dicendi" (Rome, 1847; Turin, 1903);
- "Die Theologie der Vorzeit" (3 vols., Münster, 1853–60, 5 vols., 1867–74);
- "Leben frommer Diener und Dienerinnen Gottes" (Münster, 1869);
- "Die Philosophie der Vorzeit" (2 vols., Münster, 1860-3; Innsbruck, 1878), translated into French and Italian, and recently (2019) into English by William H. Marshner as "Pre-Modern Philosophy Defended";
- "Die Verurteilung des Ontologismus" (Münster, 1868); translated into French and Italian;
- "Zu meiner Rechtfertigung" (Münster, 1868);
- "Vom intellectus agens und den angeborenen Ideen";
- "Zur Lehre vom Glauben" (Münster, 1875);
- "Die Ideale und ihre wahre Verwirklichung" (Frankfurt, 1868);
- "Ueber die Wunsche, Befürhtungen und Hoffnungen in Betreff der bevorstehenden Kirchenversammlung" (Münster, 1869);
- "Briefe aus Rom" (Münster, 1869);
- "Predigten" (Regensburg, 1872; 2 vols., 1880-5);
- "Die oberste Lehrgewalt des römischen Bischofs" (Trier, 1870);
- "De ipso Deo" (Regensburg, 1881);
- "Das Evangelium des heiligen Matthäus" (Freiburg, 1882).

== Sources ==
- Hubert Wolf, The Nuns of Sant'Ambrogio. The True Story of a Convent in Scandal. New York: Alfred A. Knopf, 2015.
- Ulrich L. Lehner, "Prurient History", First Things, March 2020
