= Giovanni Maria Cornoldi =

Italian Jesuit academic, author and preacher (1822–1892)

Giovanni Maria Cornoldi (29 September 1822 – 18 January 1892) was an Italian Jesuit academic, author, and preacher.

== Life and career ==
Born at Venice, he entered the Society of Jesus in 1840 and taught philosophy at Brixen and Padua for many years.

In 1879 on the occasion of the VII centenary of Thomas Aquinas Cornoldi gave the encomium in honor of the angelic doctor at the College of St. Thomas, the future Pontifical University of Saint Thomas Aquinas, Angelicum.

From 1880 until his death he belonged to the editorial staff of the Civiltà Cattolica, at Rome and often preached at the church of the Gesù.

He died in Rome on 18 January 1892.

== Works ==
He was a follower of Thomas Aquinas, and wrote many works in explanation of his doctrine and in refutation of Rosminianism. His Lezioni di Filosofia (1872) was translated into Latin by Cardinal Agostini under the title Institutiones Philosophicæ ad mentem divi Thomæ; Aquinatis.

In addition to his purely philosophical writings he published a commentary on the Divina Commedia of Dante, illustrated from philosophy and theology. He founded academies in honour of Thomas at Bologna and at Rome and established two periodicals, La Scienza Italiana and the journal of the Accademia di S. Tommaso.
