= Thomistic theology of merit =

Theological discipline

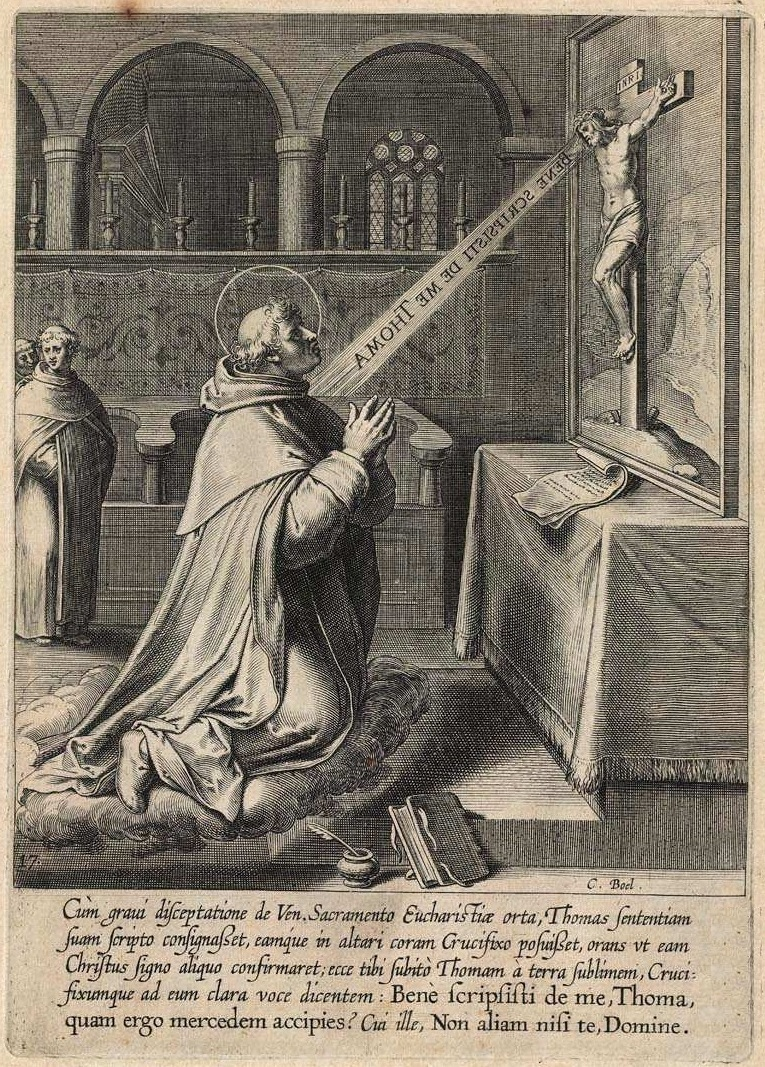
Bene scripsisti de me, Thoma ("You have written well about me, Thomas"), at the Vita D. Thomae Aquinatis by Otto van Veen (c. 1610).

Thomistic theology of merit is the set of beliefs developed by Thomistic thinkers regarding merit in Christianity.

Thomas Aquinas discussed merit extensively in his early Commentary on the Sentences and in his mature Summa Theologica. In both texts, Aquinas views human life as a "journey" which starts with the conversion from sin to grace and ends in the beatific vision, a process marked by the good actions which make the soul closer to God and hold the divine approval. Acknowledging the difficulties of affirming the possibility of human merit before a divine entity, Thomism develops thoroughly on the concept in order to defend the Catholic position.

== Congruous and condign merit ==
In the Summa Theologica, Aquinas develops on merit as part of his teachings on grace and categorizes it as "an effect of cooperating grace". The Doctor distinguishes merit from rewards, as the latter is something bestowed by reason of the former. Merit seems to be a "function of justice", which as such would depend on an equality between both agents. This approach appears problematic considering that humans are not equal to God and therefore cannot demand nor make claims on the latter. Therefore, Aquinas characterizes merit as part of the "divine ordination", by which God desires to bring all things to their ends according to the divine will and therefore is not "our debtor simply but His own, inasmuch as it is right that His will should be carried out". For this to be possible, God gives men the necessary grace to be able to carry out what would be impossible by nature.

Merit can be subdivided between condign and congruous merit. Condign merit is that which is "the right in strict justice to a reward", while congruous merit is "based on what is fitting in a given situation". Taking merit as proceeding from human free will, Aquinas concludes that men by themselves can only merit congruously. However, as grace allows Christians to participate in the divine nature as adopted sons of God, they can merit condignly by the meritorious works performed through the action of the Holy Spirit in them.

Aquinas does not make recourse to this in his Commentary on the Sentences. The fact that humans are able to merit before God is firstly defended by using the Aristotelian categorization of justice: as merit is to be understood as pertaining to distributive and not to commutative justice, the objection regarding an inequality between God and men is dismissed. Secondly, merit is taken to be possible as part of the divine covenant or promise. As God has freely decided to render a reward for human merit, meritorious acts cannot be said to establish a debt because such debt has been self-imposed by God. His free decision to promise such an answer annuls the possibility of human debt, and only implies being faithful to what has already been affirmed. As later championed in the Summa, the divine ordination implies that "God has ordained that what human beings do, despite its intrinsic inferiority, will nevertheless be treated as deserving of eternal life".

== Merits of Christ ==
Chromolithography of Christ Child holding the Globus Cruciger and surrounded by biblical events (c. 1919)

The role of the merits of Jesus Christ is crucial in the Thomistic theology of merit. Thomas "not only holds that Christ could merit but also that he merited from the first moment of his human existence". The merits of Jesus hold a preeminent position in the salvation process, standing above satisfaction, sacrifice and redemption.

As condign merit is a personal title, however, the question regarding how Christ can merit salvation for mankind is risen. Aquinas explains this process through the believer's incorporation into the Church as the Mystical Body of Christ, in which the merits of Jesus are communicated to human beings. Salvation is therefore described as a "mystical union between Christ and the faithful". The merits of Christ are communicated to men when, in baptismal regeneration, they are made participants of his Body. Following Saint Porphyrius' idea by which "all men are one man in common nature", Aquinas affirms that Christ can merit for other humans "representing humanity before God and thus meriting on behalf of the whole of the human community" because of the essential conjunction (coniunctio essentialis) held with them. Human beings can only be united to each other by an accidental conjunction of affection (coniunctio affectus), but Christ as the Last Adam had joined human beings in a communio in natura. Christ's humanity is to a certain degree understood as an "instrument" of the divinity through which the whole of mankind is influenced.

As to how Christ could merit considering he had possessed the beatific vision since his conception and during his whole earthly life, as Aquinas contended, the theologian follows Peter Lombard and Gregory the Great in affirming that "one and the same reward could be merited in various ways, not in the sense that it became more due but rather in that it was made due for various reasons, so that one, as it were, obtained several titles to the same good".

== Object and reward of merit ==
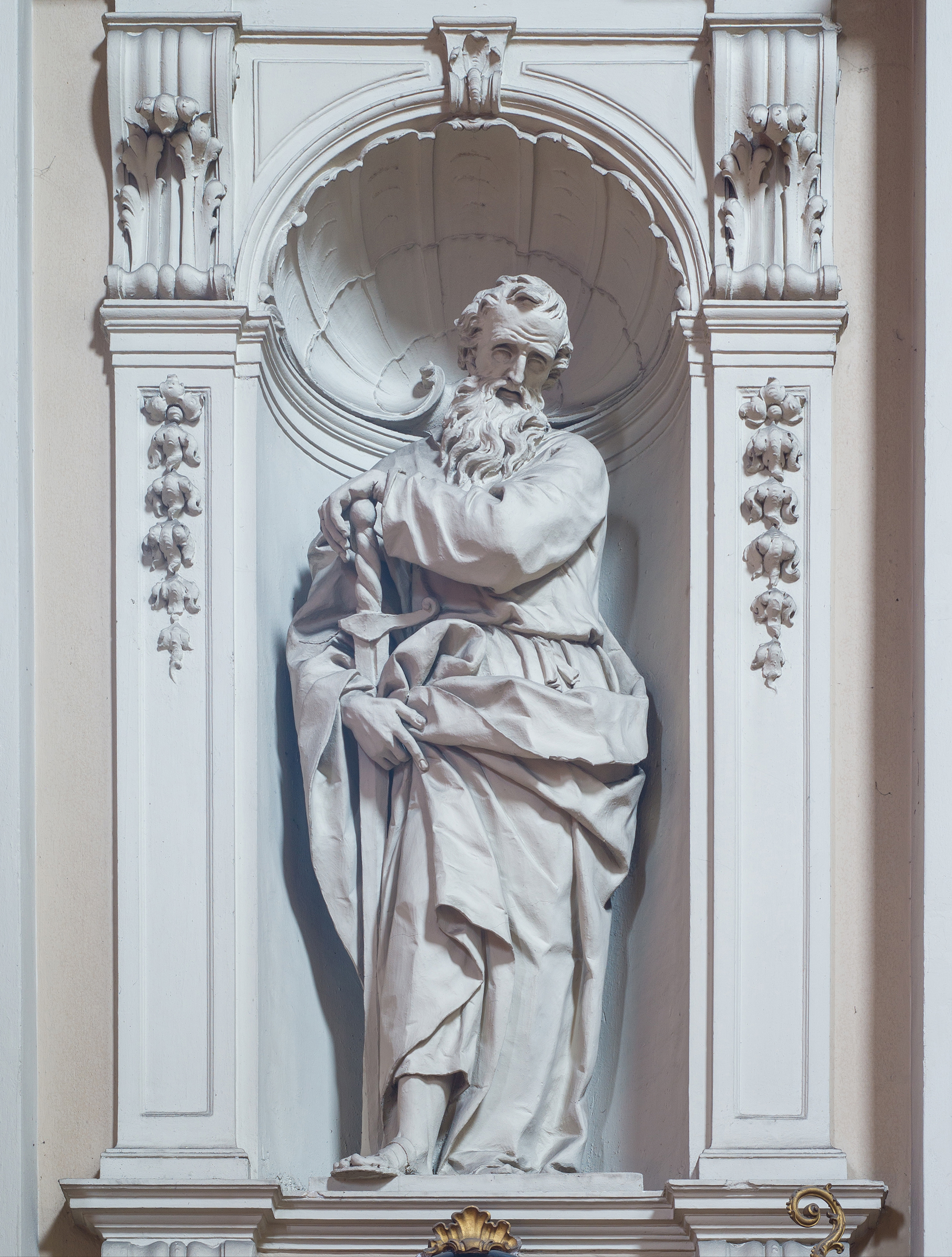
Statue of Saint Paul the Apostle at Santi Nazaro e Celso, Brescia.

When reflecting on the object of merit, Aquinas distinguishes things that can be merited from things that cannot. Both initial justification and restoration to grace after committing a mortal sin cannot be merited congruously nor condignly. Final perseverance is also part of this group. On the other hand, one can congruously merit the first grace for another and condignly merit an increase of grace and eternal life for himself. Generally speaking, the main rewards on meritorious actions can be read in the Summa and the Super Sententias as eternal life itself and the increase in "habitual grace", by which human beings may keep performing good acts. Aquinas places a particular emphasis on the object and reward of merit in his Commentary on the Sentences, in which he is not particularly concerned with which actions can be taken as meritorious and which cannot.

It is in his Commentary on Matthew that Thomas joins meritorious acts and their rewards when discussing the beatitudes. Aquinas characterizes each as composed of a meritum and a correspondent praemium, and the reception of the latter is due to Christ's promise. Therefore, in the first beatitude, poverty in spirit is the merit and the Kingdom of Heaven its reward. The Doctor develops extensively on the subject in the prologue to such chapter, in which he appeals to Aristotle's "heroic virtue" as a form of action "above the human manner". This kind of actions are performed only through grace in Catholic theology, and thefore merits are "either acts of the gifts [of the Holy Spirit], or acts of the virtues according as they are perfected by the gifts".

Merit is presented here as a form of virtuous action, performed under the impulse of the Holy Spirit. One of the reasons to perform these actions is that they are part of the new law. To Aquinas everything that is said in the Sermon on the Mount is a concrete application of the merits described in the Beatitudes: 'Just as Moses first set down the commandments, and afterwards said many things which were all referred back to the commandments given, so Christ in his teaching first sets forth these Beatitudes, to which all the other things are reduced'.

But merit means more than simply obeying the Law, as it implies acting towards the final end which is happiness. Despite happiness will only be fully attained in Heaven and therefore the promise shall not be fulfilled in a complete sense during earthly life, following the beatitudes nevertheless derives in being rewarded with a certain earthly happiness, composed, for instance, of the loosening of sins and the defeat of one's defects. Regarding the possibility of meriting the first grace for others, Aquinas states that only Christ can said to do so condignly as the head of the Church. However, one can merit the first grace for another person in a congruous sense. As put in the Summa Theologica:

It is clear that no one can merit condignly for another his first grace, save Christ alone; (…) inasmuch as He is the Head of the Church, and the Author of human salvation (...) But one may merit the first grace for another congruously; because a man in grace fulfills God’s will, and it is congruous and in harmony with friendship that God should fulfill man's desire for the salvation of another.

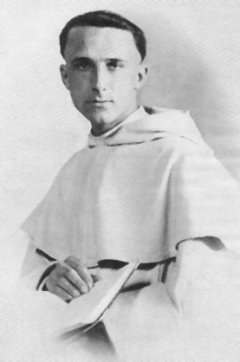
Réginald Garrigou-Lagrange, French Dominican friar and Thomist (1877–1964)

This position led later Thomists such as Réginald Garrigou-Lagrange to propose a third kind of merit, mostly associated to the Virgin Mary in her advocation as Mediatrix. As the former defined it, the merit "de congruo proprie" implies the "merit of becomingness" which "is founded on charity or friendship with God, rather than on justice". As put in The Three Ages of the Interior Life, Christ would have "satisfied for us in strict justice by His human acts which drew from His divine personality an infinite value capable of making reparation (...) Mary satisfied for us by a satisfaction based, not on strict justice, but on the rights of the infinite friendship or charity which united her to God". Saint Pius X would make a similar point at Ad diem illum, in which he affirmed that

We are then, it will be seen, very far from attributing to the Mother of God a productive power of grace–a power which belongs to God alone. Yet, since Mary carries it over all in holiness and union with Jesus Christ, and has been associated by Jesus Christ in the work of redemption, she merits for us de congruo, in the language of theologians, what Jesus Christ merits for us de condigno, and she is the supreme Minister of the distribution of graces.

Regarding the conditions for an act to be meritorious, Catholic theologians have held different positions. Duns Scotus had affirmed that the works of those justified were meritorious on account of the "divine promise" or covenant, whereas later Thomists such as Thomas Cajetan or Domingo de Soto defended that works condignly meritorious were so because of the works themselves.

The "principle of merit" in which every meritorious action must be founded is "charity founded in sanctifying habitual grace". Furthermore, two conditions must be met for meriting: namely the "facultas merendi" (capacity to merit) and the "status merentis" (state of meriting). The facultas merendi implies that a person is in control of his own acts through free choice and that divine grace is present in the action. The status merentis refers generally to earthly life, a situation in which human beings can perform meritorious actions in contrast to the heavenly beatitude in which they already possess what merit is directed to. From a Thomistic point of view, the individual must also be in a state of grace for an act to be meritorious.

== Merit and moral goodness ==
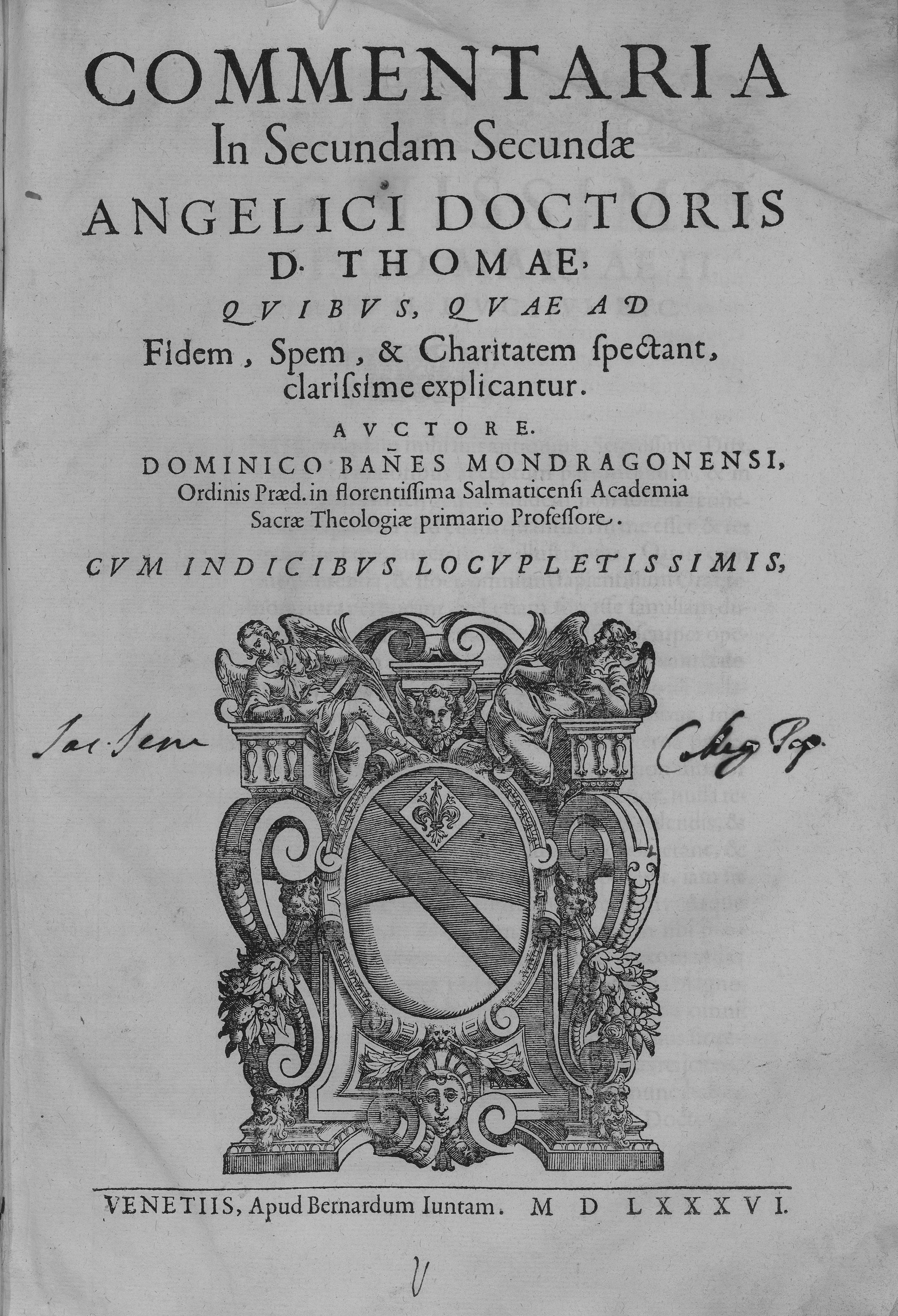
1586 front page of the commentary on the Secundam Secundae of the Summa Theologica by Domingo Báñez.

This conditions follow from the belief that only believers can perform actually meritorious acts, while unbelievers can do morally good works which are not meritorious. Some acts, namely those good works of someone who does not have Christian charity, are therefore indifferent to merit or demerit. As charity is dependent on faith, unbelievers cannot be said to hold Christian charity and therefore cannot merit eternal life in any sense through this acts according to Thomism, what differs from other assessments of invincible ignorance.

The distinction between moral goodness and merit is central to Thomistic theology of merit. As Thomism asserts that evil is the privation of a due good, a morally evil action is that which lacks the due order in a voluntary act. Moral goodness is to be measured by reason, and is said to belong to a "voluntary act in which nothing is lacking with respect to the order of reason in its object, end, and circumstances", while moral evil is the lack of something due to the act itself. Any defect in object, end and circumstances of an act diminishes its goodness, but as merit is not any of these but something superadded, the lack of merit does not impede that morally good actions may indeed be performed by unbelievers. Aquinas explains this through the following analogy: a horse can be said to be defective if it is lacking sight or legs, as both should be present in the animal, but is not defective because of lacking rationality as such a property does not naturally belong to the horse. The defect of morally good actions which do not elude merit is supernatural, not natural, and therefore does not imply a privation in the act itself (what could make it an evil deed). The disorder is to be found on the agent's lack of charity.

Thomists from the School of Salamanca traditionally argued against necessity of grace for the performance of the unbelievers' morally good acts. Francisco de Vitoria and Domingo Báñez attributed such position to John Capreolus, but there is no conclusive evidence regarding the latter's views. Báñez stated that "[w]hether he is a believer or an unbeliever, a sinner can do many morally good works without any supernatural help" and that "with only the general help of God, the author of nature, which is always presupposed, a man is able to work some good which is proportionate to rational nature". Such acts, however, cannot merit salvation in Báñez' system, "[a]nd the reason is because even congruous merit presupposes friendship, or at least excludes enmity with God himself...no aspect of congruity can be received on the side of the rational creature which is in sin, so that God could pay him a reward belonging to a supernatural order, such as is grace, which is the root of eternal life". Capreolus holds a similar position in stating that the unbelievers' good deeds are irrelevant to their salvation and have no merit.

== Merit in divine judgment ==
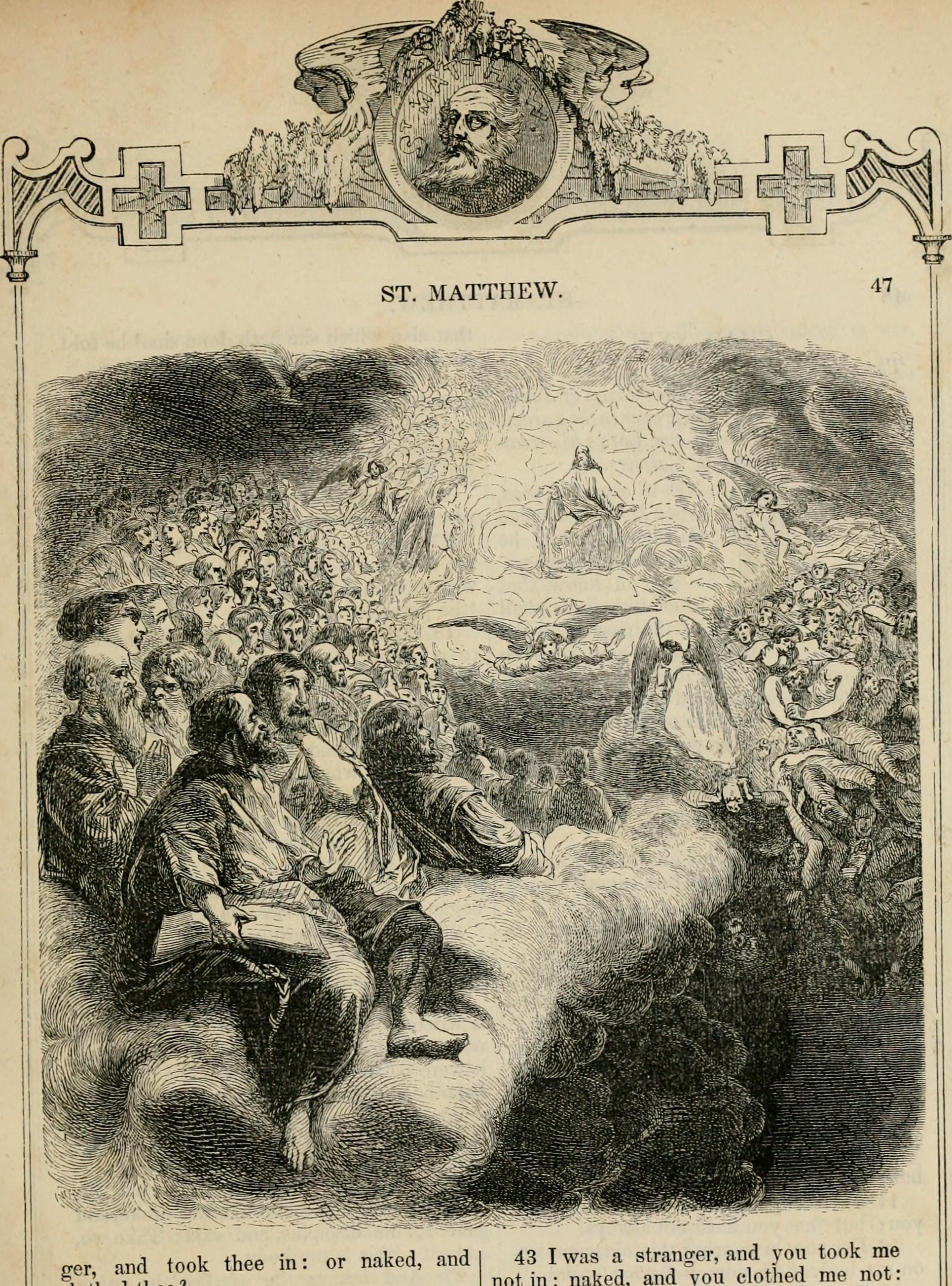
1850 engraving depicting Matthew 25 (Come, ye blessed of My Father) at an illustrated English translation of the Vulgate

The Thomistic notion of merit is crucial to such tradition's understanding of the Last Judgment and the subsequent beatific vision. As it has been already mentioned regarding Aquinas' treatment of happiness in life, the fullness of the divine promises for those who perform meritorious actions is to be found only in Heaven. Thomas develops on his views when commenting on Matthew 25:31-46.

According to Aquinas, the Last Judgment is ultimately a judgment of merits, after which the reward of eternal happiness follows from two causes: "[o]ne on God’s part, i.e., God’s blessing, another on our part, i.e., the merit which is from free will. For men should not be idle, but should cooperate with God’s grace". The consideration of human actions in the Judgment presupposes their achievement through grace, what makes God to recognize the latter's operation in a soul rather than only taking the human will into account. The Judgment functions as a "bridge" between merit and its rewards, and therefore the reward is in fact given freely despite merits are evaluated. In the Summa, Thomas follows Saint Augustine of Hippo in affirming that "He who made you without you, will not save you without you".

The meritorious act considered in itself (secundum substantiam operis) as proceeding from free choice in no longer sufficient for condignity but merely for congruity. Instead, condignity is due to the value (valor) of the power (virtus) of the Holy Spirit acting in us. This not only introduces a more explicit Trinitarian and hence Christological aspect, but it also establishes a more fitting proportion between merit and reward. Just as the end of human life is uncreated, so it is fitting that the principle by which we attain beatitude should also be uncreated, and in a similar way as Christ merited infinitely because his theandric acts were the actions of the one who is both God and man in one person, so we merit condignly because we are moved by a divine person, namely the Holy Spirit, who nevertheless influences us in such a way as not to abolish free choice and human cooperation.

The heavenly reward for condign merit is said to be of the same genus (ad idem genus) as the reward. Therefore, as condignly meritorious actions proceed from grace, their reward shall be the consummation of grace in eternal glory. In a particular sense, every virtue appears as meriting a proportionate reward: exaltation is then merited by humility, abundance by poverty, and so forth. Christian charity, which is the principle of all meritorious action, is proportionately rewarded by "seeing, loving and delighting in God". However, the proportionality axiom seems problematic due to the "maximum inequality" between God and human beings. To solve this objection, Aquinas makes use of the concept of equality of proportion. Resorting to cases in which human commutative justice is applied under an "imperfect sense" because of a relational inequality (such as that between a father and his son), Aquinas teaches that

since there is nothing that is equal to God and all things exist by participation in him, it follows that if there should be any justice and thus merit between God and creatures, it will be of a very special kind: it will be according to a certain proportion, inasmuch each operates according to his own mode (secundum modum suum), i.e. it will be based on the unique relationship that obtains between human beings and God. Now, since the mode and measure (modus et mensura) of human power (virtus) is from God, this takes us back to divine ordination, for the end of human power (virtus) is precisely that we should merit eternal life. It should also be noted that not only man but also God operates according to his own mode, which hints at the fact that the divine ordination inherent in nature is in turn based on the order found in God’s goodness, justice, mercy, and we might also add: being.

== Criticism ==
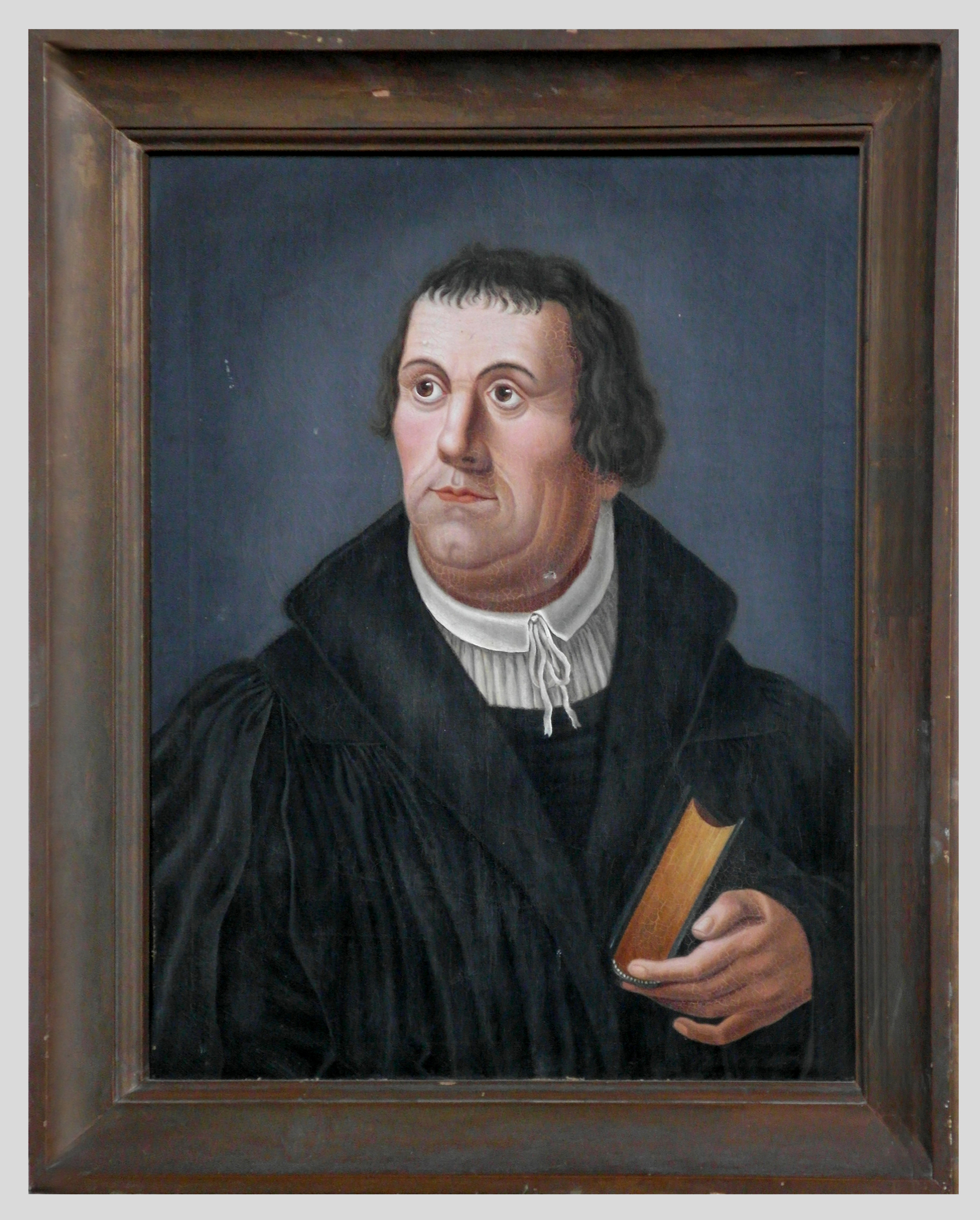
Painting of Martin Luther at Dohna, Saxony.

The Thomistic point of view was criticized by Martin Luther, who rejected the possibility of justice in condign merit. Some Lutherans kept using merit as a term, but attempted to remove any notion which implied a just treatment and reduce the concept to a form of mercy. Luther denied the doctrine formally as early as 1518 and later, in his On the Bondage of the Will, asserted that the Scholastics were "worse than the Pelagians" as the latter at least "confess and assert condign merit, simply, candidly, and ingenuously, calling a spade a spade and a fig a fig, and teaching what they really believe". In his 1535 commentary on the Epistle to the Galatians, the German preacher called merit the "theology of the antichristian kingdom" and the "tricks of Satan". Including works performed after initial justification and during the sanctification process, Luther took all human actions to be essentially sinful and affirmed that "[t]rying to merit grace is trying to placate God with sins". This aligns with his affirmation according to which "[a] good work, well done, is a venial sin according to the mercy of God, but a mortal sin according to the judgment of God".

Luther developed on his views as part of his radical opposition between the Law and the Gospel, which set both to be "not just distinct but also antithetical". According to his views, the Gospel does not "command one to do anything but invites one simply to receive the offered grace of the forgiveness of sins and eternal salvation".

== See also ==
- Affectio commodi and affectio iustitiae
- Cur Deus Homo
- Divine judgment
- Recapitulation theory of atonement
- Synergism
- Thomistic sacramental theology
- Treasury of merit
- Voluntarism (philosophy)

== Bibliography ==
- Eitenmiller, Magdalene (2018). "On the Fittingness of the Title 'Mediatrix of All Graces' as applied to the Blessed Virgin Mary" (PDF). Ecce Mater Tua: A Journal of Mariology. 1: 65–117.
- Schink, Mikael (2019). Salvation Through Christ's Merits in Saint Thomas Aquinas (Licenciate in Dogmatic Theology thesis). University of Fribourg.
- Ten Klooster, Anton M. (2020). "The Beatitudes, Merit, and the Pursuit of Happiness in the Prima Secundae: The Action of the Holy Spirit at the Heart of Moral Theology". Nova et Vetera. 18 (1): 179–200. doi:10.1353/nov.2020.0009. ISSN 2470-5861.
- Osborne, Thomas M. (2010). "Unbelief and Sin in Thomas Aquinas and the Thomistic Tradition". Nova et Vetera. 8 (3): 613–626.
- Washburn, Christian D. (2015). "The Transformative Power of Grace and Condign Merit at the Council of Trent". The Thomist: A Speculative Quarterly Review. 79 (2): 173–212. doi:10.1353/tho.2015.0010. ISSN 2473-3725.
- Wawrykow, Joseph (1992). "On the Purpose of 'Merit' in the Theology of Thomas Aquinas". Medieval Philosophy & Theology. 2: 97–116. doi:10.5840/medievalpt199226. hdl:1813/56599. ISSN 1057-0608.
