= Gregory Pine =

American Dominican friar and professor (born 1988)

The Reverend Father Gregory Pine OP
- Born: 6 June 1988; Newtown, Pennsylvania, U.S.
- Education: University of Fribourg, Franciscan University of Steubenville
- Church: Catholic Church
- Ordained: 2016 (priest)

Gregory Maria Pine OP (born June 6, 1988) is an American Dominican friar and theologian.

Pine is an assistant professor of Dogmatic and Moral theology at the Dominican House of Studies and an Assistant director of the Thomistic Institute.

== Biography ==
Born and raised in Newtown, Pennsylvania, Pine attended the Franciscan University of Steubenville and entered the Order of Preachers upon graduating.

He was ordained a priest in 2016 and holds an STL (Licentiate in Sacred Theology) from the Dominican House of Studies. He received his doctoral degree in dogmatic theology at the University of Fribourg (Switzerland). He has published articles in Nova et Vetera (English Edition), Angelicum, and The Thomist.

He is the co-author of Credo: An RCIA Program (TAN Books) and Marian Consecration with Aquinas (TAN Books) as well as the author of Prudence: Choose Confidently, Live Boldly (Our Sunday Visitor).

His articles also appears in various Catholic magazines and web sites such as Ascension’s Catholic - Classics series and Aleteia. He is a regular contributor to the podcasts Pints with Aquinas, Catholic Classics, The Thomistic Institute, and Godsplaining.
