= Joseph Augustine Di Noia =

American Catholic archbishop and theologian (born 1943)

His Excellency, The Most Reverend Joseph Augustine Di Noia OP
- Adjunct Secretary of the Congregation for the Doctrine of the Faith; Titular Archbishop of Oregon City
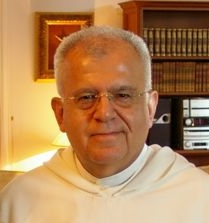
- Appointed: September 21, 2013
- Predecessor: none (new position)
- Other post: Titular Archbishop of Oregon City
- Previous posts: Vice President of the Pontifical Commission Ecclesia Dei (2012–2013); Secretary of the Congregation for Divine Worship and the Discipline of the Sacraments (2009–2012); Under-Secretary of the Congregation for the Doctrine of the Faith (2002–2009)

Orders
- Ordination: June 4, 1970 by James Burke
- Consecration: July 11, 2009 by William Levada, Donald Wuerl and Thomas C. Kelly

Personal details
- Born: July 10, 1943 (age 83) Bronx, New York, United States
- Education: Providence College; Dominican House of Studies; Yale University
- Motto: In obœdientia Veritatis (In obedience to the truth)

Styles of Joseph Di Noia
- Reference style: The Most Reverend
- Spoken style: Your Excellency
- Religious style: Your Excellency

Joseph Augustine Di Noia OP (born July 10, 1943) is an American member of the Dominican Order who is a Roman Catholic archbishop and theologian. Since 2013 he has been adjunct secretary of the Congregation for the Doctrine of the Faith. He has held several other positions in the Roman Curia since 2002.

== Early life and education ==
Born on July 10, 1943, in the New York City borough of the Bronx, Di Noia was baptized at the Capuchin-run Immaculate Conception Church on Gun Hill Road. He was raised in the Wakefield section of the Bronx.

Di Noia graduated with a Bachelor of Arts degree in philosophy from Providence College in Providence, Rhode Island, in 1965 and entered the Dominican Province of St. Joseph. He went on to study philosophy at the order's faculty for philosophical formation at St. Stephen's Priory in Dover, Massachusetts Di Noia then pursued his theological formation at the Dominican House of Studies in Washington, D.C. He earned a Master of Divinity degree and a Bachelor of Sacred Theology degree there in 1969.

== Priesthood ==
Di Noia was ordained a priest on June 4, 1970, at St. Dominic Church in Washington D.C. by Bishop James Burke. He earned a Licentiate of Sacred Theology from the House of Studies in 1971. Di Noia then returned to Providence College to teach theology and serve as assistant chaplain.

Di Noia in 1974 entered Yale University in New Haven, Connecticut. He received a Doctor of Religious Studies degree in 1980 with a dissertation entitled "Catholic Theology of Religions and Interreligious Dialogue".

== Early career ==
After completing his doctorate in 1980, Di Noia returned to the House of Studies to teach systematic theology. During his time there, he also worked as editor-in-chief of The Thomist, a Catholic academic journal. He was a founding director of the Intercultural Forum for Faith & Culture at the Saint John Paul II National Shrine in Washington.

In 1993, Di Noia was appointed as executive director of the Secretariat for Doctrine & Pastoral Practices at the United States Conference of Catholic Bishops (USCCB) in Washington. He became a member of the International Theological Commission in Rome in 1997 and received the title of Master of Sacred Theology from the Dominicans in 1998.

In 2001, Di Noia served as a visiting professor at St. Joseph's Seminary in Yonkers, New York.

== Roman Curia assignments ==
Di Noia began his career in the Roman Curia when Pope John Paul II appointed him under secretary of the Congregation for the Doctrine of the Faith in Rome on April 4, 2002.

On June 16, 2009, Pope Benedict XVI named Di Noia as secretary of the Congregation for Divine Worship and the Discipline of the Sacraments and titular archbishop of Oregon City.

On July 11, 2009, at the Basilica of the National Shrine of the Immaculate Conception in Washington, Di Noia was consecrated as archbishop. Cardinal William Levada was the principal consecrator and Archbishops Donald Wuerl and Thomas C. Kelly served as principal co–consecrators. When he was reassigned after just three years, he said he was "flabbergasted".

On June 26, 2012, Pope Benedict XVI appointed Di Noia as vice president of the Pontifical Commission Ecclesia Dei, serving under its president, Cardinal Levada. Created by John Paul II in 1988, the commission was charged with negotiating with members of the Society of Saint Pius X, which was declared as schismatic.

On September 21, 2013, Pope Francis named Di Noia as adjunct secretary of the Congregation for the Doctrine of the Faith.

== Books ==
Di Noia has authored three books and numerous articles:

- The Diversity of Religions: A Christian Perspective (Catholic University of America Press, 1992)
- The Love That Never Ends: A Key to the Catechism of the Catholic Church (Our Sunday Visitor Press, 1996).
- Grace in Season: The Riches of the Gospel in Seventy Sermons (Cluny Media, 2019). ISBN 978-1950970384

== See also ==
- List of the Catholic bishops of the United States § American bishops serving outside the United States
- List of heads of the diplomatic missions of the Holy See

Catholic Church titles
Preceded by Gianfranco Girotti	Under-Secretary of the Congregation for the Doctrine of the Faith; 2002–2009	Succeeded by Damiano Marzotto Caotorta
Preceded by Malcolm Ranjith	Secretary of the Congregation for Divine Worship and the Discipline of the Sacraments; 2009–2012	Succeeded by Arthur Roche
Preceded by Camille Perl	Vice-President of the Pontifical Commission Ecclesia Dei; 2012–2013	Vacant
New office	Adjunct Secretary of the Congregation for the Doctrine of the Faith; 2013–present	Incumbent
