= Janet E. Smith =

American classicist and philosopher (born 1950)

Janet Elizabeth Smith (born 1950) is an American classicist and philosopher, and former professor of moral theology at the Sacred Heart Major Seminary in Detroit, Michigan.

== Life ==
=== Early life and education ===
Janet Elizabeth Smith was born in 1950. Smith studied Classics at Grinnell College, earning the B.A. degree in 1972. She also received the M.A. in Classical Languages at the University of North Carolina in 1975, and a Ph.D. in Classical Languages at the University of Toronto in 1982. Her doctoral dissertation, under the supervision of Timothy Barnes, was titled "Plato's Use of Myth as a Pedagogical Device".

=== Teaching positions ===
After completing her doctorate, Smith taught philosophy for nine years at the University of Notre Dame in the program of Liberal Studies. She went on to teach philosophy for twelve years at the University of Dallas, where she received tenure.

After a visiting professorship in life issues at Sacred Heart Major Seminary in Detroit and simultaneously a visiting professorship in philosophy at Ave Maria College in Ypsilanti, Michigan, Smith was hired by Sacred Heart Major Seminary in 2001. She held the Father Michael J. McGivney Chair in Life Issues from 2016 to 2019, the year of her retirement.

=== Service ===
Smith has served agencies of the Holy See in various capacities, longest as a consultor to the Pontifical Council for the Family.

From 1989 to 1994 Smith served the Congregation for Religious and Secular Institutes as an appointed member of an investigative commission into the publications of Sr. Jeannine Gramick and Fr. Robert Nugent on pastoral care for homosexual persons.

In 2011, she was appointed to serve the Pontifical Council for Promoting Christian Unity as a member of the Anglican Roman Catholic International Commission for five years.

Smith has also served on the following institutional and corporate boards:

- Our Sunday Visitor Advisory Board
- Baylor University Medical Center Ethics Board
- Advisory Board, The Institute for Catholic Liberal Education
- Board of Advisors, Nova et Vetera English edition
- Executive Council, American Catholic Philosophical Association, 2011
- Advisory Board, Catholic Education Resource Center
- Advisory Board, Thomas International Project

== Honors ==
Smith has received two honorary degrees and several other awards for scholarship and service.

- Michael A. Haggar Fellow Award, University of Dallas
- Prolife Person of the Year, Catholic Diocese of Dallas
- 1993 John Cardinal Wright Award, Fellowship of Catholic Scholars
- Honorary doctorate in Christian ethics, Franciscan University of Steubenville
- Honorary doctorate, St. Charles Borromeo Seminary (Philadelphia)
- In 2008, Smith taught at the Saint Paul Seminary School of Divinity at the University of St. Thomas (Minnesota), as the seminary's first Scholar in Residence.
- 2008 Veritas Award, Aquinas Center for Theological Renewal, Ave Maria University

== Speaking and media appearances ==
Smith is known in Catholic circles as an expert on the encyclical Humanae vitae and on Pope John Paul II's teaching on marriage and family life ("Theology of the Body"). She is a popular public speaker about Catholic teaching on sexuality and on bioethics.

She has appeared on the Geraldo show, Fox News, CNN International, CNN Newsroom, and Al Jazeera and has appeared in many shows for various series on EWTN.

== Works ==
=== Books ===
- (Translator/editor) Humanae Vitae: A Challenge to Love (New Hope, KY: New Hope Publications, 1987), a revised translation of Pope Paul VI's encyclical Humanae Vitae
- Humanae Vitae: A Generation Later, (Washington: Catholic University of America Press, 1991) ISBN 978-0813207407
- (Editor) Why Humanae Vitae Was Right: A Reader, (San Francisco: Ignatius Press, 1993) ISBN 0-89870-433-2
- (Contributor) St. Thomas Aquinas and the Natural Law Tradition (Washington: Catholic University of America Press, 2004)
- The Right to Privacy, (San Francisco: Ignatius Press, 2008) ISBN 978-1-58617-259-6
- (Contributor) Reading John with St. Thomas Aquinas: Theological Exegesis and Speculative Theology (San Francisco: Ignatius Press, 2010)
- (Co-author with Chris Kaczor) Life Issues, Medical Choices, Questions and Answers for Catholics (Cincinnati, Servant Books, 2010)
- (Contributor) Bioethics with Liberty and Justice: Themes in the work of Joseph M. Boyle (New York: Springer, 2011)
- (Co-editor with Fr. Paul Check) Living the Truth in Love: Pastoral Approaches to Same-Sex Attraction (San Francisco: Ignatius Press, 2015)
- (Author) Self-Gift: Essays on Humanae Vitae and the Thought of John Paul II (Steubenville, Ohio: Emmaus Academic, 2018)

=== Journals ===
Smith's work has been published in the American Catholic Philosophical Quarterly, Catholic Dossier, The Irish Theological Quarterly, The National Catholic Bioethics Quarterly, Nova et Vetera, The Thomist, and other publications.

=== Audio and video recordings ===
More than two million copies of her talk, Contraception: Why Not? have been distributed in CD and MP3 format.

- Sexual Common Sense, a twelve-talk series
- Contraception: Why Not?
- Introduction to Sexual Ethics, (Notre Dame, IN, International Catholic University (company)) eight lectures
