= Maurice Zundel =

Swiss theologian (1897–1975)

Maurice Zundel (Neuchâtel 21 January 1897, Ouchy (Lausanne) 10 August 1975) was a Swiss theologian.

Zundel wrote of himself that he was located at “the crossroads of Protestant and Catholic theologies, of Existentialism and of Personalism.”

== Education ==
Zundel completed his Doctor of Philosophy in 1927 at the Pontifical University of St. Thomas Aquinas, Angelicum with a dissertation directed by Reginald Garrigou-Lagrange entitled L'Influence du nominalisme sur la pensée chrétienne.
