= The Catholic University of America Press =

Academic publisher

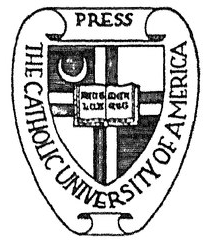
- Historic Logo
- Founded: November 14, 1939
- Founder: Roy De Ferrari and Rev. Msgr. James Magner
- Country of origin: United States
- Headquarters location: Washington, D.C.
- Distribution: Hopkins Fulfillment Services (US); University of Toronto Press (Canada); Mare Nostrum (Europe); MHM (Japan)
- Publication types: Books, academic journals
- Nonfiction topics: Theology, philosophy, history, canon law
- Imprints: Catholic Education Press
- Official website: www.cuapress.org

The Catholic University of America Press, also known as CUA Press, is the publishing division of The Catholic University of America. Founded on November 14, 1939 and incorporated on July 16, 1941, the CUA Press is a long-time member of the Association of University Presses. Its editorial offices are located on the campus of the Catholic University of America in Washington, D.C. The Press has over 1,500 titles in print and currently publishes 50-60 new titles annually, with particular emphasis on theology, philosophy, ecclesiastical history, medieval studies, and canon law. Trevor Lipscombe has been the director of the press since 2010.

CUA Press also publishes books under its Catholic Education Press imprint and distributes the books for Sapientia Press of Ave Maria University, Franciscan University of Steubenville Press, Humanum Academic Press of the John Paul II Institute, and the Academy of American Franciscan History.

== Notable titles ==
- A Primer of Ecclesiastical Latin by John Collins
- Eschatology: Death and Eternal Life by Joseph Cardinal Ratzinger (Pope Benedict XVI)
- The Office and Authority of the Local Prior in the Order of Saint Augustine by Robert F. Prevost (Pope Leo XIV)
- The Intellectual Life by A.G. Sertillanges, OP
- Ethica Thomistica by Ralph McInerny
- The Sources of Christian Ethics by Servais-Theodore Pinckaers, OP
- The Treatise on Laws by Gratian
- The Mind That is Catholic by James V. Schall SJ
- The God of Faith and Reason by Robert Sokolowski
- Saint Thomas Aquinas by Jean-Pierre Torrell, OP
- Some Seed Fell on Good Ground by Cardinal Timothy Michael Dolan
- A Godly Humanism, by Cardinal Francis George, OMI
- Ossa Latinitatis by Reginald Foster, OCD, formerly of the Latin Letters Office, and Daniel McCarthy O.S.B.
- The Church in Iraq by Cardinal Fernando Filoni
- The Black Catholic Studies Reader edited by David Endres
- Understanding the Diaconate by Shawn McKnight, Archbishop of the Archdiocese of Kansas City in Kansas;
- Renewing our Hope by Robert Barron, bishop of the Roman Catholic Diocese of Winona-Rochester
- The Light of Christ by Thomas Joseph White, OP
- The Pope: His Mission and Task by Cardinal Gerhard Ludwig Müller
- The Virtues by John H. Garvey
- The English Critical Edition of the Works of Karol Wojtyla/John Paul II
- Unity in Christ: Bishops, Synodality, and Communion by Cardinal Anthony Fisher OP.
- Be Opened! The Catholic Church and Deaf Culture by Marlana Portolano

== Journals ==
The Press publishes or distributes the following journals, whose electronic versions can be accessed by institutional users on the Project Muse platform.:

- The Catholic Historical Review, edited by Nelson Minnich, is the official publication of the American Catholic Historical Association
- U.S. Catholic Historian
- The International Journal of Sport and Religion
- International Journal for Evangelization and Catechetics
- The Jurist: Studies in Church Law and Ministry in conjunction with the School of Canon Law
- Nova et Vetera
- The Thomist: A Speculative Quarterly Review
- Bulletin of Medieval Canon Law, founded by Stephan Kuttner
- Antiphon: A Journal for Liturgical Renewal (which is the official publication of the Society for Catholic Liturgy)
- Newman Studies Journal
- The Saint Anselm Journal
- Old Testament Abstracts, a publication of the Catholic Biblical Association
- Review for Religious
- The Catholic Biblical Quarterly, a publication of the Catholic Biblical Association
- St. Nersess Theological Review
- Decisions of the Roman Rota
- Journal of Natural Law
- Eolas: Journal of the American Society for Irish Medieval Studies
- The Colosseum: A New Journal of Arts and Letters

== Book series ==
- CUA Studies in Early Christianity
- Catholic Women Writers
- Early Modern Catholic Sources
- The Fathers of the Church
- The Fathers of the Church: Medieval Continuations
- History of Medieval Canon Law
- Islam and Catholic Theology
- Judaism and Catholic Theology
- Library of Early Christianity
- Sacra Doctrina
- Studies in Medieval and Early Modern Canon Law
- Studies in Philosophy and the History of Philosophy
- Thomistic Ressourcement
- Verbum Domini
- Works of Christopher Dawson

== See also ==
- List of English-language book publishing companies
- List of university presses
