= U.S. Catholic Historian =

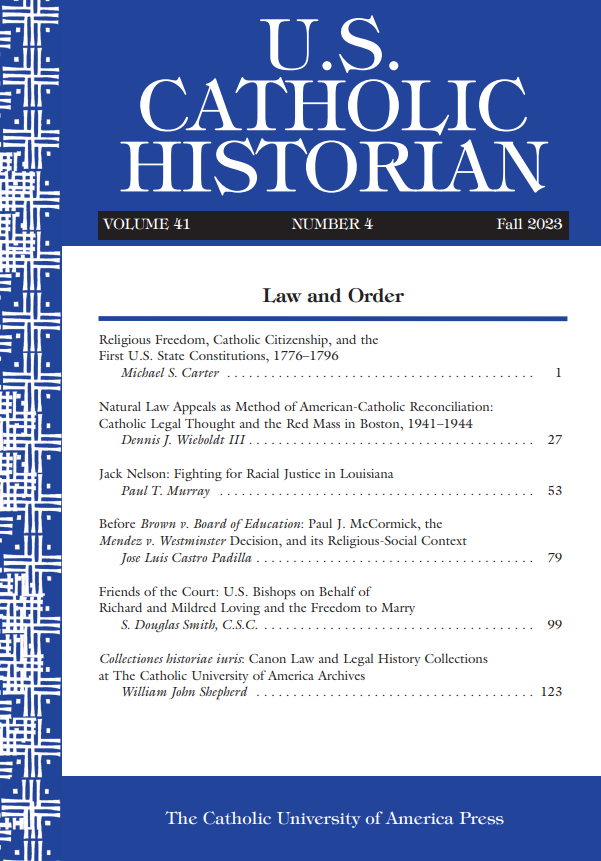
- Discipline: History
- Language: English
- Edited by: David J. Endres

Publication details
- History: 1980–present
- Publisher: Catholic University of America Press (United States)
- Frequency: Quarterly

Standard abbreviations
- ISO 4: U.S. Cathol. Hist.

Indexing
- ISSN: 0735-8318 (print); 1947-8224 (web)
- JSTOR: 07358318
- OCLC no.: 7526668

Links
- Journal homepage

The U.S. Catholic Historian is a peer-reviewed quarterly journal published by Catholic University of America Press.

It is devoted exclusively to the history of the Catholic Church in the United States. Each issue contains articles on a theme selected by the editor and the journal's editorial board.

== History ==
The first issue was published in the fall of 1980. At its founding, the U.S. Catholic Historian was the official publication of the United States Catholic Historical Society (now inactive).

Beginning in 1984, each issue of U.S. Catholic Historian was dedicated to a particular theme. Themes have included urbanism, gender, anti-Catholicism, modernism, black Catholics, Hispanic heritage, and social activism, among many others.

In noting the journal's distinctive approach, historian James T. Fisher wrote, “[T]he journal has presented diverse voices, topics, and approaches as a fundamental organizing principle….USCH quickly grew from a modest format to an indispensable outlet for new scholarship that defined an emerging field and gave its scholars ‘a journal of one’s own.’”

Contributors include specialists in the field of American Catholic history, but also journalists, archivists, theologians, and sociologists. Notable contributors have included Andrew Greeley, Michael Novak, Martin E. Marty, Robert A. Orsi, Bishop Ricardo Ramírez, Bishop John S. Cummins, Mark A. Noll, Albert J. Raboteau, and M. Shawn Copeland.

== Publishers ==
The U.S. Catholic Historian is published by Catholic University of America Press. It was previously published by Our Sunday Visitor Press (1993-2000) and University of Notre Dame Press (2001-2006).

== Editors ==
The U.S. Catholic Historian's founding editor was James J. Mahoney. He was succeeded in 1983 by Christopher J. Kauffman who edited the journal until 2013. The current editor is David J. Endres.

== Abstracting and indexing ==
The journal is published in print form, but also forms part of electronic collections, including Project MUSE, JSTOR, and EBSCO Humanities Abstracts.
