= Dominican House of Studies =

American Catholic institution

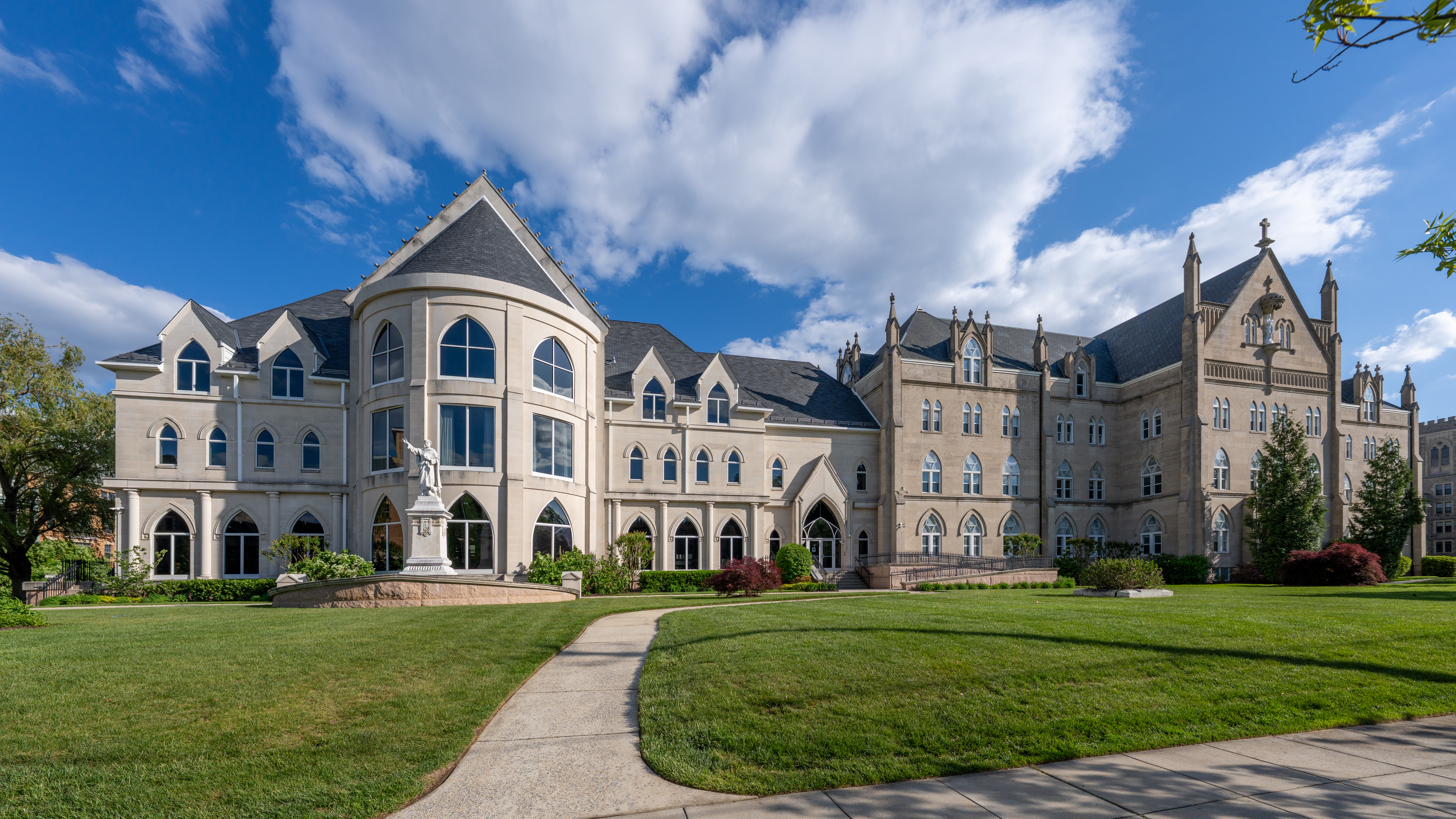
- Interactive map of Dominican House of Studies

Monastery information
- Other name: Priory of the Immaculate Conception
- Order: Order of Preachers
- Established: 1905
- Diocese: Archdiocese of Washington

People
- Prior: Gregory Schnakenberg

Architecture
- Architect: A. O. Von Herbulis
- Style: Gothic

Site
- Location: 487 Michigan Ave., N.E., Washington, D.C., United States
- Coordinates: 38.9317°N 76.9993°W
- Public access: Yes
- Website: www.dhspriory.org

The Dominican House of Studies is a Catholic institution in Washington, DC, housing both the Priory of the Immaculate Conception, a community of the Province of St. Joseph of the Order of Preachers (Dominicans), and the Pontifical Faculty of the Immaculate Conception, an ecclesiastical faculty of theology.

The house is dedicated to the theological formation of Dominican friars and the service of the church in the Archdiocese of Washington. It serves as a formation community for Dominican candidates for holy orders and the Dominican cooperator brotherhood. It is also the location of the Thomistic Institute and the academic journal The Thomist.

== Building ==
The Dominican House of Studies is located in Washington, D.C., on Michigan Avenue NE, directly across from The Catholic University of America. This part of northeastern Washington was once known as "Little Rome" but is today more commonly referred to as Edgewood.

The building was initially called the College of the Immaculate Conception and located on what was then Bunker Hill Road NE. It was designed in the Gothic style by architect A.O. Von Herbulis, architect of several buildings for the Catholic Church. The exterior walls were to be built of Indiana limestone, the building was to accommodate about 150 students, and the estimated cost was $300,000. A building permit was applied for in April 1903. The contract for construction was awarded to the Brennan Construction Company at the beginning of June, 1903. Construction could not begin, however, because a building permit had still not been issued due to a question of whether the proposed slate roof supported by wooden beams complied with laws passed by Congress limiting the height of residential buildings that were not completely fireproof. On June 19, 1903 District of Columbia Engineer Commissioner Col. John Biddle recommend a permit be issued, and construction could finally commence. Construction was completed in 1905 and a private dedication by cardinal James Gibbons was held at 12:00 noon on August 20, 1905. The dedication was held privately since the chapel was not yet complete and available for public viewing. At the time of the building's dedication about 40 students from Kentucky and Ohio were in residence at the college. Once the chapel was completed in 1907 it was publicly blessed in a solemn ceremony by then-Archbishop Diomede Falconio, the Apostolic Delegate to the United States.

== Pontifical Faculty of the Immaculate Conception ==
Pontifical Faculty of the Immaculate Conception
- Type: Private
- Established: 1941; 85 years ago
- Affiliations: Association of Theological Schools in the United States and Canada; Middle States Commission on Higher Education; Washington Theological Consortium
- Religious affiliation: Catholic (Dominican)
- President: Dominic Legge
- Location: Washington, District of Columbia, United States
- Campus: Urban
- Colors: Black and white
- Website: www.dhs.edu

=== History ===
The Pontifical Faculty of the Immaculate Conception (or PFIC) was founded in 1941 by the Holy See; however, it traces its origins to 1834 when the first house of studies (or "general studium") was established in Somerset, Ohio, under the leadership of Nicholas Dominic Young, O.P. After the founding of The Catholic University of America, the province moved the house of studies to Washington, D.C., in 1905. With a major university nearby, the Eastern Province Dominicans could continue the long-standing tradition of training the next generation of friars in close proximity to other universities, while maintaining their independence. In 1941, the Holy See established the house of studies as a pontifical university under the title of the Pontifical Faculty of the Immaculate Conception. Most recently, the PFIC received civil accreditation to award the Master of Divinity during the 1970s and, in 1993 the Master of Arts. The PFIC shares the patronage of the Immaculate Conception with the priory and with the Basilica of the National Shrine of the Immaculate Conception which is across the street.

=== Academics ===
While the Pontifical Faculty was established in order to educate Dominican Friars of the Eastern Province, the PFIC also accepts students from other religious institutes as well as lay students.

The PFIC offers the following degrees:

- Bachelor of Sacred Theology (S.T.B.)
- Licentiate of Sacred Theology (S.T.L.)
- Doctor of Sacred Theology (S.T.D.)
- Master of Divinity (M.Div.)
- Master of Arts (M.A.)

=== Thomistic Institute ===
The Thomistic Institute is an academic institute of the Pontifical Faculty of the Immaculate Conception at the Dominican House of Studies. The institute was originally founded as an academic research institute of the Pontifical Faculty, but evolved to include a network of campus chapters at universities throughout the United States, England, and Ireland that sponsor lectures on theology, philosophy, ethics, and politics. As of 2018, the institute had chapters at around 60 universities.

=== The Thomist ===
The Thomist is a refereed peer-reviewed Catholic theological and philosophical journal published by the Pontifical Faculty of the Immaculate Conception and the Dominican Friars Province of St. Joseph. It is distributed by Catholic University of America Press. It was established in 1939.

=== Notable alumni ===
- Joseph Augustine Di Noia, Adjunct Secretary of the Congregation for the Doctrine of the Faith
- Thomas C. Kelly, former Archbishop of Louisville
- Christopher Cardone, Archbishop of Honiara (Solomon Islands)
- Ernest Bertrand Boland, former Bishop of Multan (Pakistan)
- James Burke, former Prelate of Chimbote (Peru)
- Andriy Rabiy, Auxiliary Eparch of Philadelphia
- Thomas Joseph White, rector of the Pontifical University of Saint Thomas Aquinas in Rome (the “Angelicum”)
- Nicanor Austriaco, professor of Biological Sciences and professor of Sacred Theology at the University of Santo Tomas (Philippines)
- John Vidmar, professor of history at Providence College
- Dawn Eden Goldstein, journalist and author

== Dominicana Records ==
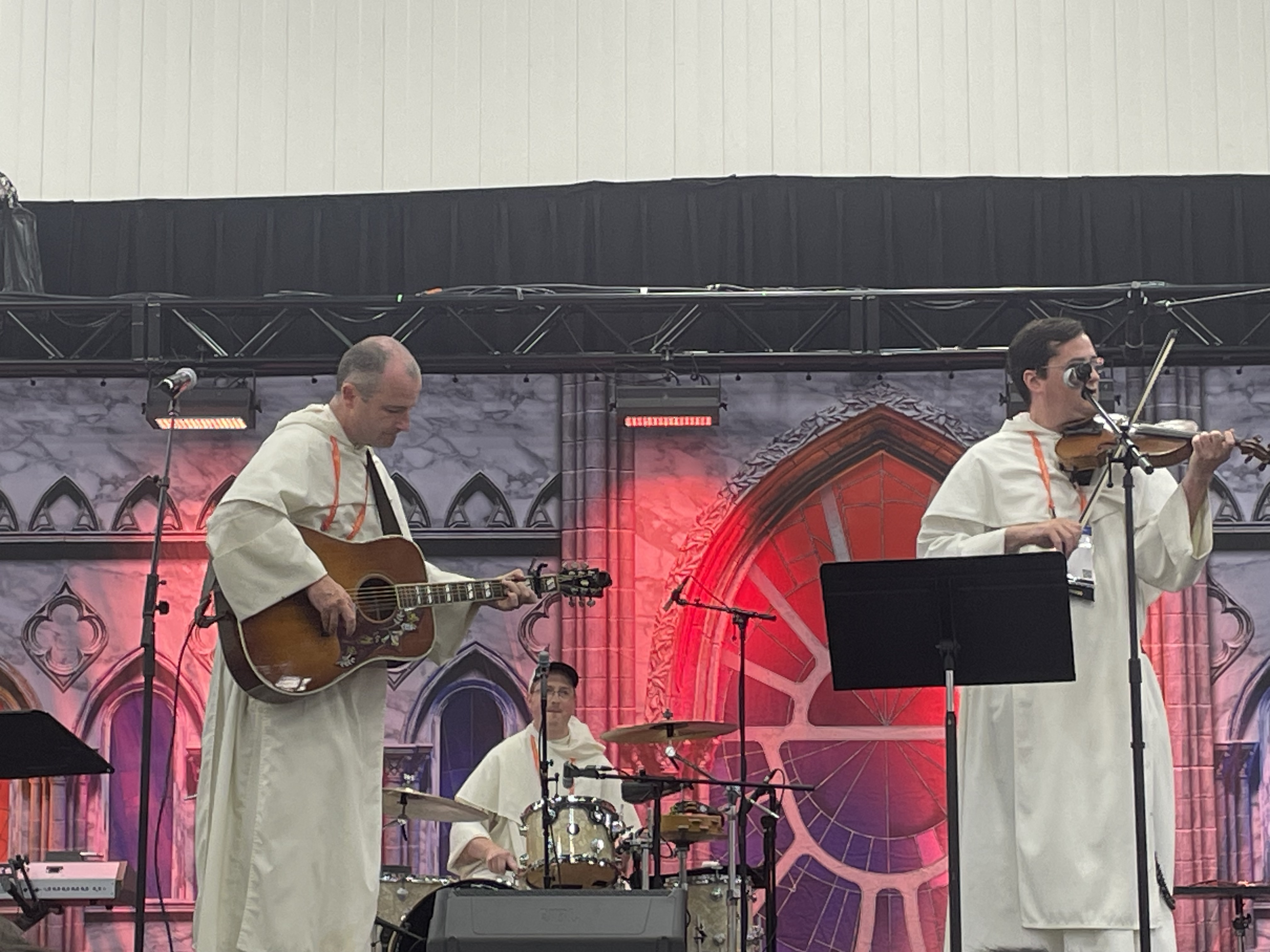
Members of the Hillbilly Thomists playing at the 10th National Eucharistic Congress.

In 2013, Dominicana Records and the student friars of the Dominican House of Studies in Washington, D.C., released their first album: In Medio Ecclesiae. It was recorded in historic St. Dominic’s Church in downtown Washington, D.C., and directed by James Moore. Since then, they have released three additional albums of sacred music. In 2017, Dominicana Records produced the debut, eponymously-titled album of the Hillbilly Thomists, a bluegrass-folk collective of Dominican friars who began playing music together while in residence at the Dominican House of Studies. The release climbed to #3 on the Bluegrass Billboards chart. In 2021, the Hillbilly Thomists released their second album, Living for the Other Side.
