= Gianfranco Girotti =

Regent of the Apostolic Penitentiary

The Most Reverend Gianfranco Girotti O.F.M. Conv.
- Titular Bishop of Meta

Orders
- Ordination: 17 February 1963
- Consecration: 16 December 2006 by Tarcisio Bertone
- Rank: Bishop

Personal details
- Born: Gianfranco Girotti; 21 April 1937 (age 89) Rome, Italy
- Motto: Benignas et humanitas (Benign and kindness)
- Coat of arms: Gianfranco Girotti's coat of arms

Styles of Gianfranco Girotti
- Reference style: The Most Reverend
- Spoken style: Your Excellency
- Religious style: Bishop

Coat of arms of Gianfranco Girotti

Gianfranco Girotti, O.F.M. Conv. (born 21 April 1937) is an Italian Catholic prelate who served as regent of the Apostolic Penitentiary from 2002 to 2012. He previously served as undersecretary of the Congregation for the Doctrine of the Faith. He is a member of the Order of Friars Minor Conventual.

== Biography ==
He was ordained a priest for the Diocese of Rome on 17 February 1963 at the age of 25. He later became a member of the Order of Friars Minor Conventual. He completed his studies in Rome and obtained a baccalaureate in philosophy from the Pontifical Urbaniana University, a licentiate in sacred theology from the Pontifical Theological Faculty "St. Bonaventure", a doctorate utroque jure from the Pontifical Lateran University and a lawyer's diploma from the Roman Rota.

In his order he was Assistant General for legal problems and Attorney General of the Order. In 1969 he was appointed Under-Secretary of the Congregation for the Doctrine of the Faith, and acted as Head of the Discipline Section. He was also professor at the Pontifical Urban University, teaching Law on the Institutes of Consecrated Life, and was a judge at the ecclesiastical tribunal of Lazio.

In 2002 he was appointed regent, the second ranking official, in the Apostolic Penitentiary which deals with the forgiveness of five specific cases: candidates for priesthood who directly participated in an abortion; priests who broke the seal of confession; priests who gave sacramental absolution to a sexual partner of theirs; desecration of the Eucharist; and making an attempt on the life of the pope.

On 15 November 2006, at almost 70 he was appointed Titular Bishop of Meta and consecrated on 16 December by Cardinal Tarcisio Bertone, with Cardinals James Francis Stafford and Jean-Louis Tauran as principal co-consecrators.

In a 2008 press conference, Girotti warned drug pushers, the obscenely rich, environmental polluters and "manipulative" genetic scientists that they were in danger of committing mortal sins. He said that surveys showed 60 per cent of Catholics in Italy no longer went to confession. He said that priests must take account of "new sins which have appeared on the horizon of humanity as a corollary of the unstoppable process of globalisation". Whereas sin in the past was thought of as being an individual matter, it now had "social resonance". He explained: "You offend God not only by stealing, blaspheming or coveting your neighbour’s wife, but also by ruining the environment, carrying out morally debatable scientific experiments, or allowing genetic manipulations which alter DNA or compromise embryos".

In 2010 Bishop Girotti spoke to priests about the challenges and the complex situations that confessors are required to handle. He reminded them that the church seeks to help "even in situations that are humanly so difficult that they seem to have no solution". Among these situations is the plight of divorced Catholics who, if they remarry, are no longer allowed to take Communion. Girotti said that in those cases, if the person cannot separate from the new spouse for various reasons, the confessor could suggest that refraining from sex and transforming the relationship into one of friendship might open the way to the possibility of partaking once again in Holy Communion. He also said confessors must be careful with the psychological states of penitents; if they find themselves with someone with serious problems they should not "try to be a psychologist," but rather seek expert help. He warned that in the case of repeat offenders, who do not show even a minimal intention to change, absolution must not be granted; but the priest must be very patient, because a conversion is always possible.

On 15 September 2012 Girotti was appointed a member of the Congregation for the Causes of Saints for a five-year term.

Catholic Church titles
Preceded by Jozef Zlatňanský	Under-Secretary of the Congregation for the Doctrine of the Faith; 1997-2002	Succeeded by Joseph Augustine Di Noia
