= Eschatology: Death and Eternal Life =

Book by Pope Benedict XVI

- Cover
- Author: Joseph Ratzinger
- Original title: Eschatologie, Tod und ewiges Leben
- Language: German, English
- Subject: Christian eschatology
- Publisher: Catholic University of America Press
- Publication date: 1977, 1988
- Pages: 326
- ISBN: 978-0-8132-0633-2
- OCLC: 17295723
- Dewey Decimal: 236
- LC Class: BT821.2 .R3713 1988

Eschatology: Death and Eternal Life (German: Eschatologie, Tod und ewiges Leben) is a book written by Cardinal Joseph Ratzinger (later Pope Benedict XVI), originally published in German in 1977 and subsequently translated into English in 1988. The book is the study of the "eschaton", the end times in accordance with the Christian doctrine, such as the parousia, heaven, and hell. Among the issues addressed in it is the concept of purgatory, which he argues may be existential—not temporal—in duration.
