= The Hillbilly Thomists =

Catholic bluegrass band

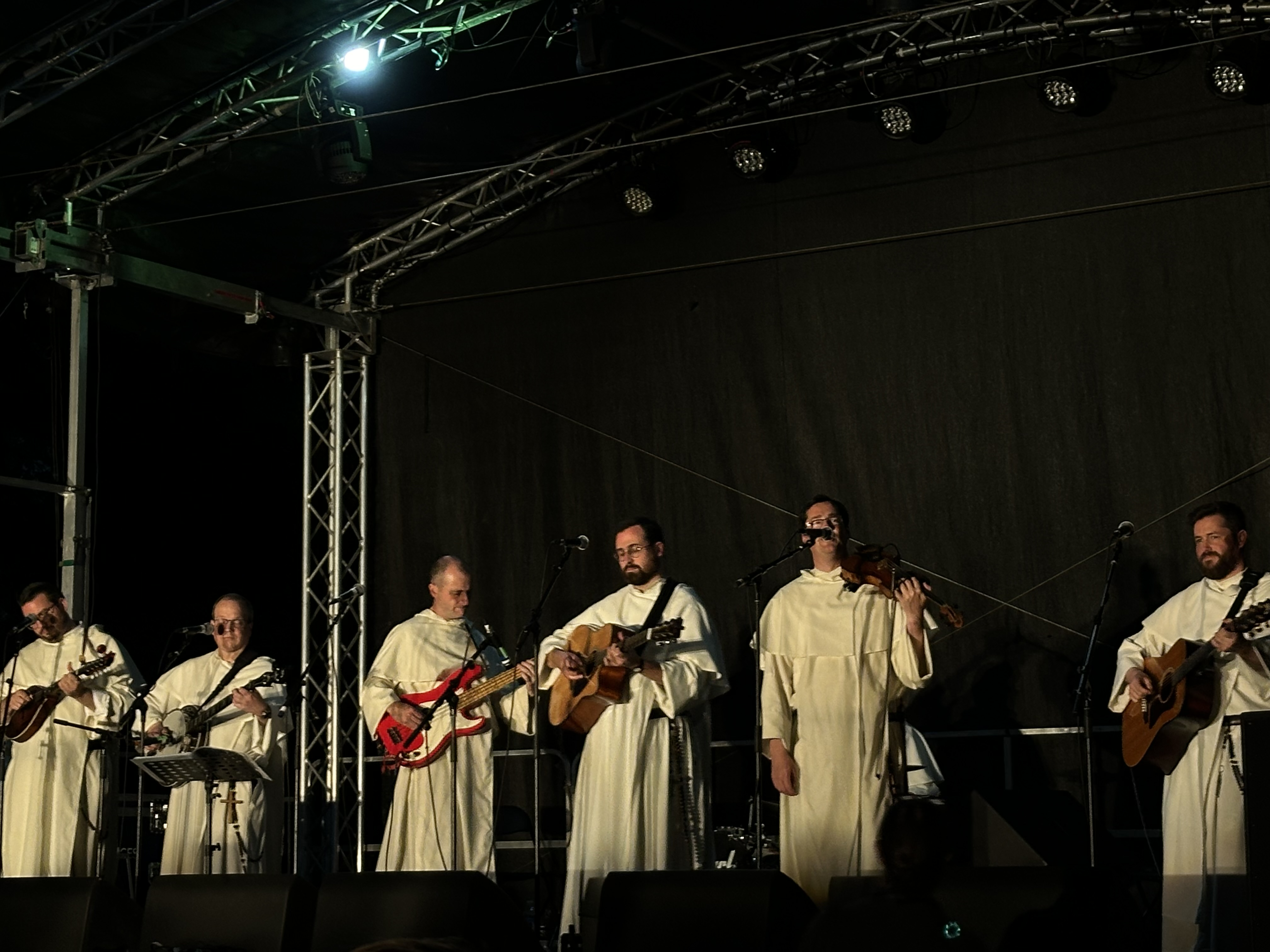
- In concert, 2024

Background information
- Origin: Washington, D.C.
- Genres: Bluegrass music; Appalachian music; American folk music; Spirituals; Irish traditional music; New Orleans blues
- Years active: 2014–present
- Members: Austin Litke; Thomas Joseph White; Justin Bolger; Timothy Danaher; Peter Gautsch; Joseph Hagan; Jonah Teller; Simon Teller
- Past members: Brad Elliott; Constantius Sanders
- Website: hillbillythomists.com

The Hillbilly Thomists are an American bluegrass band comprising friars from the Province of St. Joseph of the Dominican Order. Formed at the Dominican House of Studies in Washington, D.C., in 2014, the band played music locally as a form of street evangelization before releasing their self-titled first studio album in 2017. The band has released five further albums: Living for the Other Side (2021), Holy Ghost Power (2022), Marigold (2024), Carols (2025), and Strange Land (2026) with their first, third, and fourth albums appearing near the top of the Billboard bluegrass chart.

Austin Litke and Thomas Joseph White, both Dominican priests, founded the band and initially played Irish traditional music. The band expanded to comprise Litke, White, and eight Dominican brothers in 2017; Litke and White remain band members with six other Dominicans in 2024.

The band's name references a letter by author Flannery O'Connor. She frequently read Thomas Aquinas's Summa Theologica and believed that her readers should think of her not as a "hillbilly nihilist" but as a "hillbilly Thomist". The Hillbilly Thomists' music draws upon Appalachian music, Protestant spirituals, and Catholic themes.

== History ==
=== Founding (2014–2017) ===
The band originated with Austin Litke and Thomas Joseph White, both Catholic priests of the Dominican Order's Province of St. Joseph, at the Dominican House of Studies in Washington, D.C. Initially playing Irish traditional music, other Dominican brothers joined the group's weekly recreational sessions and formed the band in 2014. As the band began playing at events organized by the House of Studies and as a street evangelization effort in Washington, they introduced additional songs from bluegrass and American folk music.

The Hillbilly Thomists' name is a reference to a 1955 letter by Catholic novelist Flannery O'Connor where she wrote that "[e]verybody who has read Wise Blood [O'Connor's 1952 debut novel] thinks I'm a hillbilly nihilist, whereas...I'm a hillbilly Thomist". O'Connor read the Summa Theologica by Dominican saint Thomas Aquinas nightly, and White felt this description was an appropriate name for a "Dominican bluegrass band composed of students of Thomas Aquinas". White had become interested in Catholicism when he read O'Connor letters before his conversion in college.

=== First album (2017–2021) ===
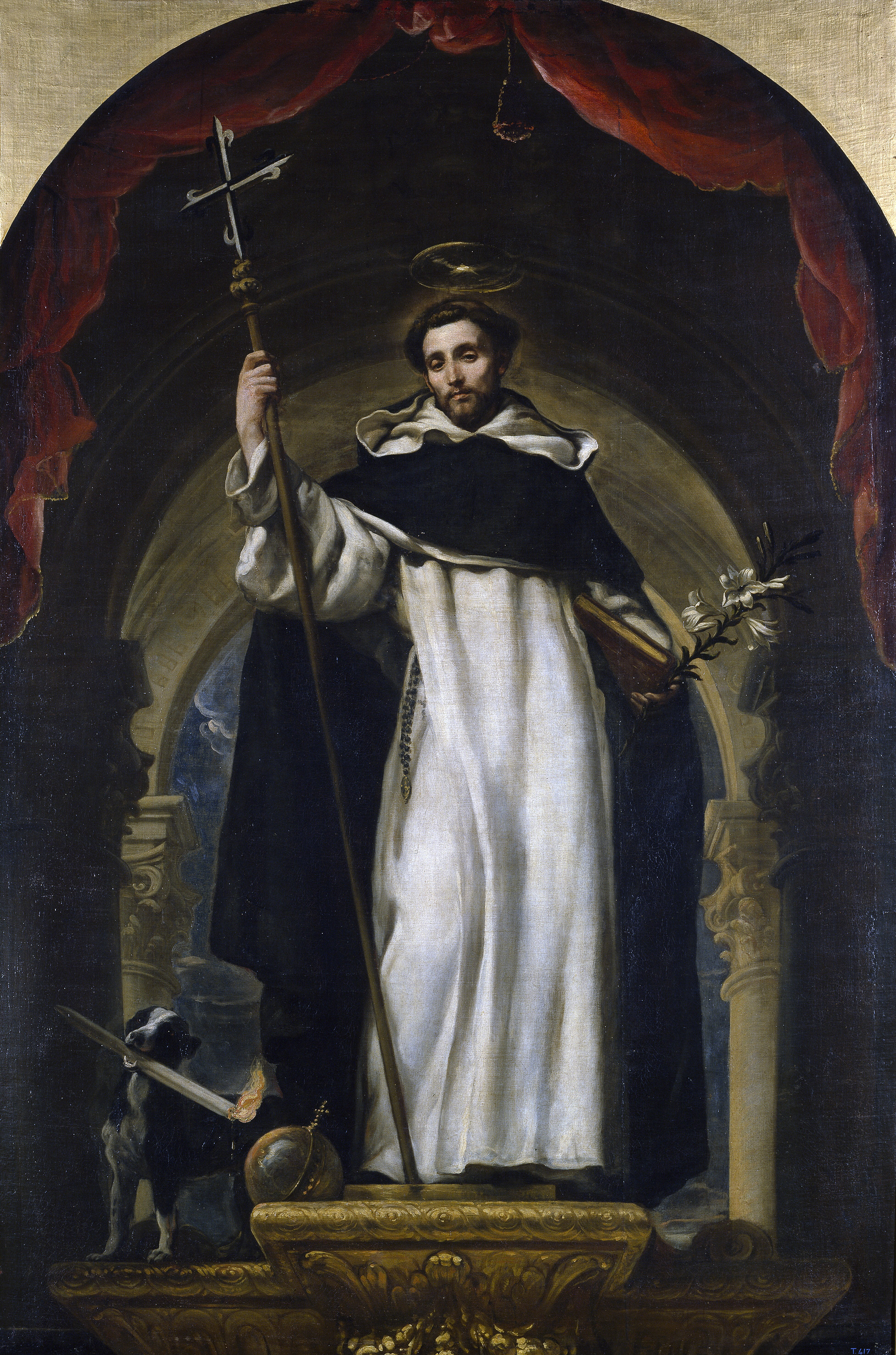
The motif of a "hound of the Lord" with a lit torch in its mouth, associated with Saint Dominic and the Dominicans, served as inspiration for the band's original song "I'm a Dog".

The band played together for almost four years before releasing their first studio album, The Hillbilly Thomists, in 2017. The album contained twelve songs, largely drawn from 19th- and 20th-century bluegrass, Appalachian music, and Protestant spirituals. Two songs–the first track, "Leaning on the Everlasting Arms", and second track, "Angel Band"–had appeared in the Coen brothers' films True Grit (2010) and O Brother, Where Art Thou? (2000). An instrumental, "St. Anne's Reel", was an acknowledgement of the band's roots in Irish music. The album also featured two original bluegrass arrangements of the hymns "Amazing Grace" and "What Wondrous Love Is This". At the time of the album's release, the band comprised the priests Litke and White and eight Dominican brothers: Justin Bolger, Timothy Danaher, Brad Elliott, Peter Gautsch, Joseph Hagan, Constantius Sanders, Jonah Teller, and Simon Teller.

Also on the album was the original song "I'm a Dog" by Bolger that drew upon the Dominican concept of becoming a "hound of the Lord". Dominican tradition holds that Joan of Aza–who is described as the mother of Saint Dominic, the founder of the Dominicans–"saw in a vision that she would bear in her womb a dog who, with a burning torch in his mouth and leaping from her womb, seemed to set the whole earth on fire". The song's lyrics, inspired by this motif, described the Dominican mission of spreading the gospel.

The album drew positive reviews from Matthew Becklo of the Catholic media organization Word on Fire, C. C. Pecknold of the Christian magazine First Things, and Rod Dreher of The American Conservative. The album would peak at the third-place position on the Billboard bluegrass chart. It also ranked in the top 20 of all albums on Amazon. The band hoped their music could serve as both a means for evangelization and fundraising on behalf of the House of Studies; in 2024, Simon Teller said that the band released the album to also help cover their health insurance.

=== Living for the Other Side and Holy Ghost Power (2021–2024) ===
The band recorded their second studio album, Living for the Other Side, over a ten-day span at a Dominican retreat house in the Catskill Mountains and released it on the Feast of Saint Thomas Aquinas, January 28, 2021. This album deviated from the pattern of their first release, with most of the tracks being original compositions by the band. A music video for their song "Our Help Is in the Name of the Lord", written by Bolger and Jonah Teller, was released on January 27 and depicted the friars at work, prayer, and music playing. White–who by 2021 was teaching at the Pontifical University of Saint Thomas Aquinas in Rome–said that he did not view the album primarily as a form of preaching, but instead that its Catholic and Dominican themes reflected the ordinary lives of the friars. Proceeds from the album and the band's merchandise went to the House of Studies.

In a review of Living for the Other Side for the Catholic magazine America, Mary Grace Mangano described the album's lyrics as "poetic, humorous, and truthful" and favorably compared the spiritual music to the works of Thomas Merton. In a review of the same album for Word on Fire, Andrew Petiprin said the song "Bourbon, Bluegrass, & the Bible", written by White, was "one of the high points of the record". Petiprin said that he hoped that the band's work would gain popularity in the secular music world and "cut to the heart with the truth of the Gospel. That's what good preaching always does." In April 2021, the band played at the 150th anniversary celebrations for the Diocese of Providence at Providence College, where Bolger and Gautsch were chaplains.

The band's third album, Holy Ghost Power, was released on July 7, 2022. A single, "Good Tree", was released prior to the full 13-song album. The album integrated elements of the New Orleans blues and rockabilly genres and featured the piano more prominently than the band's earlier work. Catholic themes remained an element on the third album's lyrics, with the title track featuring a reference to the Eucharist and "The Power and the Glory" referencing sacramental confession. A tour to promote the album, the Old Highway Tour, was announced before the album's release and featured stops in Washington, D.C., Pittsburgh, Chicago, Cincinnati, Nashville, Cleveland, and New York City.

As with The Hillbilly Thomists, Holy Ghost Power reached near the top of the Billboard bluegrass chart and attained the number five position. In November 2023, four band members played its first international concert at the Pontifical University of Saint Thomas Aquinas in Rome, drawing over 600 attendees. In 2024, columnist Kathryn Jean Lopez would identify lyrics from the Holy Ghost Power song "The Power and the Glory" as her favorite from the group.

=== Marigold and Strange Land (2024–present) ===
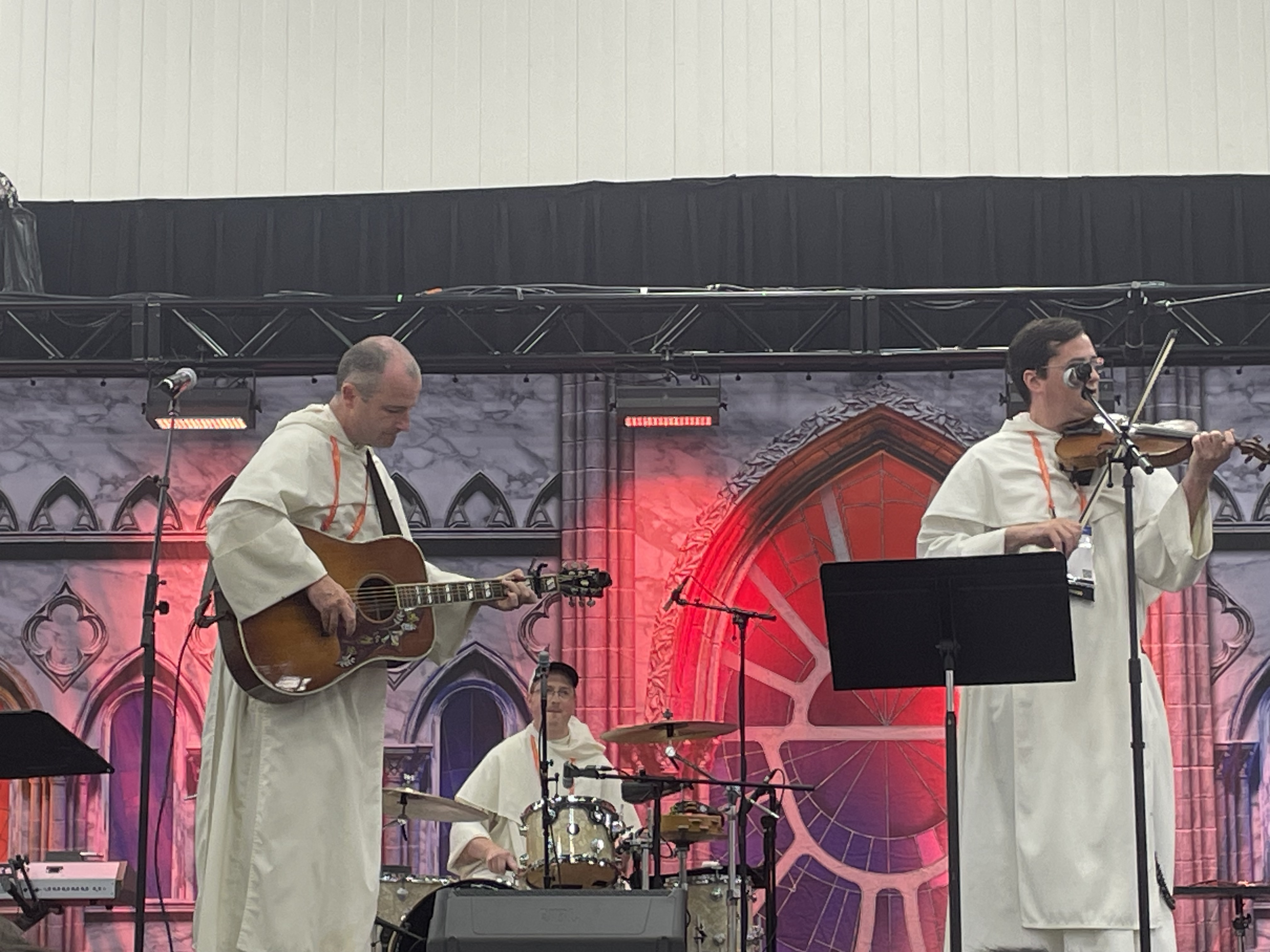
The Hillbilly Thomists at the 10th National Eucharistic Congress, July 2024

The Hillbilly Thomists teased their fourth album in late 2023 with a one-minute video showing the friars recording and praying. The 13-song Marigold was released on July 26, 2024, with one hymn by Isaac Watts and the other twelve tracks written by the friars. The album premiered at the second-place position on Billboard's bluegrass chart, remaining on the chart for three weeks. In 2024, the band's members included Justin Bolger, Timothy Danaher, Peter Gautsch, Joseph Hagan, Austin Litke, Jonah Teller, Simon Teller and Thomas Joseph White.

Mike Kerrigan positively reviewed Marigold for Fox News. Arsenio Orteza, writing for Christian magazine World in September 2024, said that the band would likely not have as significant a following if they were not Dominican friars. However, Orteza found Marigold instrumentally sound and "what their vocals lack in oomph they make up for in harmonies".

The annual schedule for the band members comprise 50 weeks for their ministerial and academic duties, with two weeks dedicated to touring. They played a concert on July 19, 2024, as part of the 10th National Eucharistic Congress in Indianapolis, Indiana. The band played a free show in Park City, Utah, on July 22 and a sold-out show on August 8 in Washington, D.C. Other stops on their 2024 tour included Knoxville, Tennessee, Charlotte, North Carolina, St. Augustine, Florida, and Savannah, Georgia. While in Savannah, the band was able to visit O'Connor's birthplace. A concert by the band served as the conclusion to the second annual Dominican Rosary Pilgrimage at the Basilica of the National Shrine of the Immaculate Conception on the campus of the Catholic University of America in D.C. on September 28.

Two members of the band, Simon Teller and Bolger, joined Zac Brown and the Zac Brown Band onstage to play the song "Chicken Fried" during Brown's performance at Providence College on October 19, 2024. Teller – the college's chaplain – and Bolger were the only members of the band then assigned to the college and the only ones able to participate in the concert.

In December 2024, the Hillbilly Thomists released two Christmas singles, "Lo’ How a Rose E’er Blooming" and "Silent Night". This was followed by a full Christmas album in 2025.

During their 2026 summer tour, they released their next album Strange Land as a surprise.

== Band members ==
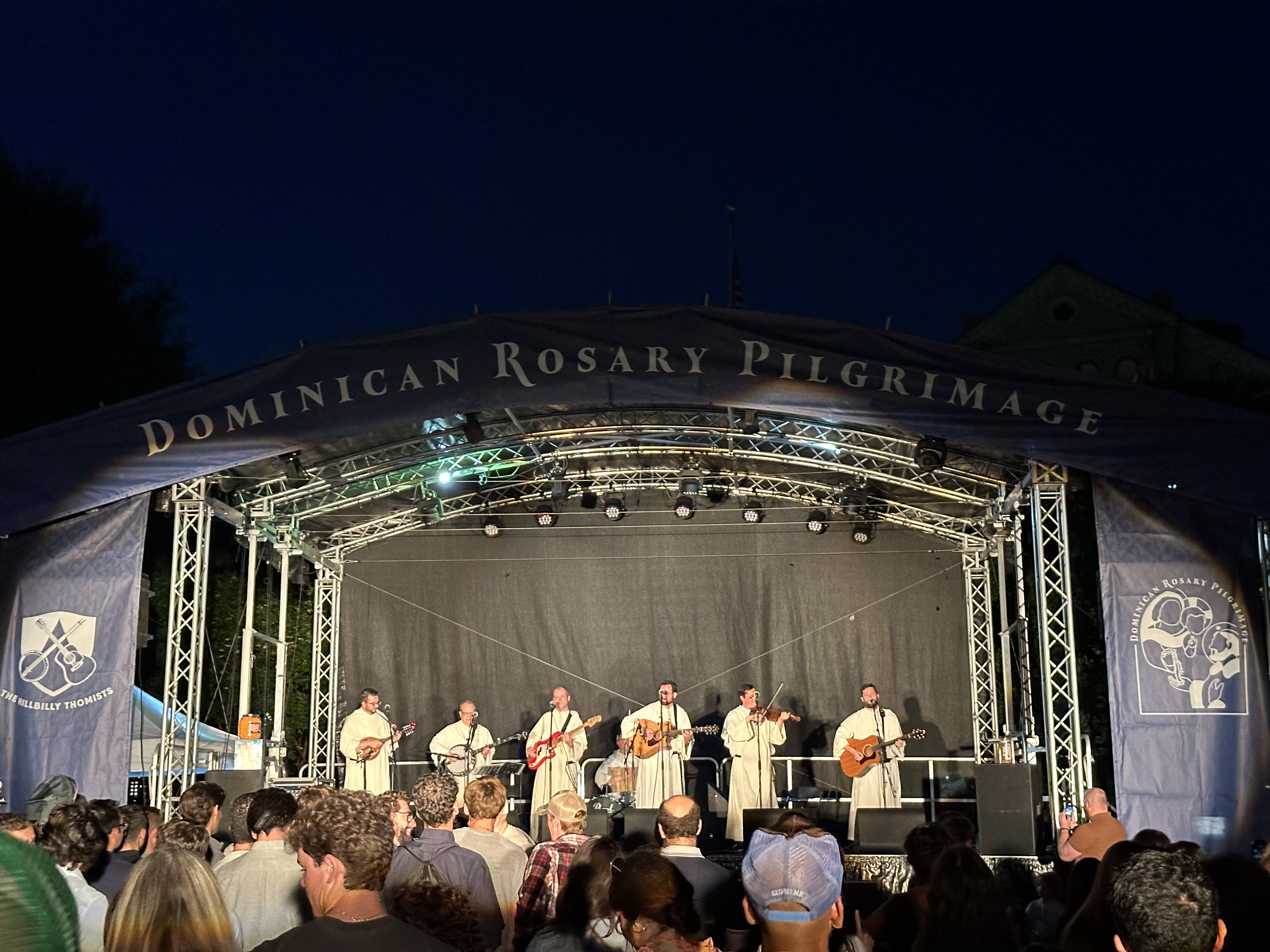
The Hillbilly Thomists at the Dominican Rosary Pilgrimage, 2024

Current members
- Austin Litke – mandolin, guitar, vocals
- Thomas Joseph White – banjo, dulcimer, vocals
- Justin Bolger – guitar, piano, accordion, bass, vocals
- Timothy Danaher – vocals
- Peter Gautsch – mandolin, piano, guitar, vocals
- Joseph Hagan – drums, washboard, bodhrán
- Jonah Teller – guitar, vocals
- Simon Teller – fiddle, vocals

Former members

- Brad Elliott – drums
- Constantius Sanders – vocals

== Discography ==
- The Hillbilly Thomists (2017)
- Living for the Other Side (2021)
- Holy Ghost Power (2022)
- Marigold (2024)
- Carols (2025)
- Strange Land (2026)
