= Nicanor Austriaco =

American microbiologist and Catholic priest (born 1968)

The Reverend Father Nicanor Austriaco OP
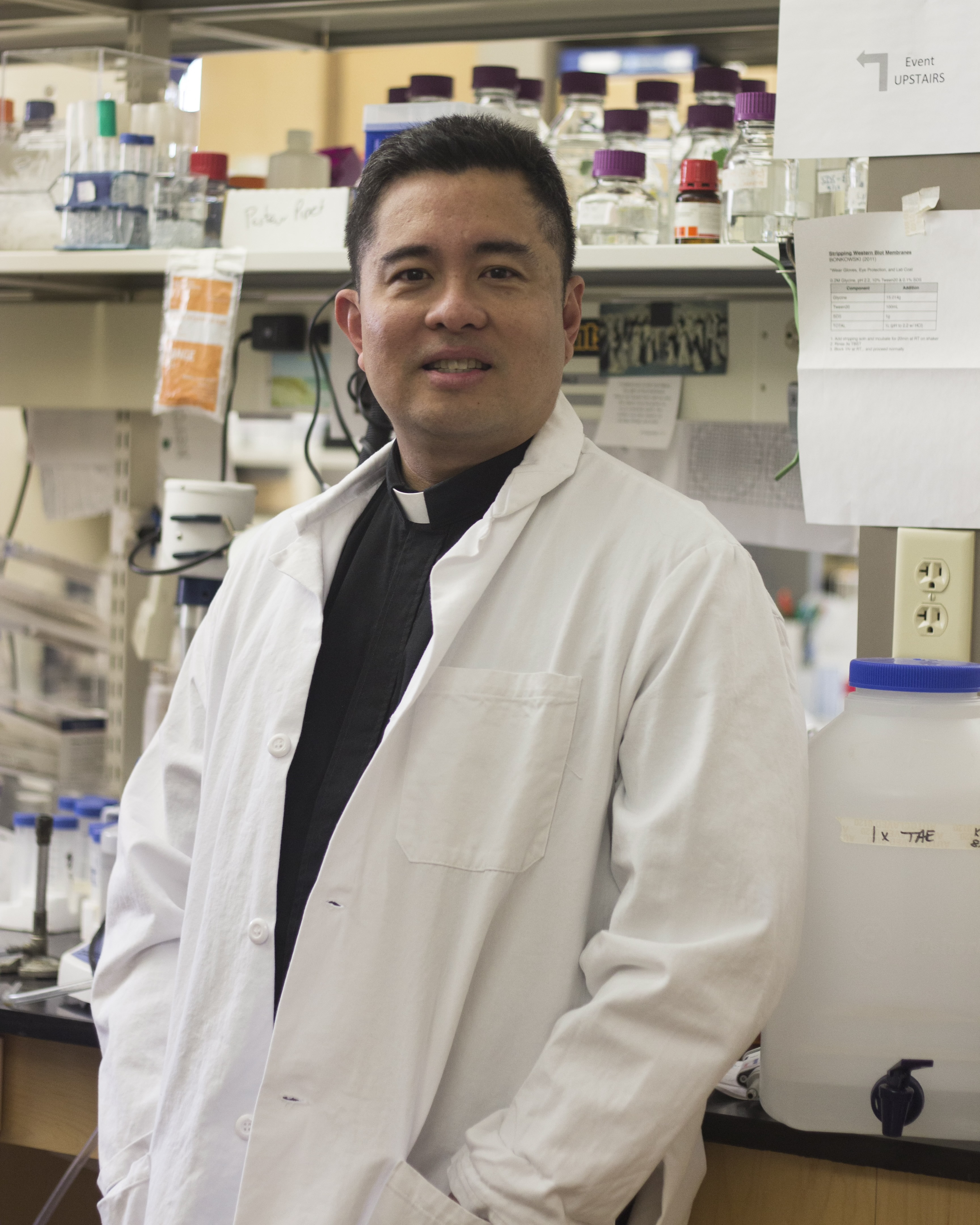
- Austriaco in his laboratory
- Born: Nicanor Robles Austriaco, Jr. November 1, 1968 (age 57); Philippines
- Education: University of Pennsylvania (B.S.E.); Massachusetts Institute of Technology (Ph.D.); Dominican House of Studies (M.Div., S.T.L.); University of Fribourg (S.Th.D.); Providence College (M.B.A.)
- Known for: Biomedical ethics, theology, and the biology of aging
- Scientific career
- Fields: Molecular biology
- Workplaces: University of Santo Tomas; Providence College
- Thesis: UTH1 and the Genetic Control of Aging in the Yeast, Saccharomyces (1996)
- Doctoral advisor: Leonard P. Guarente

Nicanor Robles Austriaco Jr. OP is a Filipino-American molecular biologist and Catholic priest. He is a professor of biology and professor of theology at Providence College, in Providence, Rhode Island, and a research fellow at the Center for Theology, Religious Studies, and Ethics, at the University of Santo Tomas in the Philippines.

== Early life and education ==
Nicanor Robles Austriaco Jr. was born on November 1, 1968, in the Philippines. He attended the University of Pennsylvania where he earned a Bachelor of Science Engineering (B.S.E.), summa cum laude, in 1989. He went on to earn a PhD in biology from the Massachusetts Institute of Technology (MIT) in 1996, where he was a Howard Hughes Medical Institute pre-doctoral fellow in the laboratory of Professor Leonard Guarente. His doctoral research involved the characterization of the first aging genes in the budding yeast, Saccharomyces cerevisiae.

In 1997, after a brief fellowship at the Ludwig Institute of Cancer Research at the University College London, he entered the Order of Friars Preachers. He attended the Pontifical Faculty of the Immaculate Conception at the Dominican House of Studies in Washington, D.C., where he earned his Master of Divinity degree and Licentiate in Sacred Theology. He completed his Doctorate in Sacred Theology at the University of Fribourg in 2015. Austriaco earned an M.B.A. degree from Providence College in 2020.

== Career ==
Since 2005, Austriaco has served on the faculty of Providence College. In the same year, he became an investigator at the Rhode Island Idea Network of Biomedical Research Excellence (RI-INBRE) Program. A theistic evolutionist, Austriaco is staunchly critical of intelligent design (ID). He is also the founding director of ThomisticEvolution.org, which seeks to promote a Catholic approach to understanding evolution in the light of faith. He is co-author of a book on Thomistic evolution.

In 2011, Austriaco published a book titled Biomedicine and Beatitude: an Introduction to Catholic Bioethics. The book responds to questions raised in scientific and medical ethics from the perspective of the Catholic moral tradition that is grounded in a natural law and virtue ethic.

Austriaco has also spoken on numerous questions at the interface between science and religion. Most recently, he has proposed that the historicity of Adam and Eve can still be reconciled with the very best genomic science.

Austriaco is currently a visiting professor of Biological Sciences at the University of Santo Tomas in the Philippines. As a fellow of the OCTA Research Team, he has been interviewed by Filipino TV channels on different aspects of COVID-19.

== Research ==
In addition to his other work and publications, Austriaco is the founder and principal investigator of the Austriaco Lab. The laboratory is located at Providence College and is primarily an undergraduate research laboratory that investigates cell death using the budding yeast, Saccharomyces cerevisiae, as a model organism. Because of the pandemic, the lab has pivoted to developing a yeast based delivery platform for a COVID-19 vaccine that can be easily deployed in developing countries.
