= Thomas Joseph White =

American Catholic priest and theologian (born 1971)

The Very Reverend Thomas Joseph White OP
- Rector Magnificus of the Pontifical University of Saint Thomas Aquinas
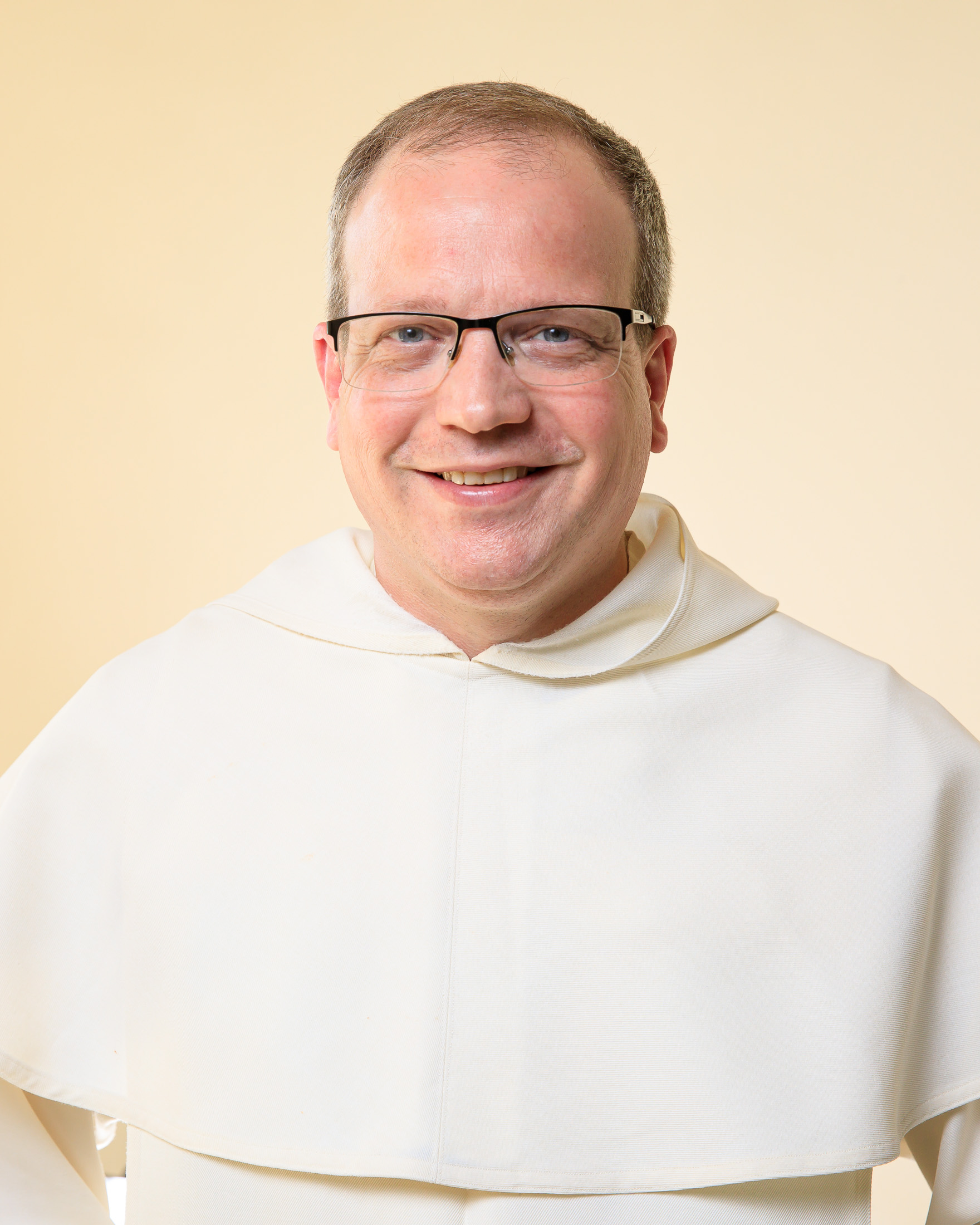
- Fr. Thomas Joseph White, O.P.
- Church: Catholic Church
- Appointed: 10 June 2021
- Installed: 14 September 2021
- Predecessor: Michał Paluch

Orders
- Ordination: 23 May 2008

Personal details
- Born: Seth Rowland White; 23 April 1971 (age 55) Atlanta, Georgia, U.S.
- Education: Brown University; University of Oxford; Dominican House of Studies

Thomas Joseph White OP (born 1971) is an American Catholic priest and theologian who has served as rector of the Pontifical University of Saint Thomas Aquinas in Rome since 2021. He is also a founding member of the bluegrass band The Hillbilly Thomists and is a member of the Dominican Order.

== Biography ==
White grew up in southeast Georgia in an interfaith household. His father, a doctor, is Jewish, and his mother is a nurse. He was baptized by an Episcopal priest in his twenties, but eventually converted to Catholicism his senior year of college. He completed his bachelor’s in religious studies from Brown University (1993) and his Master’s (1995) and Doctorate (2002) in Theology at Oxford University.

White entered the Order of Preachers in 2003. He completed his licentiate in Sacred Theology (2007) at the Dominican House of Studies in Washington, D.C. He professed final vows on May 17, 2007, and on May 23, 2008, was ordained a priest.

His research and teaching concentrate on Thomistic metaphysics, Christology and Catholic-Reformed ecumenical dialogue. He was appointed an ordinary member of the Pontifical Academy of St. Thomas Aquinas in 2011. White taught at the Dominican House of Studies in Washington, D.C., from 2008-2018, and was the founder and director of the Thomistic Institute in Washington from 2009 until his departure for Rome in 2018.

In 2015 White became co-editor of Nova et Vetera, an American Catholic theological journal. In 2018 he was assigned to teach at the Angelicum and function as the director of the Angelicum Thomistic Institute. In June 2021, he was appointed rector of the Angelicum.

On May 13, 2022 White delivered the commencement address at the Catholic University of America and was awarded an Honorary Doctorate of Humane Letters. In June 2022 White was appointed president of the Academy of Catholic Theology, one of the principal societies of academic Catholic theology in the United States. On December 7, 2023 White received the title of Master of Sacred Theology from the Order of Preachers.

White is a founding member of the Catholic bluegrass group the Hillbilly Thomists, which has released four studio albums, to date. In 2023, he was named an official Deering Banjo Artist.

== Bibliography ==
- White, TJ (2005). "The voluntary action of the earthly Christ and the necessity of the beatific vision". The Thomist. 69 (4): 497–534. doi:10.1353/tho.2005.0001. S2CID 171293263.
- White, TJ (2007). "Jesus' Cry on the Cross and His Beatific Vision". Nova et Vetera English Edition. 5 (3): 555–582.
- White, TJ (2008). "Dyotheletism and the Consciousness of Christ". Pro Ecclesia. 17: 396–422. doi:10.1177/106385120801700403. S2CID 171731403.
- White, TJ (2009). Wisdom in the Face of Modernity: A Study in Thomistic Natural Theology.
- White, TJ, ed. (2010). The Analogy of Being: Invention of the Anti-Christ, or Wisdom of God?.
- White, TJ (2014). "Imperfect Happiness and the Final End of Man: Thomas Aquinas and the Paradigm of Nature-Grace Orthodoxy". The Thomist. 78 (2): 247–289. doi:10.1353/tho.2014.0015. S2CID 171660306.
- White, TJ (2015). The Incarnate Lord: A Thomistic Study in Christology.
- White, TJ (2015). Exodus: A Theological Commentary.
- White, TJ (2016). "Divine Simplicity and the Holy Trinity". International Journal of Systematic Theology. 18 (1): 66–93. doi:10.1111/ijst.12133.
- White, TJ (2017). The Light of Christ: An Introduction to Catholicism.
- White, TJ (2020). "The Analogy of Faith in Catholic Theology". International Journal of Systematic Theology. 22 (4): 512–537. doi:10.1111/ijst.12382. S2CID 213302791.
- White, TJ (2022). The Trinity: On the Nature and Mystery of the One God.
