= Réginald Garrigou-Lagrange =

French Catholic friar and philosopher (1877–1964)

The Reverend Réginald Garrigou-Lagrange OP
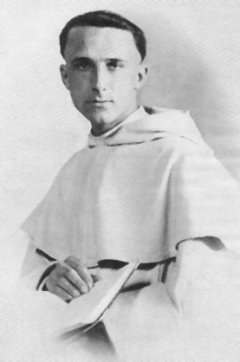
- Garrigou-Lagrange as a young priest
- Born: Gontran-Marie Garrigou Lagrange; 21 February 1877; Auch, France
- Died: 15 February 1964 (aged 86); Rome, Italy
- Burial place: Campo Verano
- Education: University of Bordeaux (medicine); University of Paris (philosophy)

Ecclesiastical career
- Church: Catholic Church
- Ordained: September 28, 1902 (priest)

Réginald Marie Garrigou-Lagrange OP (French: [gaʁigu lagʁɑ̃ʒ]; 21 February 1877 – 15 February 1964) was a French Dominican friar, philosopher and theologian. As a neo-Thomist, he is recognized along with Édouard Hugon and Martin Grabmann as a distinguished theologian of the 20th century. As professor at the Pontifical University of Saint Thomas Aquinas, he taught dogmatic and spiritual theology in Rome from 1909 to 1959. There he wrote The Three Ages of the Interior Life (Les trois âges de la vie intérieure) in 1938.

== Life ==
Gontran-Marie Garrigou Lagrange was born in Auch, near Toulouse, France on 21 February 1877. His father François Garrigou-Lagrange, was a civil servant. Lagrange was the relative of Henri Lasserre, a historian, through his mother, Cleménce Lasserre and his paternal grand-uncle was Maurice-Marie-Matthieu Garrigou. Although Lagrange's family was Catholic, Lagrange in his youth didn't show signs of remarkable piety as was seen in the late nineteenth century of those who would later become saints.

He went to many different schools but one of them was the lycée at Tarbes in which he studied philosophy for about a year. While studying at Tarbes, he wrote an essay on the problem of pain, in the essay he mentions the intellectual, moral and artistic advantages of suffering, but not the religious significance of suffering. After completing his final years in school, he began apprehending a vocation in medicine and thus he commenced his medical studies at the University of Bordeaux in 1896. While studying medicine at Bordeaux, he experienced what he described as a religious conversion after reading Life, Science, and Art by the Breton writer Ernest Hello (1828–85). He would later recall to his Dominican confrere, Rosaire Gagnebet:

I was able to glimpse how the doctrine of the Catholic Church is the absolute Truth concerning God and his intimate life and concerning the human person, his origin and his supernatural destiny. I saw in a wink of an eye that it was not a truth relative to our time and place but an absolute truth that will not change but will become more and more apparent up to the time when we see God face to face. A ray of light shone before my eyes and made clear the words of the Lord: "The heavens and the earth will pass away, but my words will not pass away." I understood that this truth must bear fruit like the grain of wheat in good soil..."

=== Friar ===
Lagrange went through a discernment process, which led him to discern many religious orders but culminated in him joining the Dominican Order; he joined the Dominicans of the Paris province at Amiens in the fall of 1897. Father Constant, a novice master, who plausibly educated Garrigou during his time in the novitiate, was renowned to be an austere friar, but "one who greatly loved the Order and knew how to lead others to love it." In the Dominican Order, it was requisite for a novice to become a priest to continue his journey as a friar, thus after he finished his novitiate the young novice went to the studium in Flavigny to begin his philosophical and theological studies under Ambroise Gardeil to prepare for the priesthood. Lagrange and Gardeil shared a close relationship which would last until Gardeil died in 1938. Lagrange was ordained a priest on September 28, 1902.

While at the Sorbonne, Garrigou was able to attend lectures that included Emile Durkheim, Gabriel Séailles, and Lucien Levy-Bruhl; later in life, he would recall that he had been present at a lecture where Alfred Loisy rehearsed his trademark theme; "Jesus preached the kingdom of God, and it was the Church that came". As fate would have it, it was at the Sorbonne in which Garrigou would meet the young Bergsonian – destined to become a major proponent of Thomism – Jacques Maritain where they would have a good relationship throughout the 1920s to 1930s. This would manifest in Garrigou annually preaching at the retreats of the Thomist Study Circles - a network of groups devoted to the study of Saint Thomas Aquinas established by Maritain in 1922. While Garrigou was teaching the history of philosophy, the studium moved many times because of the anti-clerical laws of the administration of Emile Combes, which affected Garrigou's political outlook.

In 1906, the deteriorating health of Etienne Hugueny caused him to resign from his post and Garrigou was called to ascend to the chair of dogmatic theology at Le Saulchoir. This change was a decisive moment in Garrigou's life which would allow him to devote himself to the study of philosophy which he would relish. As a subsequent result of this change, Garrigou commenced his approfondissement (in-depth study) in the works of Saint Thomas Aquinas and other Thomists who would guide him throughout his life. It was here where Garrigou wrote his first book, Le sens commun, la philosophie de l'être et les formules dogmatiques, a critique of Eduard Le Roy's attempt to interpret the dogmas of the church with a Bergsonian hermeneutic which led Le Roy to downplay the Church's emphasis on radical dogmatic continuity throughout history. In 1909, Master General Hyacinthe Cormier recognized his abilities and assigned him to the Angelicum where he continued teaching dogmatic theology until his retirement in 1959. In 1917 a special professorship in ascetical and mystical theology was created for him at the Angelicum, the first of its kind anywhere in the world.

=== Death ===
As Garrigou began to lose energy, he was moved to the priory of Santa Sabina in Rome subsequently moved to the Fraternitè Sacerdotale Canadienne and died there on 15 February 1964. Benoît Lavaud said:

He leaves us in parting, along with his monumental written oeuvre, an admirable example of religious life and of fidelity to his vocation, to work and to the love of the truth, to apostolic zeal, docility to the Church, to abandon to the will of the Lord whom he served for so long and who just called him to Himself: Euge, serve bone."

== Thought ==
He is best known for his spiritual theology. His magnum opus in the field is The Three Ages of the Interior Life (Les trois ages de la vie intérieure), in which he propounded the thesis that infused contemplation and the resulting mystical life are in the normal way of holiness of Christian perfection. This influenced the section entitled "Chapter V: The Universal Call to Holiness in the Church" in the Second Vatican Council's Dogmatic Constitution on the Church, Lumen gentium.

He synthesized the highly abstract writings of St. Thomas Aquinas with the experiential writings of St. John of the Cross, attempting to show they are in perfect harmony with each other.

Father Garrigou-Lagrange, the leading proponent of "strict observance Thomism", attracted wider attention when in 1946 he wrote against the Nouvelle théologie theological movement, criticizing elements of it as Modernist.

He is also said to be the drafter of Pope Pius XII's 1950 encyclical Humani generis, subtitled "Concerning Some False Opinions Threatening to Undermine the Foundations of Catholic Doctrine".

In politics, like many neo-scholastic theologians of his time, Garrigou-Lagrange was a strong supporter of the far-right movement Action Française and he also sympathized with Vichy France. In 1941 he praised the French collaborationist regime and its Chief of State Pétain in a letter written to his former disciple Jacques Maritain: "I am entirely with the Marshal, I see him as the Father of the patrie, blessed with a good sense verging on genius, and as a truly providential man". Maritain described Garrigou-Lagrange as "valiantly fighting for Vichy," while Maritain's anti-Vichy student Yves Simon wrote of Garrigou-Lagrange, "If I did not hold the sacerdotal role in such respect I would write to him that I would hold him responsible if some misfortune comes to any of my Jewish friends". Indeed, Garrigou-Lagrange went so far as to declare in a letter that for a Catholic to support de Gaulle would be a mortal sin.

=== Mariology ===
With regard to Mary's title of Mediatrix, he distinguished between an ontological mediation – certain and dogmatic, based on Mary's divine motherhood and fullness of grace – and an operative mediation (operari sequitur esse, acting follows being) in the distribution of divine graces.

== Influence ==
L'Osservatore Romano of 9–10 December 1950 lists Garrigou-Lagrange among the names of the preparatory commission for the definition of the Assumption of Mary.

Garrigou-Lagrange taught many Catholic theologians during his academic career at the Angelicum. He also supervised the doctoral research of Marie-Dominique Chenu, who was ordained in 1919 and completed his doctorate in theology in 1920 with a dissertation entitled De contemplatione. In the period between World War II and the Cold War Garrigou-Lagrange was the "torchbearer of orthodox Thomism" against Modernism. In 1926 he served as the definitive consulter to Pope Pius XI in declaring John of the Cross a doctor of the church.

He is commonly held to have influenced the decision in 1942 to place the privately circulated book Une école de théologie: le Saulchoir (Étiolles 1937) by Marie-Dominique Chenu, O.P., on the Vatican's Index Librorum Prohibitorum as the culmination of a polemic within the Dominican Order between the Angelicum supporters of speculative scholasticism and the French revival Thomists who were more attentive to historical hermeneutics.

Garrigou-Lagrange gave the retreat in Paris which attracted Yves Congar to leave the diocesan seminary in order to join the Dominicans. Later, Congar's methodology was suspected of Modernism because it seemed to derive more from religious experience than from syllogistic analysis.

Garrigou-Lagrange also supervised the doctoral research of Maurice Zundel who completed his dissertation in 1927 with a dissertation entitled L'Influence du nominalisme sur la pensée chrétienne.

Perhaps the most famous of his students was the future Pope John Paul II, who was supervised by Garrigou-Lagrange for his doctoral research in the mid-1940s at the Angelicum, and whose encyclical Fides et Ratio is attributed to his training under Garrigou-Lagrange.

Garrigou-Lagrange died on 15 February 1964 in Rome. The International Dominican Foundation (IDF) established Réginald de Rocquois Foundation in his memory at Pontifical University of Saint Thomas Aquinas where he taught most of his career, which grants annual Réginald de Rocquois scholarships.

== Works ==
He produced 28 books and hundreds of articles. Among the most famous works are:

Commentaries on the Summa Theologica of Thomas Aquinas

- The One God, commentary on Summa Theologica I.1-26. PDF.
- The Trinity and God the Creator, commentary on Summa Theologica I.27-119. PDF.
- Beatitude (1951), commentary on Summa Theologica I-II.1-54.
- Grace (1947), commentary on Summa Theologica I-II.109-114. PDF.
- The Theological Virtues - Vol. 1: Faith (1948, English retranslation scheduled for 2018), commentary on Summa Theologica II-II.1-16.
- Christ the Saviour (1945), commentary on Summa Theologica III.1-26, 31–59. PDF.
- De Eucharistia (1943, English trans. scheduled for 2018)

Theological works

- Christian Perfection and Contemplation according to St Thomas Aquinas and St John of the Cross (1923)
- God, His Existence and Nature: A Thomistic Solution of Certain Agnostic Antinomies (1914)

- See also Pierre Duhem's appendix to it: "Note sure la valeur des principes de l'inertie et de la conservation de l'énergie"

- Life Everlasting
- The Sense of Mystery: Clarity and Obscurity in the Intellectual Life (trans. 2017, publ. by Emmaus Academic), French original: Le sens du mystère et le clair-obsur intellectuel (1934)
- Life Everlasting and Immensity of the Soul (1947)
- The Love of God and the Cross of Jesus (1929)
- Predestination (1936) scanned version.
- The Priest in Union with Christ (1948)
- Providence (1932)
- Our Saviour and His Love for Us (1933)
- The Three Ages of the Interior Life: Prelude of Eternal Life (1938), synthesis of Christian Perfection and Contemplation and Love of God and the Cross of Jesus (online)
- The Three Ways of the Spiritual Life (1938)
- Essenza e attualità del tomismo (1945) (in Italian)
- On Divine Revelation: The Teaching of the Catholic Faith (trans. 2022, publ. by Emmaus Academic), Latin original: De Revelatione per Ecclesiam Catholicam proposita (final edition in 1950)
- Principles of Catholic Apologetics, translated (in abridged form) and rearranged by Thomas Joseph Walshe from Fr. Reginald Garrigou-Lagrange's De Revelatione (see below)

Marian works

- The Mother of the Saviour and our Interior Life (1948). scanned version.

Philosophical works

- Reality: A Synthesis of Thomistic Thought PDF. ePub. Free Audiobook.
- Le sens commun: la philosophie de l'être et les formules dogmatiques (4th ed., 1936). English translation as Thomistic Common Sense: The Philosophy of Being and the Development of Doctrine (2021, Emmaus Academic)
- Le realism du principe de finalité (1932). English translation as The Order of Things: The Realism of the Principle of Finality (2020, Emmaus Academic)
- Philosophizing in Faith: The Beginning and End of Wisdom Volume of collected, annotated, and translated articles, published by Cluny Media in 2019

Works in Latin (originals)

- De Revelatione per Ecclesiam Catholicam proposita – Theologia Fundamentalis secundum S. Thomae Doctrinam (Volume I & Volume II)

Works in Spanish (translated)

- Dios: Su existencia solución tomista de las antinomias agnósticas (Volumen I & Volumen II)
- El realismo del principio de finalidad
- El Salvador y su amor por nosotros
- El Sentido Común (Original in French: Le sens commun)
- El Sentido del Misterio
- La Madre del Salvador y nuestra vida interior
- La Predestinacion de los Santos y la Gracia
- La providencia y la confianza en Dios
- La Santificacion del Sacerdote
- La síntesis tomista
- Las tres edades de la vida interior
- La Unión del sacerdote con Cristo Sacerdote y Victima
- La vida eterna y La profundidad del alma

Other

- Complete bibliography
- Nearly all his works in Latin, English, French, Italian, and Spanish are downloadable here.

== See also ==
- Consecration and entrustment to Mary
