= Affectio commodi and affectio iustitiae =

Philosophical concepts

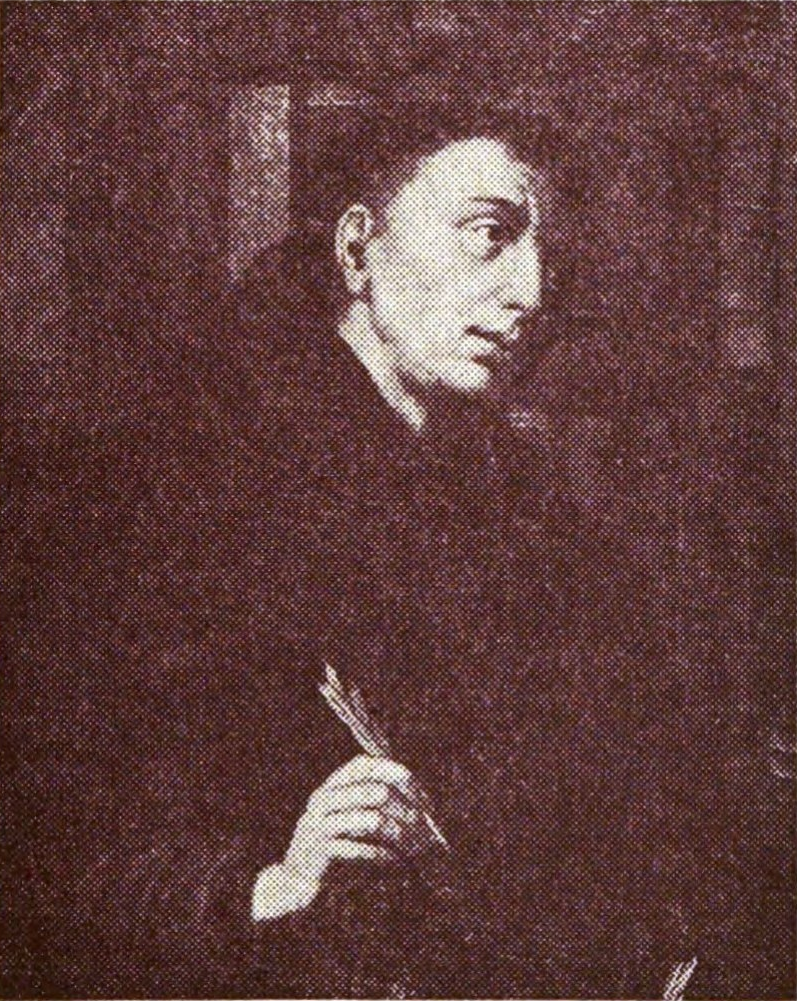
Duns Scotus as depicted in Duns Scotus, defender of the Immaculate Conception by Berard Vogt (1955 edition).

Affectio commodi and affectio iustitiae are two fundamental concepts in Scotistic ethics. In the framework of Scotus' voluntarism and the Christian notion of charity, they are an alternative to the Aristotelian premise according to which every desired good is ultimately directed towards one's own happiness.

The first formulation of the duality was carried out by Anselm of Canterbury in his De casu diaboli, in a fragment regarding the fall of the angels. Despite not using the terms as affections, Saint Anselm explains the rebellion as a free search for an individual advantage (commodum) which went against justice (iustitia), ending up in a larger unhappiness to the angels than that happiness they were searching for when they rebelled. Free will implies the possibility to sin, and sin is defined as preferring one's advantage to justice.

This notion was discussed in Second Scholasticism by figures such as Domingo de Soto or Francisco Suárez. Both did not fully agree with the concept, but made a critical acknowledgement of the distinction and adapted it to fit their systems.

== In Scotism ==
Scotus presents both affectiones as inclinations of the will, deriving from the Scholastic premise according to which all things have "a natural inclination to their own perfection". As appetites were divided between those sensitive and those intellective, and the will had been historically characterized as pertaining to the second kind, a question arises regarding how the will may fail to desire an apprehended good, and which relationship can be established between ignorance and free will considering the latter may seem to be caused by the former. Scotus answers by denying the notion that the will is to be associated exclusively with intellective appetite, a view he characterizes as deterministic.

Scotus prefers to divide the will of rational agents in two aspects: the affectio commodi and the affectio iustitiae. The affectio commodi is equaled to the aforementioned inclination to happiness and perfection of one's own nature. The affectio iustitiae, contrastingly, is to be understood as the desire of good which is not directed towards oneself. As formulated by the philosopher:

Two affections may be assigned to the will, namely, the affection for justice and the affection for the advantageous. The affection for justice is nobler than the affection for the advantageous, understanding by "justice" not only acquired or infused justice, but also innate justice, which is the will’s congenital liberty by reason of which it is able to will some good not oriented to self.

The affectio iustitiae is therefore our capacity to love and seek the good of other entities, not with the objective of attaining any benefit nor to "complete" us but because they are of inherent value. The actions carried out of affectio iustitiae are those morally worthy.

According to the affection for what is advantageous, however, nothing can be willed save with reference to self. And this we would possess if only an intellectual appetite with no liberty followed upon intellectual knowledge, as sense appetite follows sense cognition. The only point I wish to make from this is the following. To love something in itself [or for its own sake] is more an act of giving or sharing and is a freer act than is desiring that object for oneself. As such it is an act more appropriate to the will, as the seat of this innate justice at least.

Scotus differs from Aristotle and Saint Thomas Aquinas regarding the possibility of an opposition between happiness and ethics. Both denied such option considering ethical acting was the means by which "human flourishing" was achieved, and a divinely-guaranteed road to happiness. The Scotistic primacy of the will, however, asserts that this faculty is absolutely free and therefore it can indeed will opposite things. Using the definition according to which moral acts are those with an intrinsic worth and meritorious acts are those which advance salvation, Scotistic ethics are based on honoring the covenant between God and mankind, and the meritorious character of actions is granted by the divine will. This differs from the Thomistic view according to which, as morally correct acts are logically conducting to eternal salvation, there is an ontological coincidence between moral and meritorious acts. In voluntarism, this equivalence is not ontological nor to be taken for granted despite the divine covenant will eventually make it effective. Contrarily to their interpretation of Thomistic ethics, in which human will would be "bound to will happiness" in a universal sense but not in a particular one, Scotists pose the affectio iustitiae as freeing human beings from their natural appetite and providing a "spring of action" directed to the goodness of things which is not necessarily suited to our rational nature. This concept, according to Scotism, "provides the freedom that the will could not have if it were merely intellective appetite". Scotus states

it is clear that a free will is not bound to will happiness in every way in which the will would will it if it were an intellective appetite without freedom. Rather, in eliciting its act the will is bound to moderate its appetite qua intellective appetite, that is, to moderate its affectio commodi, lest it will immoderately.

As Scotus sees it, Thomism supposes that humans always act searching for happiness, despite they may not will the object in which happiness objectively is. Scotus agrees on this regarding the affectio commodi or natural appetite, but warns against believing this concept to be equal to the will or elicited from it. Nonetheless, the affectio commodi is still so fundamental to the will that the latter usually wills its own happiness in the end.

More specifically, the affectio iustitiae can be defined as the inclination of the will to follow the moral law. In Scotistic ethics, the faithful are to moderate their affectio commodi by searching for a primacy of the affectio iustitiae. Instead of following the unfree decrees of our appetites, the believer is to follow the God-given Christian law which frees him from such impulses. Divine commands are to be followed without regarding our own "perfection" or interest as rational beings. Still, the affectio commodi is not to be understood as an invincible decree eliciting any specific act, but an inclination that can be freely followed or not.

== See also ==
- Akrasia
- Divine command theory
- Moral intellectualism

== Bibliography ==
- Bruni, Luigino; Santori, Paolo (2023-07-04). "The theological stems of modern economic ideas: John Duns Scotus". The European Journal of the History of Economic Thought. 30 (4): 577–595. doi:10.1080/09672567.2023.2226396. ISSN 0967-2567.
- Orrego, Santiago (2014). "Recepción suareciana de las doctrinas de Domingo de Soto sobre la causalidad y la libertad". Anuario Filosófico (in Spanish): 149–168. doi:10.15581/009.47.738. hdl:10171/36180. ISSN 2173-6111.
- Soliani, Gian Pietro (2020). "Metamorfosi del bene. Tracce medievali nel Leviatano di Hobbes". Etica & Politica (in Italian). 22 (3): 793–816. ISSN 1825-5167.
- Williams, Thomas (1995). "How Scotus Separates Morality from Happiness". American Catholic Philosophical Quarterly. 69 (3): 425–445. doi:10.5840/acpq199569323. ISSN 1051-3558.
