= The Three Ages of the Interior Life =

Book by Reginald Garrigou-Lagrange

- Author: Réginald Garrigou-Lagrange, O.P.
- Original title: Les trois âges de la vie intérieure
- Translator: Sr. M. Timothea Doyle, O.P. (1947-48)
- Language: French
- Series: Vol. I and Vol. II
- Subject: Catholic theology
- Genre: Theology
- Published: 1938 and 1939 by Éditions du Cerf
- Publication place: France
- OCLC: 459887292
- Followed by: The Three Ways of the Spiritual Life (1938)

The Three Ages of the Interior Life: Prelude of Eternal Life (Les trois âges de la vie intérieure, prélude de celle du Ciel) is the magnum opus of Fr. Réginald Garrigou-Lagrange, a French theologian of the Order of Preachers (Dominican Order). The two-volume publication represents both the summary of teaching ascetical and mystical theology for twenty years at the Angelicum and the synthesis of two other works: Christian Perfection and Contemplation and L’amour de Dieu et la croix de Jesus. The work is framed according to three stages that mark the common path of Christian perfection, which are described in conformity to the preexisting theology and wisdom of Catholic saints and Church Fathers. His synthesis has become one of the most dominant present-day interpretations of this patrimony.

== Overview ==
The namesake and structure of the work are based on the three stages of Christian perfection in charity. Numerous Catholic saints and Church Fathers have attempted to articulate the typical stages, ways, ages, or conversions of spiritual maturation, some of whom proposed a threefold division. Although he explicitly integrates a significant portion of these references, Garrigou-Lagrange prioritizes the terminology of Pseudo-Dionysius, Thomas Aquinas, and John of the Cross as the most representative of their accumulated insight.

Synopsis of Garrigou-Lagrange's model
Age	Degree of union
Unitive Way; Perfect; Adulthood	Eminent and heroic virtues; More intense manifestation of the Gifts of the Holy Spirit; Infused prayer
Passive purification of the spirit	Subjection of the human spirit to God; Preparation for mystical union
Illuminative Way; Proficient; Adolescence	Solid virtues; Initial manifestations of the Gifts of the Holy Spirit; Initial infused prayer
Passive purification of the senses	Subjection of senses to the human spirit; Preparation for infused prayer
Purgative Way; Beginner; Childhood	Initial virtues; Latency of the Gifts of the Holy Spirit; Acquired prayer

Those who are spiritual children, beginning their Christian maturation, require a generous exercise of asceticism and virtue to remove the most serious obstacles to communion with God. This effort with sensible experiences of God's presence and favor. The person typically begins to associate sensible confirmations with God himself, which impedes the capacity to perceive and commune with God more profoundly. In response, God withdraws this sensible presence to dispose the person to spiritual realities and receive the grace for further prayer and union. Generosity begets a more proficient spiritual rapport with God with greater light from the Holy Spirit. Further advancement reveals subtle remnants of pride and selfishness, which can only be perfected by a path of humility directed by the Holy Spirit. Perseverance through this purification allows the person to be perfected in spiritual adulthood, which entails mystical union with God in love.

Garrigou-Lagrange is not the first to recapitulate the common insights of Catholic saints and Church Fathers. However, his model is preeminent in representing the importance and normalcy of infused contemplation, which culminates in a “quasi-experimental” knowledge of God through the gift of wisdom. In other words, the person knows God by recognizing the effects produced from the Trinity dwelling in the soul, particularly that of filial affection, and inferring him to be their cause. The importance of this infused contemplation is not diminished by the call to an active and apostolic lifestyle. On the contrary, infused contemplation is all the more necessary to preserve the integrity and fruitfulness of the mission.

== Impact and Criticism ==
Some have challenged Garrigou-Lagrange’s Neo-Thomistic approach to concepts that are significant to The Three Ages of the Interior Life. Robert Barron, acknowledging the significant influence of Garrigou-Lagrange’s years at the Angelicum, generally associates him with a “strict rationalistic, somewhat ahistorical, very deductive, and somewhat defensive reading of Thomas Aquinas.” The nature of and normalcy of infused contemplation has been debated since Garrigou-Lagrange’s time, and the question was raised if he understands the nuances behind Thomas Aquinas’ use of term “quasi-experimental knowledge.”

The basic concepts of his interpretation continue to be referenced in the Catholic Church. This influenced the section entitled "Chapter V: The Universal Call to Holiness in the Church" in the Second Vatican Council's Dogmatic Constitution on the Church, Lumen gentium. Pope John Paul II, who was taught by Garrigou-Lagrange, alludes to the three ages as the horizon for the spiritual life. Servais-Théodore Pinckaers, another student of Garrigou-Lagrange, also references the three stages in his Sources of Christian Ethics. At large, the model is also commonly used as a reference for providing spiritual direction.

== Bibliography ==
- Barron, Robert (Oct 7, 2019), Understanding the Post-Vatican II Church, Word on Fire Show, 7:07 minutes in
- Burke, Daniel; Bartunek, John (2012), "The Three Ways of the Spiritual Life", Navigating the Interior Life: Spiritual Direction and the Journey to God, Steubenville: Emmaus Road, pp. 87–114
- "Catholic Spiritual Formation – Catholic Spiritual Direction". Discerning Hearts: Catholic Podcasts dedicated to those on the spiritual journey.
- Dedek, John F. (September 1, 1961), "Quasi Experimentalis Cognito: A Historical Approach to the Meaning of St. Thomas" (PDF), Theological Studies, 22 (3), Grayslake: 357–390, doi:10.1177/004056396102200301
- Development Office (July 7, 2018), "Holiness and Moral Virtue", Dominican Friars - England & Scotland
- Eiten, Robert B. (February 1, 1941), "Recent Theological Opinion on Infused Contemplation" (PDF), Theological Studies, 2 (1), St. Mary's: 89–100, doi:10.1177/004056394100200106
- Garrigou-Lagrange, Réginald (1938), Les trois âges de la vie intérieure, prélude de celle du Ciel (in French), vol. I, Paris: Éditions du Cerf
- Garrigou-Lagrange, Réginald (1938), Les trois âges de la vie intérieure, prélude de celle du Ciel (in French), vol. II, Paris: Éditions du Cerf
- Garrigou-Lagrange, Reginald (1947), The Three Ages of the Interior Life: Prelude to Eternal Life, vol. 1, translated by Doyle, M. Timothea, St. Louis: B. Herder Book Co.
- Garrigou-Lagrange, Reginald (1989), The Three Ages of the Interior Life: Prelude to Eternal Life, vol. 2, translated by Doyle, M. Timothea, Rockford: TAN Books and Publishers, ISBN 0-89555-249-3
- John Paul II (2005), Memory and Identity: Conversations at the Dawn of a New Millennium, New York: Rizzoli, pp. 28–30, ISBN 0-8478-2761-5, LCCN 2005922009, archived from the original on 2010-11-10
- John Paul II (Feb 15, 2002), "To the Members of the General Council of the Order of Friars Preachers", The Holy See, Libreria Editrice Vaticana
- Larkin, E.E. (2003), "Three Ways, The", New Catholic Encyclopedia, vol. 14 (2 ed.), Detroit: Thomson/Gale, pp. 65–66, ISBN 0-7876-4004-2, archived from the original on 2012-05-22
- Pinckaers, Servais-Théodore (1995), "Chapter 15: Freedom for Excellence", Sources of Christian Ethics, Washington, D.C.: Catholic University of America Press, pp. 359–374, archived from the original on 2020-03-17

== See also ==
- Réginald Garrigou-Lagrange
- Catholic theology
- Mystical theology
- Christian perfection
- Dark Night of the Soul
