= Thomistic Institute =

Catholic academic institute based in Washington, D.C.

- Shield of the Dominican Order
- Motto: "It Matters What You Think"
- Parent institution: Dominican House of Studies
- Established: 2009; 17 years ago
- Director: Fr. Ambrose Little, O.P.
- Address: 487 Michigan Avenue NE
- Location: Washington, D.C., United States
- Coordinates: 38.9317°N 76.9993°W
- Interactive map of Thomistic Institute
- Website: thomisticinstitute.org

The Thomistic Institute (TI) is an academic institute of the Pontifical Faculty of the Immaculate Conception at the Dominican House of Studies, a Catholic pontifical faculty run by the Dominican Order located in Washington, D.C.

Founded in 2009, its name derives from the order's heritage of Thomas Aquinas, as the institute is influenced by the Thomistic tradition. The institute was founded as an academic research institute of the Pontifical Faculty, and, starting in 2016, began to support a network of campus chapters at universities throughout the United States, England, and Ireland that sponsors lectures on theology, philosophy, ethics, and science.

As of 2025, the institute had chapters at over 100 universities. Counted among its past speakers are Scottish philosophers Alasdair MacIntyre and John Haldane, French philosopher Remi Brague, American philosopher Robert Sokolowski, English philosopher Sir Roger Scruton, Australian philosopher Mark Johnston, and the Theologian of the Pontifical Household Wojciech Giertych.

In addition to individual lectures, the Institute has co-sponsored academic conferences with Harvard Law School, Yale University, New York University, Georgetown University, and Notre Dame University, among others. It also organizes an annual conference on Thomistic philosophy and an annual Thomistic Philosophy and Natural Science conference for faculty and graduate students in the experimental sciences and in philosophy, held in Washington, D.C.

== Directors ==
List of directors of the institute in chronological order:

- Rev. Thomas Joseph White, O.P. (2009–2018)
- Rev. Dominic Legge, O.P. (2018–2025)
- Rev. Ambrose Little, O.P. (2025–present)

== See also ==
- Analytical Thomism
- Neo-scholasticism
