= Nova et Vetera =

Thomist theological journal

- Discipline: Religious studies
- Language: French, English
- Edited by: Fr: Charles Morerod; En: Matthew Levering, Thomas Joseph White

Publication details
- History: 1926–present
- Publisher: Association Nova et Vetera/St. Paul Center for Biblical Theology
- Frequency: Quarterly

Standard abbreviations
- ISO 4: Nova Vetera

Indexing
- ISSN: 1542-7315

Links
- Journal homepage; English version

Nova et Vetera is a Thomistic theological journal that focuses on contemporary issues facing the Catholic Church. Published in the Swiss region of Romandy, the main language of the journal is French. It is also published in a distinct English edition founded by Matthew Levering in 2003. Its current co-editors are Levering, a professor at Mundelein Seminary, and Fr Thomas Joseph White of the Pontifical University of St. Thomas Aquinas. The English edition is currently published by the St. Paul Center for Biblical Theology.

== Description ==
The English edition of Nova et Vetera is published quarterly and provides an international forum for theological and philosophical studies from a Thomistic perspective. It seeks to be "at the heart of the Church," faithful to the Magisterium and the teachings of the Second Vatican Council, and devoted to the work of true dialogue, both ecumenically and across intellectual disciplines. Nova et Vetera is a peer-reviewed journal.

The journal was founded in 1926 by future Cardinal Charles Journet in association with Jacques Maritain.

Authors who have published articles in the English edition of Nova et Vetera include a wide variety of eminent scholars such as Robert Barron, John Joy, Richard Bauckham, Romanus Cessario, Georges Cottier, Archbishop Joseph Augustine Di Noia, Cardinal Avery Dulles, Francis George, Richard B. Hays, F. Russell Hittinger, William Kurz, Bruce Marshall, Francis Martin, Frank Matera, Edward T. Oakes, Michele Schumacher, Christopher Seitz, Janet E. Smith, Geoffrey Wainwright, Thomas Weinandy, Robert Louis Wilken, Edward Feser, and Stephen B. Clark, among many others.
