= The Thomist =

Peer-reviewed Catholic philosophy journal

- Editor: Andrew Hofer OP
- Categories: Theology, Old Testament, New Testament
- Frequency: Quarterly
- Publisher: Dominican Fathers Province of St. Joseph
- First issue: 1939
- Country: United States
- Language: English
- Website: https://www.thomist.org/
- ISSN: 0040-6325

The Thomist is a refereed peer-reviewed Catholic theological and philosophical journal published by the Pontifical Faculty of the Immaculate Conception and the Dominican Fathers Province of St. Joseph and distributed by Catholic University of America Press. It was established in 1939.

The journal publishes both scholarly articles and book reviews quarterly. As of 2022, the General Editor of the journal was Fr. Andrew Hofer OP.
