= Conditional sacrament =

Type of Christian sacrament

A conditional sacrament or sacrament sub conditione ("under condition") is in some Christian denominations a sacrament administered "on the condition that the faithful [receiving it is] able and legitimately entitled to receive the sacrament". An example of conditional sacrament is conditional baptism.

Conditional sacraments are practised by the Catholic Church, the Eastern Orthodox Church, the Anglican church, the Lutheran church, and the Methodist church.

Conditional sacraments are usually performed when there is doubt the previous sacrament(s) was (were) performed or valid, as receiving some specific sacraments more than once is considered impossible in the Catholic Church and the Eastern Orthodox Church.

== Catholic Church ==
If there is doubt concerning the ability of a person to receive any sacrament, the sacrament can be administered conditionally, whether the person is supposed to have already received said sacrament or not.

In the Catholic Church, the sacraments which, due to their sacramental character, cannot be repeated and can conditionally administered are "the sacraments of baptism, confirmation and order".

It is a custom in the Catholic Church to express the conditionality of the conditional sacrament, either audibly or mentally. For example, the person performing the ritual will add the condition "if you are capable" to the sacrament's formula; or in the case of a conditional baptism, the person performing the ritual will add "If you are not baptised" before conferring the conditional baptism. Indeed, it is not necessary to express verbally the conditionality. However, the conditionality "should be expressed audibly when reasons for doubt about the condition of the subject are public. The purpose of the condition is to avoid scandal or confusion in the faithful and, out of reverence for the sacraments, to avoid subjecting them to the possibility of invalidity".

== Eastern Orthodox Church ==
In the Eastern Orthodox Church, sacraments which cannot be repeated and can conditionally administered may include baptism and chrismation.

== Church of England ==
In the Church of England, sacraments which cannot be repeated and can be conditionally administered include baptism.

== Methodist churches ==
In Methodism, baptisms are conditionally administered in cases of doubt concerning their validity.

== Independent sacramental movement ==
According to the Utrecht Old Catholic priest Bernard Vignot, conditional consecration is "very common" within the independent sacramental movement (ISM). The practice of receiving conditional consecration is either performed by ISM bishops who want to receive as many lines of apostolic succession of various origins as possible, or by ISM clergy who doubt the validity of their holy order and "want to avoid any questioning".

== See also ==
- Validity and liceity (Catholic Church)
- Sacramental character
- Sacramental validity
- Ex opere operato
- Rebaptism
- Hugh George de Willmott Newman
- Sacramental matter and form
- Valid but irregular
