= Conditional baptism =

Sacrament in some Christian denominations

A conditional baptism is a baptism performed in such a way as to only be effective if the person is not already baptized. In a conditional baptism, the minister of the sacrament says:

If you are not yet baptized, I baptize you in the name of the Father and of the Son and of the Holy Spirit.

— Book of Common Prayer, page 313

== Rationale ==
Mainline Christian theology (including Catholic, Eastern Orthodox, Oriental Orthodox, Church of the East, Evangelical-Lutheran, Anglican and most other Protestants) has traditionally held that only one baptism is valid to confer the benefits of this sacrament (cf. Ephesians 4:5–6). The Council of Trent defined a dogma that it is forbidden to baptize a person who is already baptized, because the first baptism would make an indelible mark on the soul. Likewise, "Methodist theologians argued that since God never abrogated a covenant made and sealed with proper intentionality, rebaptism was never an option, unless the original baptism had been defective by not having been made in the name of the Trinity."

Therefore, in cases where the validity of a baptism is in doubt, a conditional baptism may be performed. There exist other conditional sacraments. In Evangelical-Lutheranism, the Braunschweig-Lüneburg church order of 1564 "required that any child baptized at home be brought to the church for conditional baptism, a rite that ensured that children baptized by midwives or family members would be properly initiated." This Evangelical-Lutheran church order specified that "parents and godparents were required to attend this conditional baptism, so that they could publicly reject the devil and repeat the remaining responses from the official baptismal liturgy."

Such uncertainty may result from questions about whether the Triune name of God was used by the person administering the baptism. In some cases, there are doubts about whether a church from which someone is converting baptizes in a valid manner. It is an issue where an infant is a foundling, and it is not known whether the child had been baptized before abandonment. Another example of a case requiring conditional baptism is when an emergency baptism has been performed using impure water. Then, the validity of the baptism is in question. In that case, a conditional baptism is later performed by an ordinary minister of the sacrament with certainly valid matter.

In a typical baptism, the minister of the sacrament (in the Catholic Church usually a deacon or a priest, but sometimes, especially when the baptized is in imminent danger of death, a lay person) says "I baptize you in the name of the Father and of the Son and of the Holy Spirit" while pouring water upon the head of the one being baptized, or immersing him or her in water. A conditional baptism simply adds the words "if you are not yet baptized".

== See also ==
- Emergency baptism
- Rebaptism
- Baptism of the dead
- Sacramental character
- Sacramental validity
