= Sacramental character =

Christian doctrine

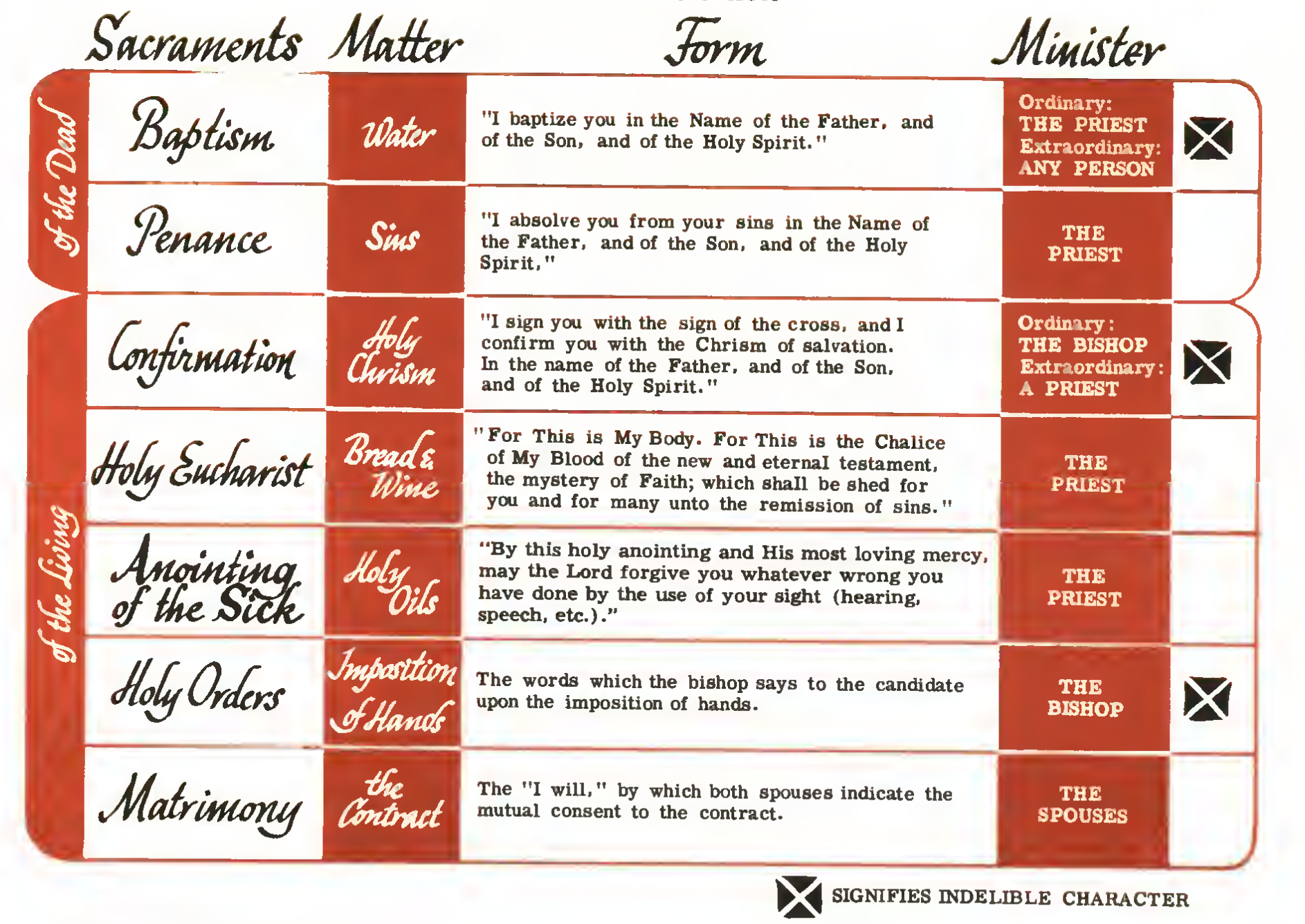
A chart from a Catholic children's catechism, listing sacraments by form, matter, and minister

Some Christian denominations believe that a sacramental character, an indelible spiritual mark (the meaning of the word "character" in Latin), is imprinted by any of three of the seven sacraments: baptism, confirmation, and holy orders. The doctrine is mostly prominent in the Catholic Church, Anglicanism, some of Lutheranism, and within the Oriental Orthodox Churches. Among the Eastern Orthodox, opinion has varied.

== History ==
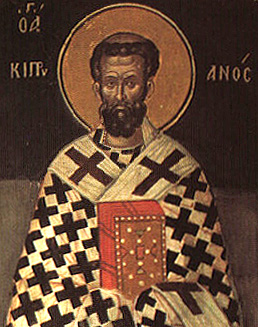
Cyprian of Carthage

The early Christian Church debated the status of lapsed, schismatic and heretical clergy and laity. Two prominent theologians (Cyprian and Augustine) expressed doctrinal opinions in the religious controversies on baptism and holy orders. Cyprian was elevated as the bishop of Carthage, in spite of being a recent convert. His election was contested. During his bishopric, he taught that "if any one is not with the bishop, he is not in the church". Cyprian also emphasized that any minister who broke with the Church lost ipso facto the gift of the Holy Spirit which had validated his holy orders. Augustine of Hippo contrastingly expressed the existence of sacramental character, and emphasized that Christ is always the principal agent.

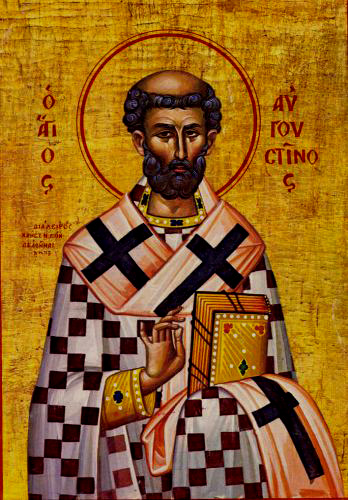
Augustine of Hippo

In Augustine's writings against Manichaeans and Donatists, he analogized military ranks with sacramental character:

Further, if any one fails to understand how it can be that we assert that the sacrament is not rightly conferred among the Donatists, while we confess that it exists among them, let him observe that we also deny that it exists rightly among them, just as they deny that it exists rightly among those who quit their communion. Let him also consider the analogy of the military mark, which, though it can both be retained, as by deserters, and, also be received by those who are not in the army, yet ought not to be either received or retained outside its ranks; and, at the same time, it is not changed or renewed when a man is enlisted or brought back to his service. However, we must distinguish between the case of those who unwittingly join the ranks of these heretics, under the impression that they are entering the true Church of Christ, and those who know that there is no other Catholic Church save that which, according to the promise, is spread abroad throughout the whole world, and extends even to the utmost limits of the earth.

Augustine would also address Cyprian's view of the sacraments, believing that his understanding was not adequate. Responding to the Donatist controversy, Augustine believed they "have the baptism of Christ" and "have the sacraments", though they did not have salvation. He taught against rebaptisms and reordinations to those who also received them from schismatics and heretics.

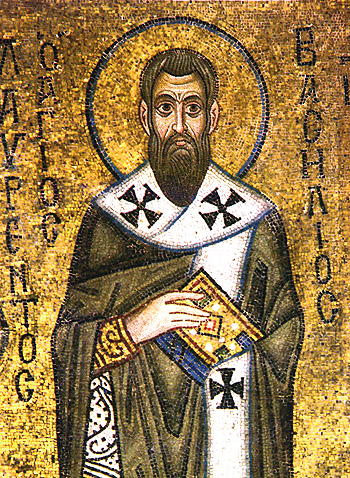
Basil of Caesarea

Basil of Caesarea expressed opinions on the status of lapsed, schismatic and heretical Christians as well. He taught that schismatics "still belonged to the Church". He suggested that previous Trinitarian baptisms only required being received by chrismation; and Dionysius of Rome and Dionysius of Alexandria believed rebaptism of the lapsed, schismatics and heretics as unnecessary.

In Oriental Orthodoxy Unveiled, Coptic theologian Andrew N.A. Youssef stated: "After the Council of Constantinople, the Church eventually chose to follow the middle path forged by Basil the Great".

At the First Ecumenical Council of Constantinople, the Roman state church's bishops received "Arians, Macedonians, Sabbatians, Novatians, those who call themselves Cathars and Aristae, Quartodeciman or Tetradites, Apollinarians" when "they hand in statements and anathematise every heresy which is not of the same mind as the holy, catholic and apostolic church of God. They are first sealed or anointed with holy chrism on the forehead, eyes, nostrils, mouth and ears".

After the Chalcedonian Schism, Timothy II of Alexandria insisted Chalcedonians are received into the Oriental Orthodox Churches assuming they professed the Trinity, the incarnation, and the consubstantiality of Christ's humanity. Only Chalcedonian clergy were required to renounce Chalcedon. According to Youssef, Chalcedonian clergy "were able to receive communion immediately upon drafting their confession of faith although they were not able to celebrate liturgical sacraments as clergy except after a year of penance"; Timothy II insisted that clergy are received without reordination, as if they were ordained by his own hands.

Within the Roman Church, the doctrine of the sacramental character was dogmatically defined by the Catholic Church at the 16th century Council of Trent.

Among the Eastern Orthodox, the 1672 Synod of Jerusalem declared:

But we reject, as alien to Christian doctrine, the notion that the integrity of the Mystery requireth the use of the earthly thing; for this is contrary to the Mystery of the Offering [i.e., the Sacrament of the Eucharist], which being instituted by the Substantial Word, and hallowed by the invocation of the Holy Spirit, is perfected by the presence of the thing signified, to wit, of the Body and Blood of Christ. And the perfecting thereof necessarily precedeth its use. For if it weré not perfect before its use, he that useth it not aright could not eat and drink judgment unto himself; since he would be partaking of mere bread and wine. But now, he that partaketh unworthily eateth and drinketh judgment unto himself; so that not in its use, but even before its use, the Mystery of the Eucharist hath its perfection. Moreover, we reject as something abominable and pernicious the notion that when faith is weak the integrity of the Mystery is impaired. For heretics who abjure their heresy and join the Catholic Church are recetyed by the Church); although’ they received their valid Baptism with weakness of faith. Wherefore, when they afterwards become possessed of the perfect faith, they are not again baptised.

== Teaching by Christian denomination ==
=== Anglicanism ===
The Book of Common Prayer of the Episcopal Church in the United States teaches that: "The bond which God establishes in Baptism is indissoluble". An Episcopal Dictionary of the Church, A User Friendly Reference of Episcopalians states: "The concept of sacramental validity dates from the third century, when the Church of Rome held that schismatics and heretics could administer valid baptism. This contradicted the position of Cyprian, Bishop of Carthage, that the church's sacraments could not be administered by anyone outside the church". The canons of the Church of England also teaches: "No person who has been admitted to the order of bishop, priest, or deacon can ever be divested of the character of his order".

In Anglicanism, the 39 Articles of Religion likewise teaches that the state of an unworthy minister does not discredit the sacraments due to their unworthiness, supposing an indelible mark; Anglican theologian Gerald Bray stated: "If it were, no ministry would be valid, because all have sinned and come short of the glory of God. The validity of a sacrament does not lie in the spiritual state of the minister, which is usually unknown and probably unknowable, but in the promises that the sacrament contains".

=== Catholicism ===
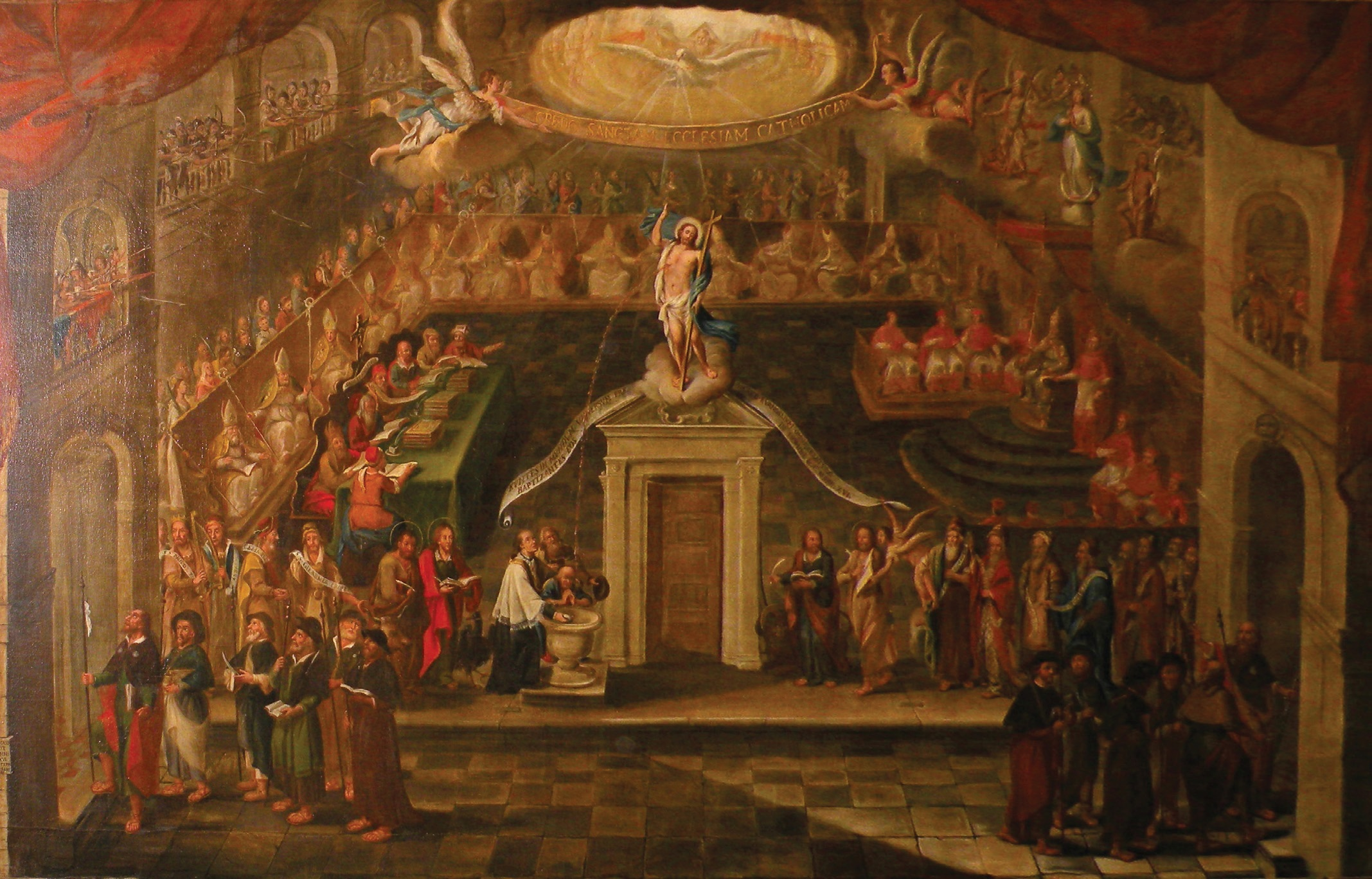
Council of Trent by Bartolomeo Bossi

This teaching—dogmatically decreed during the Council of Trent—is expressed as follows in the Catechism of the Catholic Church (1992):

The three sacraments of Baptism, Confirmation, and Holy Orders confer, in addition to grace, a sacramental character or seal by which the Christian shares in Christ's priesthood and is made a member of the Church according to different states and functions. This configuration to Christ and to the Church, brought about by the Spirit, is indelible; it remains for ever in the Christian as a positive disposition for grace, a promise and guarantee of divine protection, and as a vocation to divine worship and to the service of the Church. Therefore these sacraments can never be repeated.

If it is doubtful whether a person has received the sacrament, the sacrament may be administered conditionally (using words such as for conditional baptism: "If thou art not baptized, I baptize thee in the name of the Father and of the Son and of the Holy Spirit"). However, such an administration is only valid and effective to the extent that no valid administration of the same sacrament has already occurred, as it does not in any event constitute an effective repetition of a valid previous administration of that sacrament.

Thomas Aquinas stated that the sacred character of Trinitarian baptism consists in the disposition to receive the other sacraments of the Church; of the Confirmation consists in the grace necessary "to face the spiritual battle against the enemies of faith"; that of Holy orders consists in the power to administer the other sacraments. The sacramental character and irrepetibility of Baptism, Confirmation, and Holy orders was confirmed during the Seventh Session of the Council of Trent (canon 9 of 13):

CANON IX.-If any one saith, that, in the three sacraments, Baptism, to wit, Confirmation, and Order, there is not imprinted in the soul a character, that is, a certain spiritual and indelible Sign, on account of which they cannot be repeated; let him be anathema.

The Catechism of the Catholic Church, explains as follows the significance of the image of "seal", used as an alternative to that of "character":

'The Father has set his seal' on Christ (John 6:27) and also seals us in him (cf. 2 Corinthians 1:22; Ephesians 1:23, 4:30). Because this seal indicates the indelible effect of the anointing with the Holy Spirit in the sacraments of Baptism, Confirmation, and Holy Orders, the image of the seal (σφραγίς) has been used in some theological traditions to express the indelible 'character' imprinted by these three unrepeatable sacraments.

=== Eastern Orthodoxy ===
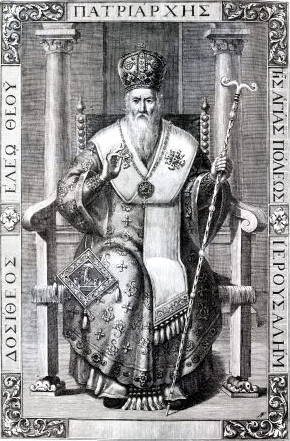
Patriarch Dositheus II of Jerusalem presided over the 1672 Synod of Jerusalem, which decreed a statement on the sacraments

In Eastern Orthodoxy, opinion on this concept varies. The Ecumenical Patriarchate of Constantinople teaches that through "extreme oikonomia [economy]" those who are baptized in the Oriental Orthodox, Roman Catholic, Lutheran, Old Catholic, Moravian, Anglican, Methodist, Reformed, Presbyterian, Church of the Brethren, Assemblies of God, or Baptist traditions can be received into the Eastern Orthodox Church through the sacrament of chrismation and not through rebaptism. Regarding holy orders, each Eastern Orthodox church determines the validity and efficacy of another non-Orthodox church's ordination.

Rodopoulos discusses the theory of what he calls the "ineradicable nature of priesthood", which is the theory that "ordination is ineradicable, and should a defrocked priest be restored, his ordination is not repeated". Rodopoulos states that "[t]he [Eastern] Orthodox Church has not declared officially on this matter. The Church of Rome established this doctrine at the Council of Trent (1545– 1563)". Rodopoulos adds: "Only some [Eastern] Orthodox theologians, influenced by Roman Catholic teachings, have accepted this theory. The long-standing practice of the Church, however, as well as its teaching on grace, reject the theory of the ineradicable nature of the priesthood. Priest who are defrocked return to the ranks of the laity or monks".

Calivas believes that "[t]he character of ordination is indelible".

Scouteris considers that: "no evidence concerning the indelible mark theory can be found in Patristic teaching. On the contrary, the canonical data leave no doubt that a defrocked priest or bishop, after the decision of the Church to take back his priesthood, returns to the rank of the laity. The anathematized or the defrocked are in no way considered to maintain their priesthood".

=== Lutheranism ===
Lutheran theologian Wolfhart Pannenberg stated that: "in terms of the thought of promise and sending that constantly govern the ordained and claim them for Christ's service, we no longer need to oppose [indelible character] on the Lutheran side, since this point of view finds expression in the Lutheran churches, too. Here there is no repetition of ordination".

=== Oriental Orthodoxy ===
Coptic Orthodox theologian Andrew N. A. Yousef states that the Oriental Orthodox Churches recognize baptisms, confirmations and ordinations from the Catholic and Eastern Orthodox churches; and he also stated that universally, "the Church eventually chose to follow the middle path forged by Basil the Great". In Oriental Orthodoxy, for example, baptism and ordination are believed to confer an indelible mark; and Timothy II of Alexandria received Latin and Greek Chalcedonian Christian laity and clergy without requiring rebaptism, with the Latin and Greek Chalcedonian clergy being welcomed into Oriental Orthodoxy without reordination.

== See also ==
- Defrocking
- Episcopus vagans
- Sacraments (Catholic Church)
- Lutheran sacraments
- Anglican sacraments
- Conditional sacrament
- Sacramental matter and form
