= Emergency baptism =

Baptism administered to a person in danger of death

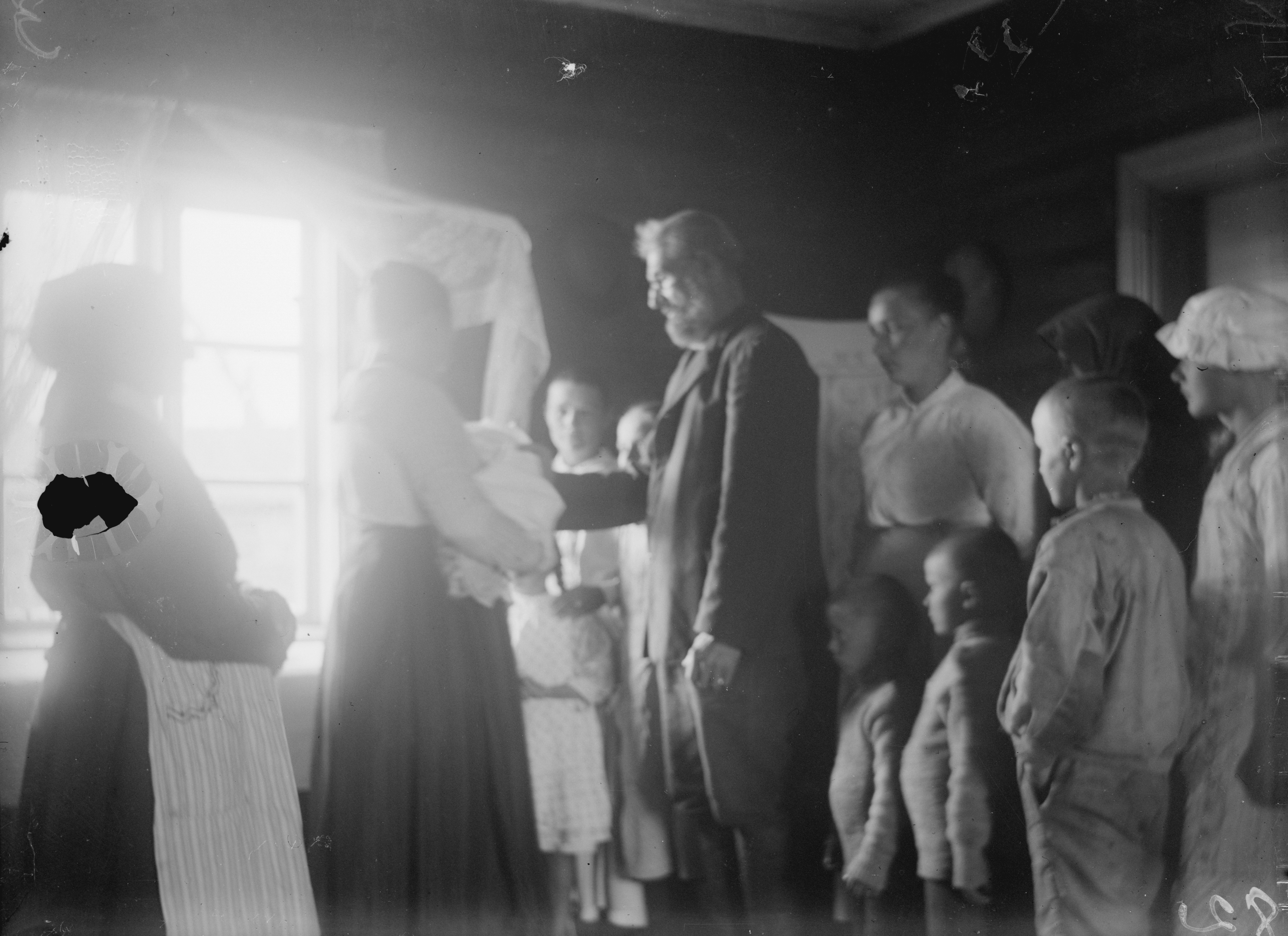
Emergency baptism of an infant in Finland, 1920

An emergency baptism is a baptism administered to a person in immediate danger of death. This can be a person of any age, but is often used in reference to the baptism of a newborn infant. The baptism can be performed by a person not normally authorized to administer the sacraments.

== History ==
=== Antiquity ===
There is evidence that infant and child baptisms have been performed since early Christianity, at least by the time of Tertullian in the 1st century CE and certainly was a regular—albeit abnormal—occurrence by the time of Augustine of Hippo in the 4th century CE. Scholars such as Everett Ferguson believe this was not a routine practice, and instead, anyone in immediate danger of death could be baptized, regardless of their age.

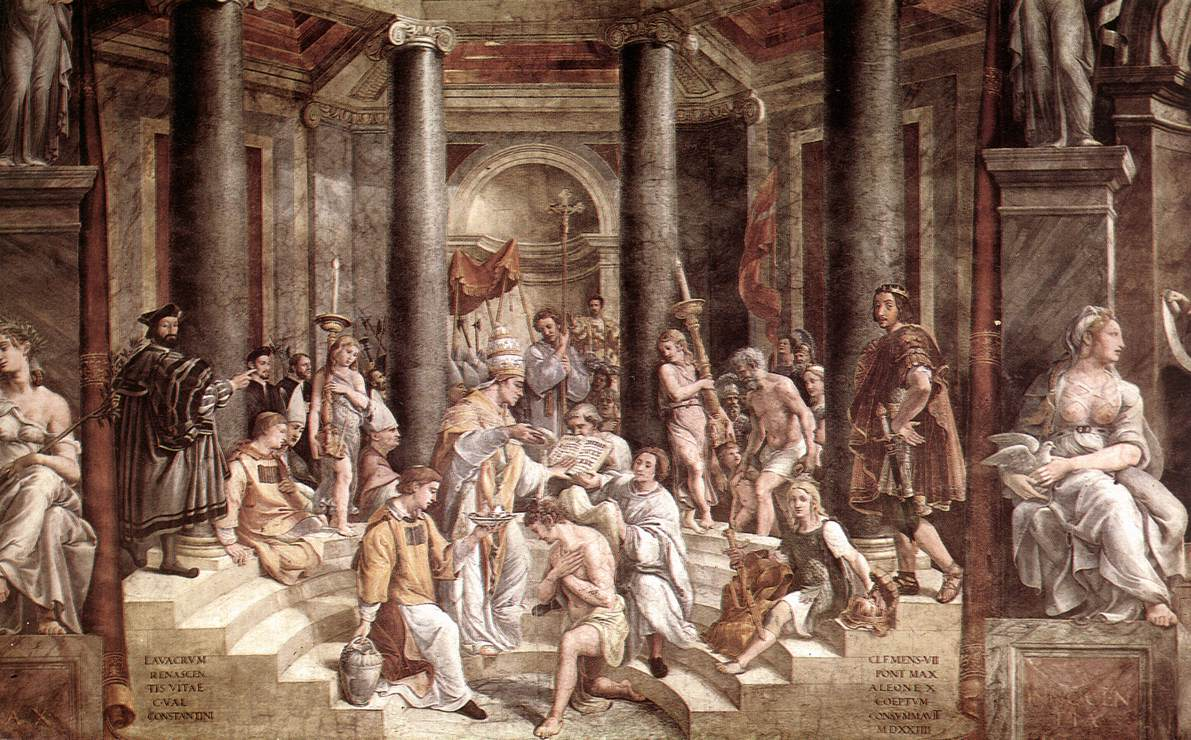
Constantine the Great underwent a baptism while terminally ill, depicted in this 1524 painting by Raphael.

Multiple instances of emergency baptisms survive in the form of epitaphs in Rome, Naples, Greece, North Africa, and elsewhere. Inscriptions often use language like "neophyte" or "received grace", rather than explicitly using the term "baptism". Perhaps one of the earliest examples of an emergency baptism was recorded at the Catacomb of Callixtus and dates to c. 268 CE, in which Marcianus, aged 12, was baptized and died the next day. Another example has been dated to c. 314 CE, which describes the baptism of a Greek Christian child, Julia Florentina of Hybla, aged 18 months, who was "made a believer in the eighth hour of the night, almost drawing her last breath" and died four hours later. For many Christians, it was preferable to push baptism as close to the time of death as possible, in order to cleanse the soul of as many sins as possible. However, the high rate of infant mortality before the advent of modern medicine may have been a catalyst for the later push to baptize infants soon after birth.

=== Modern history ===
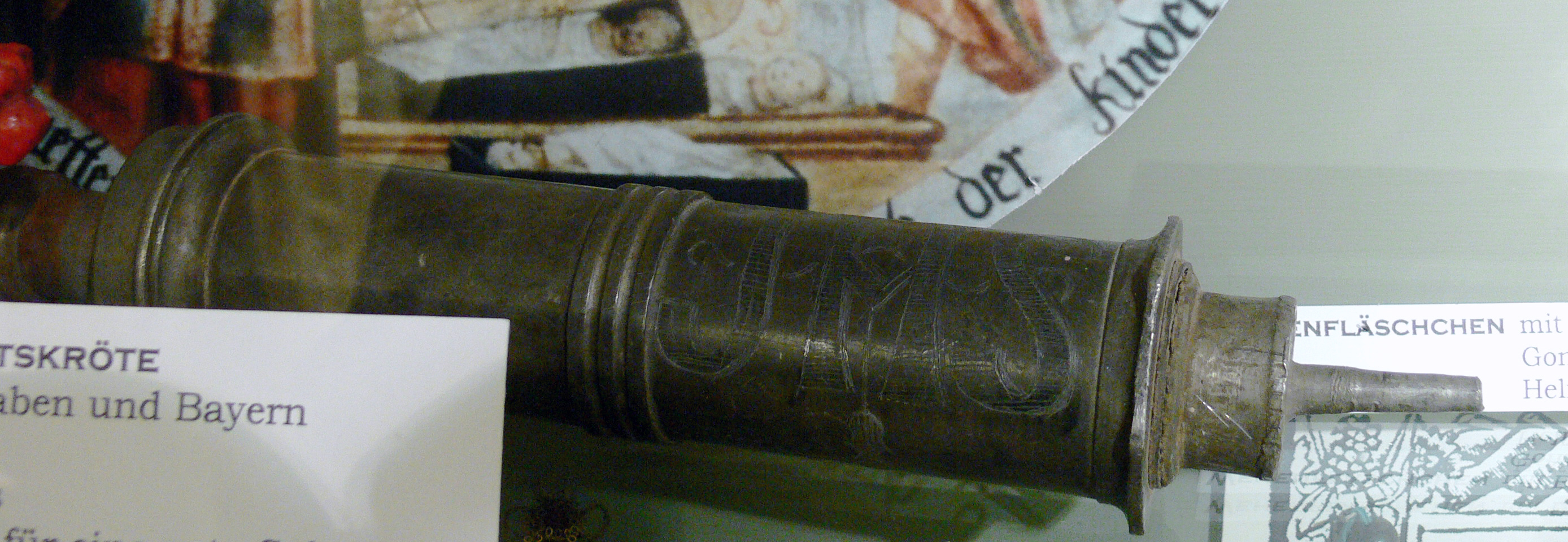
A syringe for emergency baptisms, c. 1800, Germany

As the centuries progressed, midwives were expected to be able to perform an emergency baptism in the absence of an ordained priest. In 16th-century Germany, Martin Luther raised concerns that, in the case an infant survived after an emergency baptism had been performed by a midwife or other bystander, a second baptism to correct any errors would count as a rebaptism and should be avoided. In response, this put pressure on midwives to get the ceremony correct in the first place. In Nuremberg, midwives were held to the Jachtauffen, the midwifery ordinance dealing with emergency baptisms, and swearing their oath included confirmation of their confidence in it. This scrutiny continued into the next century; 17th-century midwifery reforms in the Schwarzburg provinces required midwives to be approved by the town's pastor, and they were expected to be pious and unwaveringly spiritual.

Elsewhere in the Holy Roman Empire, Anabaptist families consciously refused to perform infant baptisms, even in case of imminent death; for this and other beliefs that deviated from Catholic teachings, they were subject to heavy discrimination, which could include banishment or execution. Although they held similar views on emergency baptism, Dutch Reformed customs relied on geography, as they tried to distance themselves from Anabaptists to avoid punishment. Those in locales where anti-Anabaptist sentiment was strong pushed their parishioners to baptize as soon as possible. By contrast, in areas where the Reformed church was not held under such scrutiny, priests encouraged parents to bring the ailing newborn to the next Sunday Mass for the baptism.

== Theology ==
=== Catholicism ===
==== Latin Church ====
In the Latin Church of the Catholic Church, the ordinary minister of baptism is a bishop, priest, or deacon (canon 861 §1 of the 1983 Code of Canon Law), and in normal circumstances, only the parish priest of the person to be baptized, or someone authorized by the parish priest may do so licitly (canon 530). "If the ordinary minister is absent or impeded, a catechist or some other person deputed to this office by the local Ordinary, may lawfully confer baptism; indeed, in a case of necessity, any person who has the requisite intention may do so (canon 861 §2), even a non-Catholic or a non-Christian.

By "a case of necessity" is principally meant imminent danger of death because of either illness or an external threat. "The requisite intention" is, at the minimum level, the intention "to do what the Church does" through the rite of baptism.

The Latin Church considers that the effect of the sacrament is not produced by the person who baptizes, but by the Holy Spirit.

In English, the formula to be employed in order to ensure the baptism is valid is thus: The person pours water over the head of the one to be baptized while saying, "N., I baptize you in the name of the Father, and of the Son, and of the Holy Spirit." ("N" is replaced by the subject's name.)

===== Infants, babies, and fetuses =====
The Roman Ritual declares that a child is not to be baptized while still enclosed (clausus) in its mother's womb; it supposes that the baptismal water cannot reach the body of the child. When, however, this seems possible, even with the aid of an instrument, Benedict XIV declares that midwives should be instructed to confer conditional baptism. The Ritual further says that when the water can flow upon the head of the infant the sacrament is to be administered absolutely; but if it can be poured only on some other part of the body, baptism is indeed to be conferred, but it must be conditionally repeated in case the child survives its birth. In these last two cases, the rubric of the Ritual supposes that the infant has partly emerged from the womb. For if the fetus was entirely enclosed, baptism is to be repeated conditionally in all cases.

Before the Second Vatican Council, an "Order of supplying what was omitted in the baptism of an infant", was in use for subsequently completing the rites of baptism after the survival of a child baptised in an emergency. The Council Fathers requested changes to this order to "manifest more fittingly and clearly that the infant, baptized by the short [emergency] rite, has already been received into the Church".

In case of the death of the mother, the fetus is to be immediately extracted and baptized, should there be any life in it. Infants have been taken alive from the womb well after the mother's death. After the Cæsarean incision has been performed, the fetus may be conditionally baptized before extraction if possible; if the sacrament is administered after its removal from the womb the baptism is to be absolute, provided it is certain that life remains. If after extraction it is doubtful whether it be still alive, it is to be baptized under the condition: "If thou art alive". According to current Catholic teaching, the fetus is animated by a human soul from the very beginning of its conception. In cases of delivery where the issue is a mass that is not certainly animated by human life, it is to be baptized conditionally: "If thou art a man."

=== Eastern Christianity ===
In the Eastern Catholic Churches, a deacon is not considered an ordinary minister of baptism. Administration of the sacrament is reserved, as in the Latin Church, to the parish priest. But, "in case of necessity, baptism can be administered by a deacon or, in his absence or if he is impeded, by another cleric, a member of an institute of consecrated life, or by any other Christian faithful; even by the mother or father, if another person is not available who knows how to baptize" (canon 677 of the Code of Canons of the Eastern Churches.)

The discipline of the Eastern Orthodox Church, Oriental Orthodoxy and the Assyrian Church of the East is similar to that of the Eastern Catholic Churches. However, they require the baptizer, even in cases of necessity, to be of their own faith, on the grounds that a person cannot convey what he himself does not possess, in this case membership in the Body of Christ.

=== Lutheranism ===
In Lutheranism, liturgical books such as the Lutheran Book of Worship provide the rite of emergency baptism. If a pastor is not available, "anyone who is baptised can perform the baptism."

=== Anglicanism ===
Similar provisions exist throughout the constituent churches of the Anglican Communion.

==== Church of England ====
According to Common Worship, if a minister is unavailable, the baptizing party can be a common layperson, but the administer of the rites must later inform the minister who would have been responsible for the ceremony. In the case of an infant baptism, the parents must request it be performed. If a name cannot be provided, the baptism is allowed to go forth without using one. If the baptized person survives, they should then present themselves to the church for a proper baptismal ceremony. Some rites are omitted as they are considered to have already taken place, but the person should be anointed with chrism—specifically consecrated by the bishop—after receiving the blessing.

==== American Episcopalian ====
For the Episcopal Church in the United States of America, the 1979 Book of Common Prayer states that "Holy Baptism is especially appropriate at the Easter Vigil, on the day of Pentecost, on All Saints' Day or the Sunday after All Saints' day, and on the Feast of the Baptism of our Lord . . . It is recommended that, as far as possible, Baptisms be reserved for these occasions or when a bishop is present. If on any one of the above-named days the ministry of a bishop or priest cannot be obtained, the bishop may specially authorize a deacon to preside. In that case, the deacon omits the prayer over the candidates, page 308, and the formula and action which follow." The Book of Common Prayer also specifies under the heading "Emergency Baptism" the following:

In case of emergency, any baptized person may administer Baptism according to the following form.

Using the given name of the one to be baptized (if known), pour water on him or her, saying

I baptize you in the Name of the Father, and of the Son, and of the Holy Spirit.

The Lord's Prayer is then said.

Other prayers, such as the following, may be added

Heavenly Father, we thank you that by water and the Holy Spirit you have bestowed on upon this your servant the forgiveness of sin and have raised him to the new life of grace. Strengthen him, O Lord, with your presence, enfold him in the arms of your mercy, and keep him safe forever.

The person who administers emergency Baptism should inform the priest of the appropriate parish, so that the fact can be properly recorded.

If the baptized person recovers, the Baptism should be recognized at a public celebration of the Sacrament with a bishop or priest presiding, and the person baptized under emergency conditions, together with the sponsors or godparents, taking part in everything except the administration of the water.

— Emergency Baptism, pp 313-4, The Book of Common Prayer

=== Methodism ===
For Methodists, as well as some High Church Protestant denominations, the ordinary minister of baptism is a duly ordained or appointed minister of religion.

== Controversial baptisms of Jews ==
In 1858, Edgardo Mortara, then reportedly six years old, was taken from his Jewish parents by the police of the Papal States. He had reportedly been baptized, when he was one, by a Roman Catholic servant girl of the family while he was ill, because she feared that otherwise he would not be saved if he died.

The Jewish orphans controversy is a legal dispute that occurred after the Second World War when the Holy See under Pope Pius XII issued instructions that Catholic institutions and families should keep baptized Jewish children in their ranks after they had been rescued from a likely deportation to Auschwitz. The Church, however, maintains it returned such children to their relatives, if any could be found.

== See also ==
- Baptism of the dead
- Conditional baptism
- Deathbed conversion
