= Defrocking =

Removal of clergy from ordained ministry

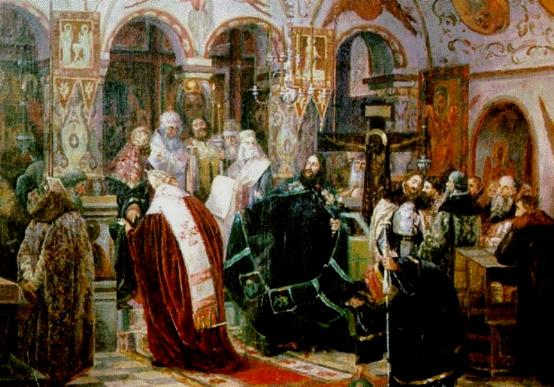
Defrocking of Patriarch Nikon of Moscow

Defrocking, unfrocking, degradation, or laicization of clergy is the removal of their rights to exercise the functions of the ordained ministry. It may be grounded on criminal convictions, disciplinary problems, or disagreements over doctrine or dogma; but may also be done at their request for personal reasons, such as running for civil office, taking over a family business, declining health or old age, desire to marry against the rules for clergy in a particular church, or an unresolved dispute. The form of the procedure varies according to the Christian denomination concerned.

The words "defrocking" or "unfrocking" refers to the ritual removal of the frock-like vestments of clergy and ministers. These rituals are generally no longer practiced and were sometimes separate from dismissals from ordained ministry, leading some to contend that modern use of "defrocking" is inaccurate. However, others maintain "defrocking" as a common synonym for laicization, one particularly popular in English.

== History ==
In the Medieval and Renaissance church, priests were publicly defrocked or "degraded" by having their vestments ceremonially removed. The procedure was intended to evoke shame and humiliation in the subject. A description of the degradation of Archbishop Thomas Cranmer for heresy in 1556, based on eye-witness accounts, was recorded by John Foxe:

...when they came to take off his pall, (which is a solemn vesture of an archbishop,) then said he, "Which of you hath a pall, to take off my pall;" which imported as much as they, being his inferiors, could not degrade him. Whereunto one of them said, in that they were but bishops, they were his inferiors, and not competent judges; but being the pope's delegates, they might take his pall. And so they did, and so proceeding took every thing in order from him, as it was put on. Then a barber clipped his hair round about, and the bishop scraped the tops of his fingers where he had been anointed... Last of all they stripped him out of his gown into his jacket, and put upon him a poor yeoman-beadle's gown, full bare and nearly worn, and as evil-favouredly made as one might lightly see, and a townsman's cap on his head; and so delivered him to the secular power".

== Catholicism ==
Members of the Catholic Church clergy may be dismissed from the clerical state, an action known as "laicization". The term "defrocking" is not normally used within the Catholic Church, although journalistic reports on laicization of Catholic clergy sometimes use it. Laicization differs from suspension. The latter is a censure prohibiting certain acts by a cleric, whether the acts are of a religious character deriving from his ordination ("acts of the power of orders") or are exercises of his power of governance or of rights and functions attached to the office he holds. As a censure, suspension is meant to cease when the censured person shows repentance. Laicization, on the contrary, is a permanent measure, whereby for a sufficient reason a cleric is from then on juridically treated as a layman. Laicization is sometimes imposed as a punishment (Latin, ad poenam), or it may be granted as a favour (Latin, pro gratia) at the priest's own request. New regulations issued in 2009 regarding priests who abandon their ministry for more than five years and whose behaviour is a cause of serious scandal have made it easier for bishops to secure laicization of such priests even against the priests' wishes.

Once a priest or bishop is laicized, they do not lose what is conferred to them through the graces imparted to them that relate to the sacrament of holy orders; therefore, sacraments—including the consecrating others as bishops in apostolic succession—which are performed by excommunicated, dismissed or laicized priests and bishops are considered valid but illicit (though they remain unrecognized by Rome).

== Eastern Orthodoxy ==
Certain Eastern Orthodox theologians believe that ordination to the priesthood does not confer an indelible character on the person's soul and that laicization could remove the ordained status completely. From the time of laicization all actions of a former cleric that would have been considered sacred are normally considered invalid.

Laicization of a cleric may come as a result of a request for removal from sacred orders, or as an ecclesiastical punishment. In the first case, very often, the cleric may ask to be laicized in order to enter a second marriage after the divorce or the death of his spouse. In this case, the man remains in good standing with the church but is no longer a cleric. Laicization of a bishop can only be done by the convening of a holy synod.

Forced laicization or removal from sacred orders is a form of ecclesiastical punishment, imposed by the ruling bishop of a cleric for certain transgressions. According to the canonical procedure, if the cleric is found guilty of an infringement of a sacred vow, unrepentant heresy, breaking of canon law or ecclesiastical discipline, he can be suspended from exercising all clerical functions. If, disregarding his suspension, he continues to liturgize or does not repent of his actions, he may be permanently deposed from the sacred orders (in common parlance, "laicized"). Strictly speaking, the deposition can be appealed at the ecclesiastical court, but, in modern practice, the bishop's decision is usually final.

Laicization as an ecclesiastical punishment may carry with it the excommunication of the former cleric from the church for a certain period, or indefinitely. The anathema, the permanent act of excommunication, against a member of the church or a former cleric is usually imposed by the decision of the synod of bishops or the ecclesiastical council. In such cases, this not only defrocks the former cleric but also banishes him from entering an Eastern Orthodox church, receiving the Eucharist and other sacraments, and being blessed by a priest.

== Anglicanism ==
In Anglicanism, defrocking is extremely rare and often impossible. According to the 39 Articles of Religion, even unworthy ministers can validly confect the sacraments (even after disciplinary action).

Different provinces in the Anglican Communion handle this differently; the canon law of the Church of England, for instance, states that "No person who has been admitted to the order of bishop, priest, or deacon can ever be divested of the character of his order..." though the church has processes to allow any clergy (by own volition or otherwise) to cease to function in the role. Anglican clergy are generally licensed to preach and administer sacraments by the bishop of the diocese in question; however if a bishop suspends this licence, the deacon or priest may no longer exercise their respective ministerial functions lawfully in that diocese. Within the Church of England the Clergy Discipline Measure 2003 provides for a range of sanctions up to a lifelong ban from the exercise of ministry.

Similarly, in the Anglican Church of Canada "deposition from the exercise of ministry if the person is ordained" does not amount to defrocking, but merely removes the right to the exercise of ministry by ordained persons. These powers are given to the diocesan bishop (in most cases) subject to appeal to a diocesan court, or the diocesan court may exercise primary jurisdiction when the bishop asks it to (for diocesan bishops the provincial metropolitan is given primary jurisdiction, for metropolitans the provincial House of Bishops is given jurisdiction, for the primate it is the national House of Bishops). All these powers are subject to appeal to courts of appeal and on matters of doctrine to the Supreme Court of the Anglican Church of Canada (Appendix 4, General Synod Canon XVIII - Discipline). General Synod 2007 clarified deposition, including forbidding the practice of suspending the licence in cases where discipline proceedings could be commenced instead (Resolution A082).

According to the constitutions and canons of the Episcopal Church in the United States, Title IV "Ecclesiastical Discipline", there are three modes of depriving a member of clergy from exercising ministerial rights: inhibition, suspension, or deposition. Inhibitions and suspensions are temporary. Clergy who are deposed are "deprived of the right to exercise the gifts and spiritual authority of God's word and sacraments conferred at ordination." (Title IV, Canon 15, Of Terminology Used in This Section, Deposition).

In the Anglican Church of Australia, the relevant canon provides for a bishop, priest or deacon to relinquish or be deposed from, or prohibited from functioning in, Holy Orders. Upon relinquishing or being deposed from Holy Orders, the relinquished or deposed person ceases to have any right, privilege or advantage attached to the relevant order(s) (of bishop, priest or deacon), and, if wholly relinquished or deposed, is considered, except for any Church law relating to a Church Tribunal, to be a lay person for the purposes of the Church. Where a person in Holy Orders has been prohibited from functioning, the prohibition has effect according to its terms.

== Methodism ==
In the United Methodist Church, when an elder, bishop, or deacon is defrocked, their ministerial credentials are removed. Defrocking is usually the result of blatantly disobeying the order and discipline of the United Methodist Church and violating biblical standards. A defrocked clergyman is prohibited from celebrating the sacraments (holy baptism and holy communion). A United Methodist elder or deacon may only have their credentials revoked through voluntary surrender or church trial. A minister who enters the status of honorable location retains their ordination credentials unless they voluntarily surrender them, while a minister who is involuntarily located may or may not, at the discretion of the Board of Ordained Ministry of their Annual Conference, retain their credentials of ordination. As a general rule, elders may only lose their credentials through voluntary surrender or action of a church court. Ministers who are found not competent to exercise their office may be suspended from ministry, but only for the duration of the incompetence. The United Methodist Book of Discipline outlines the specific rules for each option. Elders and deacons may not simply be defrocked by a bishop, but only through ecclesiastical due process.

== See also ==
- Cashiering
- Loss of clerical state
