= Diabolical rebaptism =

Supposed rebaptism of an individual in the name of the devil

Diabolical rebaptism is the supposed rebaptism of an individual in the name of the devil. It was a common accusation made against the accused at witch trials, but seems to have been essentially the invention of demonologists.
