= Indelible mark =

Indelible mark may refer to:

- Sacramental character, an indelible spiritual mark left by some sacraments according to Catholic theology
- the mark made by an indelible marker
- the mark left by indelible ink on the voter's forefinger during elections
