= Validity and liceity =

Concepts in the Catholic Church

Validity and liceity are concepts in the Catholic Church. Validity designates an action which produces the effects intended; an action which does not produce the effects intended is considered "invalid". Liceity designates an action which has been performed legitimately; an action which has not been performed legitimately is considered "illicit". Some actions can be illicit, but still be valid.

Catholic canon law also lays down rules for licit, also called lawful, placing of the act, along with criteria to determine its validity or invalidity. Valid but illicit or valid but illegal (Latin: valida sed illicita) is a description applied in the Catholic Church to describe either an unauthorized celebration of a sacrament or an improperly placed juridic act that nevertheless has effect. Validity is presumed whenever an act is performed by a qualified person and includes those things which essentially constitute the act itself as well as the formalities and requirements imposed by law for the validity of the act.

== Baptism ==
The 1983 Code of Canon Law states: "Except in a case of necessity, it is unlawful for anyone without due permission to confer baptism outside his own territory, not even upon his own subjects". In the Latin Church, administration of baptism is one of the functions especially entrusted to the parish priest.

However, according to the same Code, any person, even someone not baptized, can baptize, if he has the required intention. The intention required is to will to do what the Catholic Church does when she baptizes, and to apply the Trinitarian baptismal formula.

In 2008, the Congregation for the Doctrine of the Faith (CDF) stated the baptism formulae "I baptize you in the name of the Creator, and of the Redeemer, and of the Sanctifier" and "I baptize you in the name of the Creator, and of the Liberator, and of the Sustainer", were invalid.

In 2020, the CDF stated the formula "We baptize you in the name of the Father and of the Son and of the Holy Spirit" was invalid for the purposes of conferring baptism. This made it so Matthew Hood, a Catholic priest of Detroit who had been baptised by Mark Springer by this formula, was not considered a priest anymore (Hood was later properly baptised and ordained). This 2020 statement created other difficulties, as other people from Detroit had been baptised with the same formula by Springer, and other people had received sacraments from Hood since the latter's ordination 2017. Due to the same 2020 statement, another US priest, Andrés Arango, who had baptised using the same formula, had to properly baptise those he had invalidly baptised. Thomas Reese and retired sacramental theology Prof. Peter Fink have criticized the CDF statement, saying the "We" formula was valid.

== Confirmation ==
In the Latin Church, a bishop is the ordinary minister of confirmation and he may licitly administer it to his own subjects everywhere and, in his own territory, even to Catholics who are not his subjects, unless their ordinary has expressly forbidden it. In the Latin Catholic Church, simple priests (presbyters) can validly and licitly confirm in some circumstances, such as when they baptize adults or receive them into the church and when there is danger of death.

Priests of the Eastern Catholic Churches can validly confer the sacrament on any Catholic, even a Catholic of the Latin Church, but they can do so licitly only on those who belong to their own particular church and on other Catholics who meet the conditions of either being their subjects or of being lawfully baptized by them, or of being in danger of death.

== Eucharist ==
A prime example of valid but illicit celebration of a sacrament would be the use of leavened wheaten bread for the Eucharist in the Latin Church or in certain Eastern Catholic Churches. If, on the other hand, rice or rye flour are used instead of wheat, or if butter, honey, or eggs are added, particularly in large quantities, the Mass would be invalid (transubstantiation would not occur).

Likewise, wine used for the Eucharist must be valid. Invalid wine would be any wine made of non-grape fruits or wine mixed with any other substance apart from "a small quantity of water".

A priest who has been laicized, suspended, or excommunicated is not to say Mass, but if the Mass is said, it is considered valid but illicit.

== Penance ==
Church laws regarding confession require that priests who are hearing confessions must have valid faculties and jurisdiction. As penance is not only a sacramental act but also one of jurisdiction, such faculties are required for both for validity and liceity.

Those who are provided with the faculty of hearing confessions by reason of office or grant of a competent superior of a religious institute or society of apostolic life possess the same faculty everywhere by the law itself as regards members and others living day and night in the house of the institute or society. They also use the faculty licitly unless some major superior has denied it in a particular case as regards his own subjects.

Confessions in which the priest does not have the faculties to hear confession, yet without good reason pretends to have them, are valid but illicit. The church supplants the faculties leading to validity of the sacrament (canon 144).

Pope Francis allowed priests of the canonically irregular Society of Saint Pius X to hear confessions during the Year of Mercy, in 2015 and 2016; Pope Francis extended the concession indefinitely in the apostolic letter Misericordia et Misera of 20 November 2016.

== Anointing of the sick ==
Every priest can administer the sacrament of anointing of the sick validly. The duty and the right to administer it pertains to the priest to whom the spiritual care of the person concerned is entrusted. However, any other priest may administer it instead for a good reason if he has the presumed consent of the priest who has the duty and right.

== Holy orders ==
All bishops are able to ordain a deacon, priest, or bishop. In the sacrament of holy orders, a valid but illicit ordination, as the name suggests, is an ordination in which a bishop uses his valid ability to ordain someone a bishop without having first received the required authorization. The same would apply to a bishop's ordaining of a man who has not undergone and completed necessary seminary schooling, as required by canon law. The bishop is then acting in a manner deemed illicit or illegal.

A Latin or Eastern Catholic bishop who consecrates someone to the episcopate without a mandate from the pope is automatically excommunicated according to Catholic canon law, even if his ordination may be considered valid. The person who receives consecration from him is also automatically excommunicated. Pope Pius XII declared that the consecration of a bishop against the express orders of the Pope may be valid but is 'gravely illicit i.e. criminal and sacrilegious'. The excommunication can be lifted by only the Holy See. Notable, historic examples have been the consecrations of the bishops of the Old Catholic Union of Utrecht, initially by Dominique Marie Varlet.

In the 20th century, the excommunicated Carlos Duarte Costa illicitly consecrated Salomão Barbosa Ferraz, who would later join the Roman Church without being conditionally ordained.

Additionally, Archbishop Marcel Lefebvre was automatically excommunicated for his valid but illicit ordinations of four bishops for the SSPX without a papal mandate. After Lefebvre's death, the Holy See, on 21 January 2009, lifted the excommunication of the four bishops. However, the SSPX argues that he acted under grave necessity, which the 1983 canon law stipulates is an excuse to avoid automatic excommunication in this case (canon 1323, §4).

In the 21st century, Emmanuel Milingo was excommunicated for his conditional ordinations of Peter Paul Brennan and George Augustus Stallings; however, canon lawyers and Catholic university professors acknowledged their validity.

== Marriage ==
A marriage celebrated in due form but without express permission of the competent authority of the Catholic Church between a Catholic and another baptized person enrolled in a church or ecclesial community not in full communion with the Catholic Church is "prohibited" (illicit) but valid. On the other hand, a marriage celebrated in due form between a Catholic and an unbaptized person is invalid unless dispensation has previously been obtained from the competent church authority.

Other cases in which a marriage is both illicit and invalid are indicated in canons 1083 to 1094 of the 1983 Code of Canon Law.

== See also ==
- Valid but irregular
- Episcopi vagantes
- Independent Catholic churches
- Sedeprivationism
- Conditional sacrament
- Sacramental character
- Sacramental matter and form
- Ex opere operato
- Sacramental validity
