= Faculty (Catholic canon law) =

Permission required by a Catholic priest to lawfully act as priest

A faculty, in the canon law of the Roman Catholic Church, is an ecclesiastical right conferred on a subordinate, by a superior who enjoys jurisdiction in the external forum. These rights then allow the subordinate to act, in the external or internal forum, validly or lawfully, or at least safely.

== Classification ==
They may be classified by the object to which they relate:

- jurisdiction is granted to absolve from sins and ecclesiastical censures, to dispense in vows, in irregularities relating to the reception of orders, in matrimonial impediments;
- permission or licence is given to do something which would be otherwise forbidden, as the reading of prohibited books, saying two Masses on the same day; ordaining clerics under the prescribed age;
- to avoid worry and qualms of conscience a precautionary dispensation or permission is granted to proceed in certain cases in relation to which the opinions of theologians may not appear sufficiently well founded, as for instance, a matrimonial dispensation may be conceded as a precaution, when it is not certain that an impediment exists, or permission to anticipate at 2 p.m. the recitation of the Divine Office is granted to a person who is unwilling to accept the opinion that anticipation at that hour is lawful.

Secondly, faculties, by reason of their source, are Apostolic, episcopal, or regular. Faculties are styled Apostolic or papal when they proceed from the pope directly, or through the ordinary channels of the Roman Congregations. They are episcopal, if the power or privilege conferred proceeds from a diocesan bishop, by virtue of his own power or ordinary jurisdiction, as for instance, the faculties of the diocese, to hear confessions, say Mass, preach, etc., granted to priests who labour in the diocese for the salvation of souls. Faculties are regular when they proceed from superiors of the regular clergy by reason of their ordinary jurisdiction, or by virtue of extraordinary powers or privileges conceded to them by the Holy See.

Lastly, faculties are general or particular: general, when granted for indeterminate persons, though they may be limited by time; particular, when granted to designated persons or for particular cases. General faculties conceded to bishops and other ordinaries are also called indults. These indults are given for a definite period, e. g. five years (facultates quinquennales), or for a definite number of cases.

== History ==
The distance of dioceses from Rome, together with peculiar local conditions, rendered the granting of these general faculties a matter of necessity, and in 1637 certain new grants or lists of faculties were drawn up by the Sacred Congregation of the Holy Office. Since then, they have been communicated by the Holy See, through the Congregation of the Propagation of the Faith, to bishops, vicars and prefects Apostolic throughout the world, according to their various needs.
