= Sacramental validity =

Sacramental validity is a concept in Christianity relating to the validity of a sacrament. The major Christian denominations have various teaching on the validity of sacraments.

== Teaching by Christian denomination ==
=== Western Christianity ===
==== Roman Catholicism ====
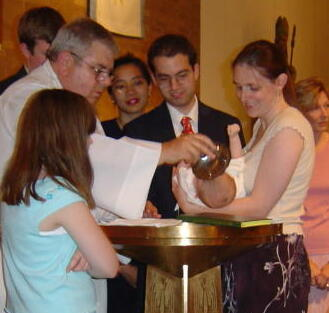
A Roman Catholic priest pours water on the head of an infant held over the baptismal font at Saint Patrick Catholic Church in Fredericksburg, Virginia

In the Roman Catholic Church, "For a Sacrament to be validly conferred (i.e., for the recipient to receive the inward grace it signifies), it is necessary for the Sacrament to be conferred using valid matter and form, together with the intention to do what the Church does." With respect to the intention of the individual administering the sacrament, the Council of Florence declared: "In a case of necessity not only a priest or a deacon but also a lay man or woman or even a pagan or a heretic have the power to baptize, provided that they observe the form prescribed by the Church and have the intention of doing what the Church does." Proper matter and form constitutes the formula used in the administration of the sacrament, as well as the action accompanying it.

The Catholic Church ordinarily recognizes as valid the baptisms of Christians of the Eastern Orthodox, Old Catholic, Polish National Catholic, Evangelical-Lutheran, Continental Reformed, Anglican, Congregationalist, Presbyterian, Methodist, Baptist, Brethren, Waldensian, and United Protestant denominations.

==== Evangelical-Lutheranism ====
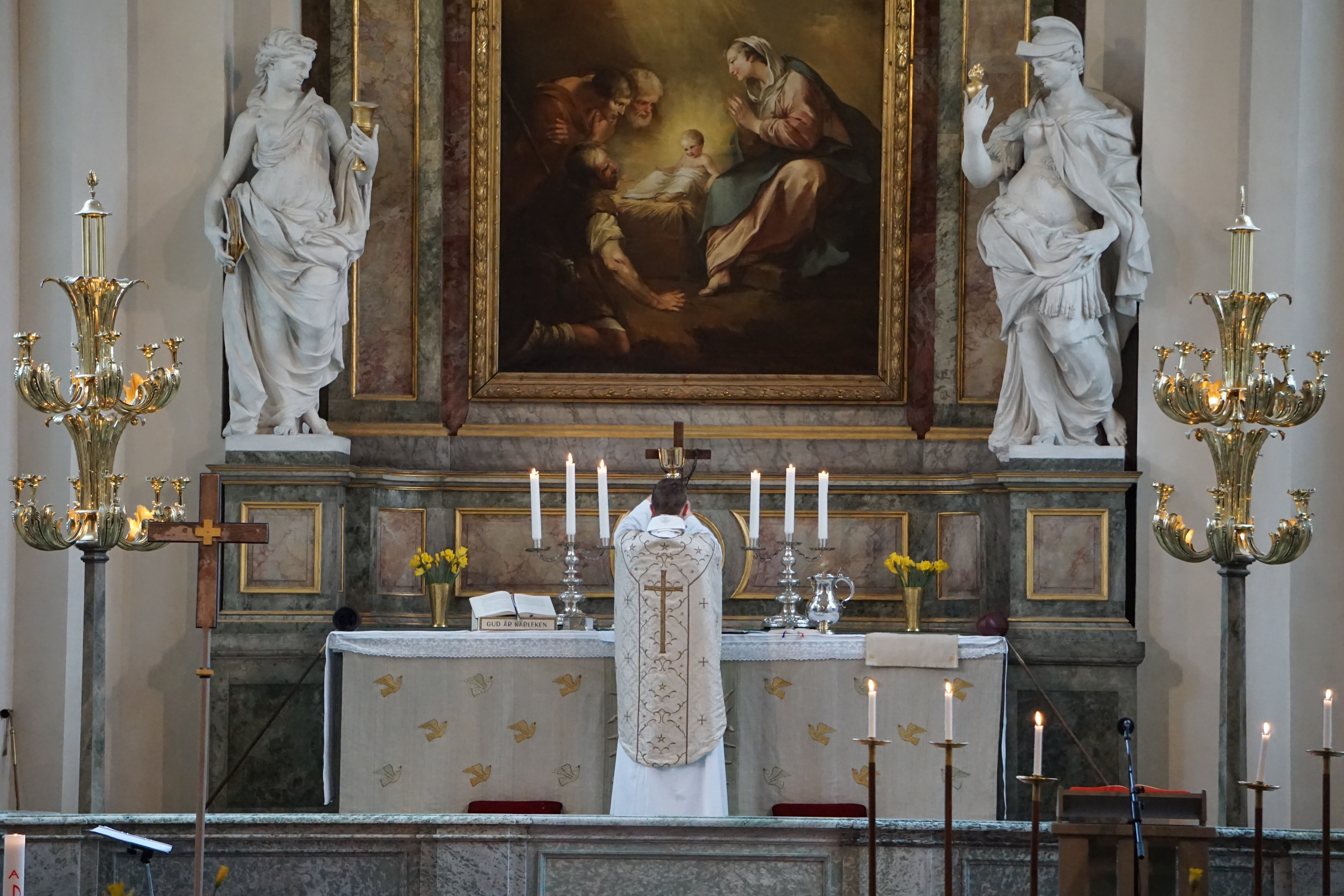
Evangelical-Lutheran priest elevating the chalice during the Mass at Maria Magdalena Church, Sweden

Though Evangelical-Lutherans are not dogmatic about the number of sacraments, three Lutheran sacraments are generally recognized including baptism, confession, and the eucharist.

In Evangelical-Lutheran theology, sacraments are "effective and valid in as much as they enacted the Word of God". Proper intent with regard to the external act contributes to sacramental validity as well, for example, the presider's intent to consecrate the "very body and blood of Christ" in the celebration of the Mass. This affects the recognition of sacramental validity in other Christian denominations, in view with the Evangelical Lutheran reading of Scripture as teaching the real presence of Christ in the Eucharist. As such, Evangelical-Lutherans recognize the celebration of the Eucharist in the Roman Catholic Church, Eastern Orthodox Churches and Oriental Orthodox Churches, but Evangelical-Lutherans do not recognize the sacramental validity of the Lord's Supper as it is celebrated in the Baptist Churches (who reject this Evangelical-Lutheran dogma of the corporeal presence).

==== Reformed (Continental Reformed, Presbyterian, Congregationalist, and Anglican) tradition ====
The Belgic Confession (1561) of the Continental Reformed Churches teaches that the sacraments are visible signs and seals instituted by God to confirm His promises to believers.

The Westminster Confession of the Presbyterian Churches and the Savoy Declaration of the Congregationalist Churches teaches: “The grace which is exhibited in or by the sacraments rightly used, is not conferred by any power in them; neither doth the efficacy of a sacrament depend upon the piety or intention of him that doth administer it: but upon the work of the Spirit, and the word of Institution, which contains, together with a precept authorizing the use thereof, a promise of benefit to worthy receivers.”

The Thirty-nine Articles of Religion of the Church of England, along with the Books of Homilies, form the doctrinal standard for historic Anglicanism. These were published under the direction of Thomas Cranmer, the guiding figure of the Protestant Reformation in England, who aligned himself with the Reformed theology of John Calvin. The Thirty-nine Articles of Religion teaches that sacramental validity does not hinge on the worthiness of the minister, but "because of Christ’s institution and promise". Broadly speaking, Anglicans, along with other Reformed Christians, hold that "eucharistic validity is recognized as being dependent on the correct use of Christ's words and deeds, and not on the special powers of some ordained minister." As such, God's Reign and Our Unity: The Report of the Anglican-Reformed International Commission holds that Anglicans recognize the sacramental validity of the eucharists of other Reformed Churches. Certain Anglican denominations of Anglo-Catholic churchmanship additionally teach that those celebrating the sacraments must be in "the unbroken succession of Orders".

==== Methodism ====
The father of Methodism, John Wesley, held that "the efficacy [of the sacraments] is derived, not from him that administers it, but from Him that ordains it".

==== Baptists ====
Baptists who uphold the doctrine of successionism believe that "only a true church—that is, a Baptist church—can legitimately celebrate the ordinances of baptism and the Lord's Supper. Any celebration of these ordinances by non-Baptists is invalid."

Baptists reject the validity of baptisms performed in Christian denominations that practice infant baptism, such as the Roman Catholic Church and the Evangelical-Lutheran Churches.

=== Eastern Christianity ===
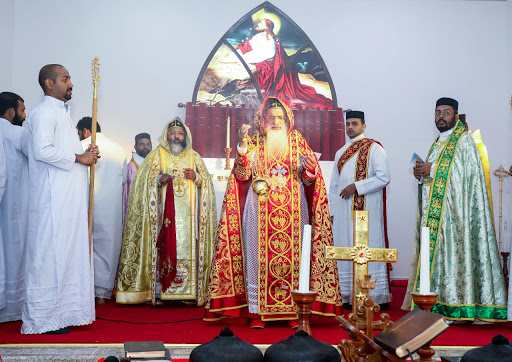
The celebration of the Holy Qurobo in a congregation of the Indian Orthodox Church.

==== Eastern Orthodox Churches ====
With respect to the validity of the sacrament of marriage, the Eastern Orthodox Church requires that marriages are to be celebrated by an Eastern Orthodox priest inside an Eastern Orthodox church.

The Eastern Orthodox Churches "does not speculate on grace outside of Orthodoxy" and so the validity of sacraments in other confessions is an "open question".

==== Oriental Orthodox Churches ====
In the Oriental Orthodox Churches, sacramental validity is contingent on three factors:

1. An adequate substance for the Sacrament like water for Baptism, bread and wine for the Sacrament of Communion, oil for the Unction of the Sick, and so on.
1. An ordained priest by the laying on of the apostolic hand.
1. Invocation of the Holy Spirit by the priest, by praying certain prayers for the dwelling of the Holy Spirit and sanctification of the Sacrament.

For sacraments to be valid in the Oriental Orthodox denominations, they must "administered correctly according to God's will, and the placement of the fathers guided by the Holy Spirit, and handed over by the Church and Holy Councils."

The Catholic Church recognizes the sacraments of the Oriental Orthodox Churches as valid.

== See also ==
- Catholic sacraments
- Lutheran sacraments
- Anglican sacraments
- Conditional sacrament
- Sacramental matter and form
