= Sacramental matter and form =

Catholic theology

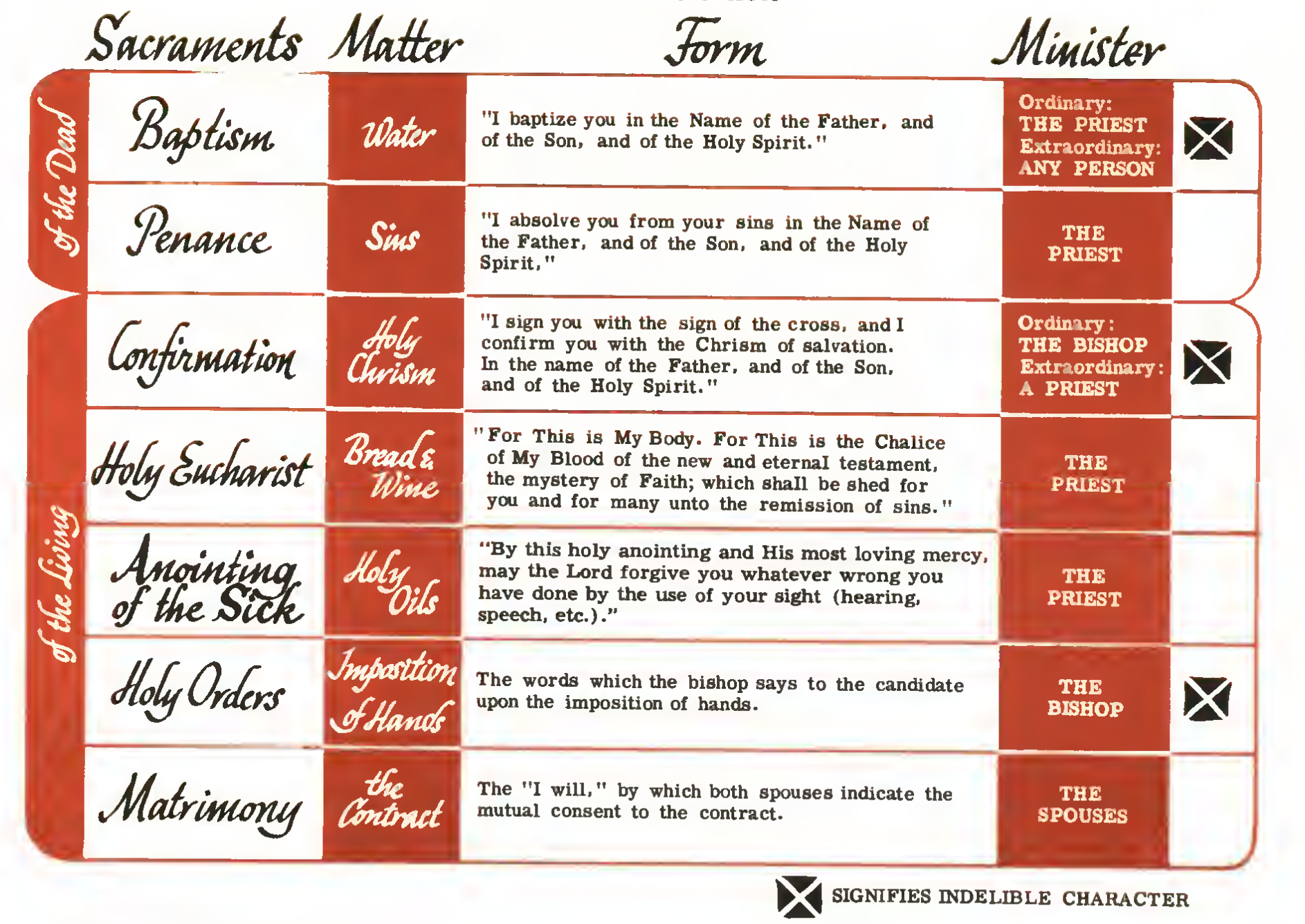
A chart from a children's catechism shows sacraments by form, matter, and minister.

According to Catholic theology, the sacraments of the Catholic Church can be described in their matter and form.

== Description ==
The terminology of form and matter to describe the sacraments seems to have been first proposed by William of Auxerre. However, the Catholic Encyclopedia states this conceptual view of the sacraments was already present in Augustine of Hippo's writings.

The Catechism of the Council of Trent explains this concept this way: "every Sacrament consists of two things; 'matter,' which is called the element, and 'form,' which is commonly called 'the word.'"

The matter of a sacrament is "that part of a sacrament with which or to which something is done in order to confer grace", "materials used and actions performed". The form of a sacrament consists of the words and the intention by which the sacrament is effected. For example, the matter for the sacrament of baptism is water. This matter is administered to a recipient along with the accompanying form, which is the Latin sentence "Ego te baptizo in nomine Patris, et Filii, et Spiritus Sancti", with the person pronouncing those words doing so with the proper intention.

According to Thomas Aquinas, the sacraments consist of the union of words and material things, just as in Christ, the author of the sacraments, who is the Word made flesh. Just as the flesh of Christ was sanctified and has the power to sanctify through the Word that is now united with it, so the sacramental elements are sanctified and acquire the power to sanctify through the words that are spoken during their celebration.

The Council of Florence stated that, to be valid, the sacrament must have three elements: the “right matter” (material sign), the “right formula” (words or mode of administration) and the “right intention” of the priest/bishop (willingness to do what the Church does).

=== Virtus instrumenti and virtus instrumentalis ===
Aquinas distinguished between virtus instrumenti and virtus instrumentalis (instrumental power). The first is the form owned by the sacramental matter (e. g. the water's form in the case of Baptism), while the second is the additional form donated by God (the principal agent) to the sacramental matter when the priest or bishop pronounces the sacramental formula.

Virtus instrumenti and virtus instrumentalis are similar to each other: just as water naturally possesses the power to cleanse the body of dirt (virtus instrumenti of the water), so too, after the pronouncement of the Trinitarian baptismal formula, water acquires from God the additional power to cleanse the soul of sin (virtus instrumentalis given by God). All sacramental matters have their own virtus instrumenti because, according to the Aristotle's hylomorphism, matter can't exist alone, without being united to a form. The sacramental virtus instrumentalis participate of the divine mystery, is a mystery by itself, and it is something that transcends time, so it is immutable and eternal.

The virtus instrumentalis or virtus effectiva is possessed only by the seven sacraments of the New Law and the New Covenant, while it is absent in those of the Old Testament. Accordingly, the Decree on the Sacraments in General, approved during the Seventh Session of the Council of Trent (March 3, 1547), at Canon 2 (DH 1602) states:

CANON II.-If any one saith, that these said sacraments of the New Law do not differ from the sacraments of the Old Law, save that the ceremonies are different, and different the outward rites; let him be anathema.

== Catholic directives ==
On 3 February 2024, the Dicastery for the Doctrine of the Faith released a note approved by Pope Francis named Gestis verbisque. This note states that the sacramental matters and forms cannot be changed at will, and that such changes may lead to the sacrament being null and thus not conferring grace to the person receiving the sacrament.

== See also ==
- Thomistic sacramental theology
- Validity and liceity (Catholic Church)
- Ex opere operato
