= Rebaptism =

Repeated baptism, common in various denominations for spiritual renewal

Rebaptism in Christianity is the baptism of a person who has previously been baptized, usually in association with a denomination that does not recognize the validity of the previous baptism. When a denomination rebaptizes members of another denomination, it is a sign of significant differences in theology. Churches that practice exclusive believer's baptism, including Baptists and Churches of Christ, rebaptize those who were baptized as infants because they do not consider infant baptism to be valid. However, churches from such denominations deny that they rebaptize because they do not recognize infant baptism as baptism at all.

Rebaptism is generally associated with:

- Anabaptism, from Greek ἀνα- (re-) and βαπτίζω (I baptize)
- Denominations that require believer's baptism, such as the Baptist churches
- Mormonism
- Oneness Pentecostal churches

== Catholic Church ==
The Catholic Church holds that rebaptism is not possible:

1272. Incorporated into Christ by Baptism, the person baptized is configured to Christ. Baptism seals the Christian with the indelible spiritual mark (character) of his belonging to Christ. No sin can erase this mark, even if sin prevents Baptism from bearing the fruits of salvation. Given once for all, Baptism cannot be repeated.

The baptisms of those to be received into the Catholic Church from other Christian communities are held to be valid if administered using the Trinitarian formula. As the Catechism of the Catholic Church states:

1256. The ordinary ministers of Baptism are the bishop and priest and, in the Latin Church, also the deacon. In case of necessity, anyone, even a non-baptized person, with the required intention, can baptize, by using the Trinitarian baptismal formula. The intention required is to will to do what the Church does when she baptizes. The Church finds the reason for this possibility in the universal saving will of God and the necessity of Baptism for salvation.
[...]
1284. In case of necessity, any person can baptize provided that he have the intention of doing that which the Church does and provided that he pours water on the candidate's head while saying: "I baptize you in the name of the Father, and of the Son, and of the Holy Spirit."

The 1983 Code of Canon Law addresses cases in which the validity of a person's baptism is in doubt:

Can. 869 §1. If there is a doubt whether a person has been baptized or whether baptism was conferred validly and the doubt remains after a serious investigation, baptism is to be conferred conditionally.

§2. Those baptized in a non-Catholic ecclesial community must not be baptized conditionally unless, after an examination of the matter and the form of the words used in the conferral of baptism and a consideration of the intention of the baptized adult and the minister of the baptism, a serious reason exists to doubt the validity of the baptism.

§3. If in the cases mentioned in §§1 and 2 the conferral or validity of the baptism remains doubtful, baptism is not to be conferred until after the doctrine of the sacrament of baptism is explained to the person to be baptized, if an adult, and the reasons of the doubtful validity of the baptism are explained to the person or, in the case of an infant, to the parents.

In cases where a valid baptism is performed subsequent to an invalid attempt, it is held that only one baptism actually occurred, namely the valid one. Thus baptism is never repeated.

== Eastern Orthodox Church ==
There are reports of instances where Eastern Orthodox churches re-baptize converts from Protestant and Catholic churches, though this varies from diocese to diocese. Within the OCA (Orthodox Church in America), converts are chrismated rather than rebaptized. In ROCOR (the Russian Orthodox Church Outside of Russia) and others, rebaptism does sometimes occur. Greek Orthodox practice changed in 1755, when Patriarch Cyril V of Constantinople issued the Definition of the Holy Church of Christ Defending the Holy Baptism Given from God, and Spitting upon the Baptisms of the Heretics Which Are Otherwise Administered; however, the Greek Orthodox do not currently insist on re-baptizing Catholics.

== Reformed tradition ==
The Reformed churches teach that "The sacrament of baptism is but once to be administered unto any person" (Westminster Confession of Faith Chapter 28, Paragraph 7). As such, an individual who was baptized using the Trinitarian formula in a Nicene Christian denomination can be received into the Reformed churches through a profession of faith. Those coming from religious groups outside Nicene Christianity, such as former members of The Church of Jesus Christ of Latter-day Saints, are rebaptized because the Reformed tradition holds that the Mormon baptism was invalid (the Reformed tradition does not view this as "rebaptism" but as the individual receiving the sacrament of "baptism" for the first time).

== Anabaptists ==
Anabaptists believe that baptism is only valid once the recipient has full faith in Christ and requests to be baptized. They reject infant baptism, deeming it to be invalid.

== Restorationist movements ==
Latter Day Saints practice rebaptism, as they believe that the priesthood authority to perform baptisms resides in their church only. However, the term rebaptism in The Church of Jesus Christ of Latter-day Saints is more commonly used to refer to baptism of previous members of the church who were excommunicated or had resigned their membership and are rejoining the church in full fellowship.

Jehovah's Witnesses do not recognize previous baptisms conducted by any other denomination.

Seventh Day Adventists routinely rebaptize persons who observed the Sabbath on the first day of the week (which they consider to be the wrong day), and now decide to keep the seventh day as Sabbath, and also those who turned from God into open sin but now wish to reenter church membership and fellowship.
