= Ex opere operato =

Doctrine that a sacrament acts in its own right

Ex opere operato is a Latin phrase meaning "from the work worked" that, in reference to sacraments, signifies that they derive their efficacy not from the minister (which would mean that they derive it ex opere operantis, meaning "from the work of the worker"), nor from the recipient, but—independently of the merits of either—from the sacrament itself. According to the ex opere operato interpretation of the sacraments, any positive effect comes not from any human worthiness or faith, but from the sacrament as an instrument of God.

In the words of Dominican priest Jorge Scampini, S.T.M., "Affirming the ex opere operato efficacy means being sure of God's sovereign and gratuitous intervention in the sacraments." For example, in confirmation the Holy Spirit is bestowed neither through the attitude of the bishop nor that of the person being confirmed, but freely, by God, through the instrumentality of the sacrament. However, in order to receive sacraments fruitfully, it is believed necessary for the recipient to have faith.

== Antiquity ==
In Antiquity, the idea led to a schism among the Donatist Christians. The Donatists held that "one of the three bishops who had consecrated Caecilian was a traditor", and therefore Caecilian's consecration was invalid. Furthermore, they held "that the validity of such an act depended on the worthiness of the bishop performing it" and Caecilian and his followers "responded that the validity of the sacraments and of other such acts cannot be made to depend on the worthiness of the one administering them, for in that case all Christians would be in constant doubt regarding the validity of their own baptism or of the Communion of which they had partaken."

== Origin of the expression ==
The expression opus operatum is first found in the writings of Peter of Poitiers (1125–1205).

== In the Roman Catholic Church ==
According to the teaching of the Roman Catholic Church, to receive the fruits of the sacraments requires that a person be properly disposed. This means the efficacy of grace via the sacraments is not automatic. There must be, at least in the case of an adult, an openness to use the sufficient grace which is available in a sacrament. When the recipient is properly disposed, "the sacraments are instrumental causes of grace."

=== Biblical basis of the sacraments ===
The sacraments work ex opere operato as manifestations of Jesus' actions and words during his life. Baptism and Confirmation are the manifestation of Jesus' baptism by John the Baptist and anointing by the Holy Spirit, Holy Orders is the manifestation of Jesus' calling of the twelve Apostles, Matrimony is the manifestation of the Wedding at Cana, Anointing of the Sick is the manifestation of Jesus' miracles, Confession is the manifestation of Jesus' forgiveness of sins, and the Eucharist is the manifestation of the Last Supper and Paschal Mystery.

=== Sacramentals ===
The teaching of the Roman Catholic Church regarding sacramentals is their efficacy comes ex opere operantis Ecclesiae (i.e., from what the doer, the Church, does), not ex opere operato (from what is done): i.e., as the Second Vatican Council said, “they signify effects, particularly of a spiritual kind, which are obtained through the Church's intercession”. They “do not confer the grace of the Holy Spirit in the way that the sacraments do, but by the Church's prayer they prepare us to receive grace and dispose us to cooperate with it”. Sacramentals dispose the soul to receive grace and may remit venial sins when used prayerfully.

== In the Lutheran churches ==
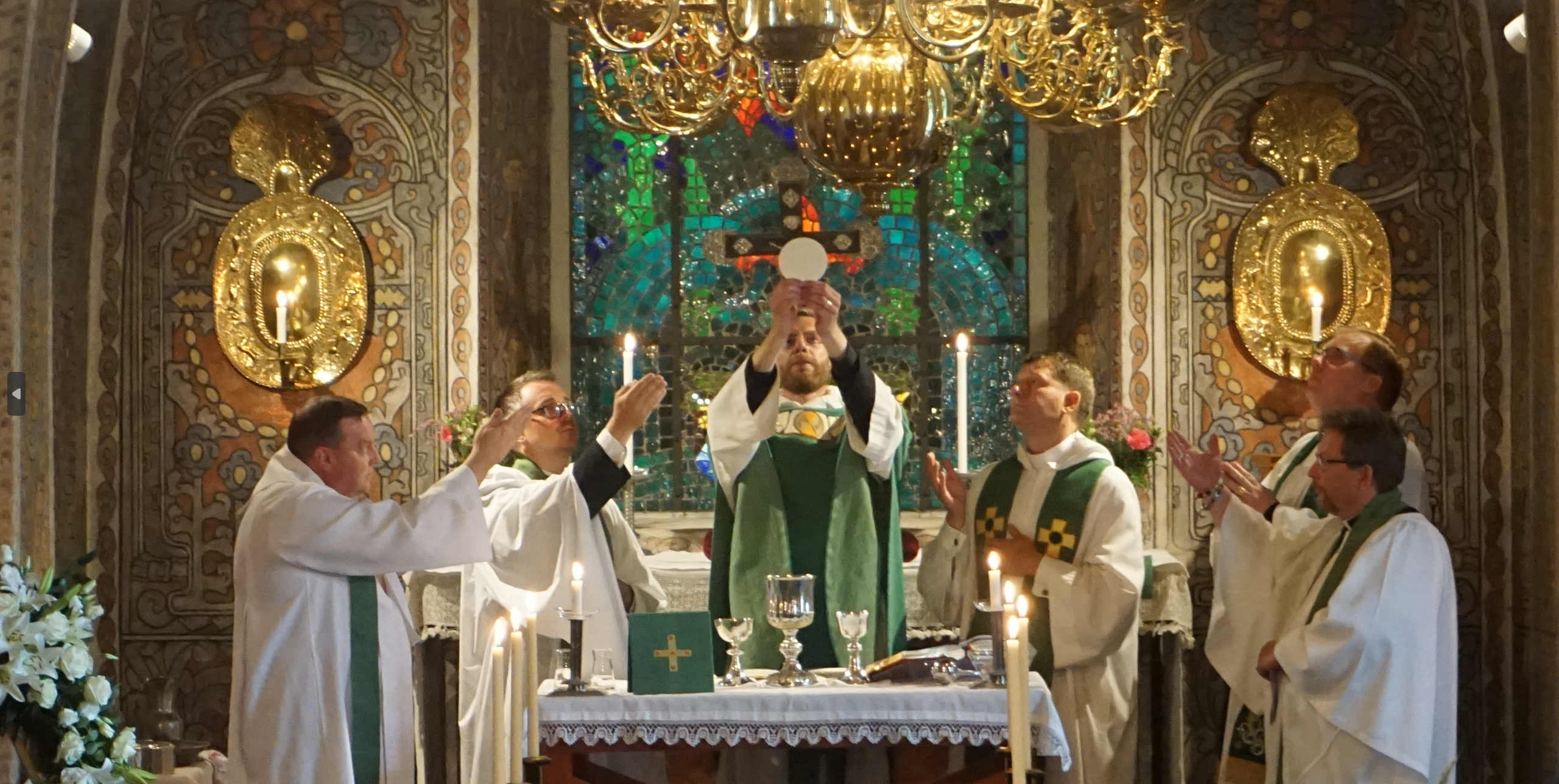
Lutheran priest elevating the host during the Mass at Alsike Church, Sweden

The Lutheran churches see as sacraments: baptism, the eucharist, as well as confession and absolution.

The Sacraments are efficacious, even if they be administered by wicked ministers, because the ministers officiate in the stead of Christ and do not represent their own person. —Augsburg Confession

Lutherans teach that through the sacrament of baptism, the soul is cleansed of original sin and bestowed salvific grace. The Lutheran churches affirm the real presence of Christ in the Eucharist and hold that the Mass is a sacrifice of thanksgiving and praise.

We thus conclude and declare that even if a bad and vicious man should take or distribute the Lord's Supper, he yet takes the true Sacrament, i.e., the body and blood of Christ, not less than the man who takes or distributes it in the most worthy manner. For this Sacrament is not founded on the holiness of man, but on the Word of God. —Formula of Concord

In the Lutheran sacrament of confession and absolution, the priest pronounces forgiveness on the penitent in persona Christi and through these words, the believer receives "grace and forgiveness".

The Lutheran doctrine is distinguished from the Roman Catholic doctrine:

The Sacraments do not belong to the man who dispenses them, but to God, in whose name they are dispensed, and therefore the gracious efficacy and operation of the Sacrament depends on God alone, 1 Cor. 3:5, and not on the character or quality of the minister. The dispute about the intention of the minister is more intricate. Propriety requires that he who administers the Sacrament should bring to the altar a good intention of performing what God has commanded and instituted: a mind not wandering but collected and fixed. It is absolutely necessary that the intention of Christ be observed in the external act. I say in the external act, for the intention of the minister to perform the internal act is not necessary; that is performed by the church. On the other hand, the Church of Rome teaches that the intention of the minister is necessary to the integrity, verity, and efficacy of the Sacrament; that this intention has respect not only to the external act of administering the Sacrament according to the form of the institution, but to the design and effect of the Sacrament itself. — Quenstedt (IV, 74)

The Lutheran doctrine is distinguished from Reformed doctrine:

It is Lutheran doctrine that regeneration (the new birth) comes through baptism. ... the baptized are considered saved. Presbyterians take a slightly different approach. The Westminster Confession also says that "the grace promised" in baptism (which includes regeneration) "is not only offered, but really exhibited, and conferred, by the Holy Ghost, to such (whether of age or infants) as that grace belongs unto, according to the counsel of God's own will, in his appointed time." (WCF 28.6) Therefore, we would agree that baptism is indeed the outward means that God uses to communicate the grace of regeneration—though we would insist that it is properly received only by faith.

== In other Christian traditions ==
In Anglicanism, the impiety of the minister does not invalidate the sacrament, but faith and repentance is required by the receiver. Article XXVI of the Thirty-Nine Articles (Of the unworthiness of ministers which hinders not the effect of the Sacrament) states that the ministration of the Word (scripture) and sacraments is not done in the name of the priest or minister and that the efficacy of Christ's sacraments is not taken away by the wickedness of the clergy in them who by faith worthily and rightly receive the sacraments. This is because sacraments have their efficacy due to Christ's promise to his church.

Likewise, the Westminster Confession, states in Chapter 27, Art. 3: “The grace which is exhibited in or by the sacraments rightly used, is not conferred by any power in them; neither doth the efficacy of a sacrament depend upon the piety or intention of him that doth administer it: but upon the work of the Spirit, and the word of institution, which contains, together with a precept authorizing the use thereof, a promise of benefit to worthy receivers.”

However, Reformed confessions (such as the Westminster Confession) reject the ex opera operato effect of sacraments, since grace is received through faith. Sacraments are means to strengthen faith, not instruments to bestow Divine grace. Westminster Confession, Chapter 29, Art. 7: "Worthy receivers, outwardly partaking of the visible elements in this sacrament, do then also inwardly by faith, really and indeed, yet not carnally and corporally, but spiritually, receive and feed upon Christ crucified, and all benefits of his death: the body and blood of Christ being then not corporally or carnally in, with, or under the bread and wine; yet as really, but spiritually, present to the faith of believers in that ordinance, as the elements themselves are, to their outward senses."

The Heidelberg Catechism (1563) defines sacraments as signs and seals of Gods promise. It relates grace, faith and sacrament in this way: "Q & A 66 Q. What are sacraments?A. Sacraments are visible, holy signs and seals. They were instituted by God so that by our use of them he might make us understand more clearly the promise of the gospel, and seal that promise. And this is God’s gospel promise: to grant us forgiveness of sins and eternal life by grace because of Christ’s one sacrifice accomplished on the cross. Q & A 67 Q. Are both the word and the sacraments then intended to focus our faith on the sacrifice of Jesus Christ on the cross as the only ground of our salvation? A. Yes! In the gospel the Holy Spirit teaches us and by the holy sacraments confirms that our entire salvation rests on Christ’s one sacrifice for us on the cross."

== See also ==
- Augustine of Hippo
- List of Latin phrases
- Conditional sacrament
