= Sacraments of the Catholic Church =

Catholic visible rites

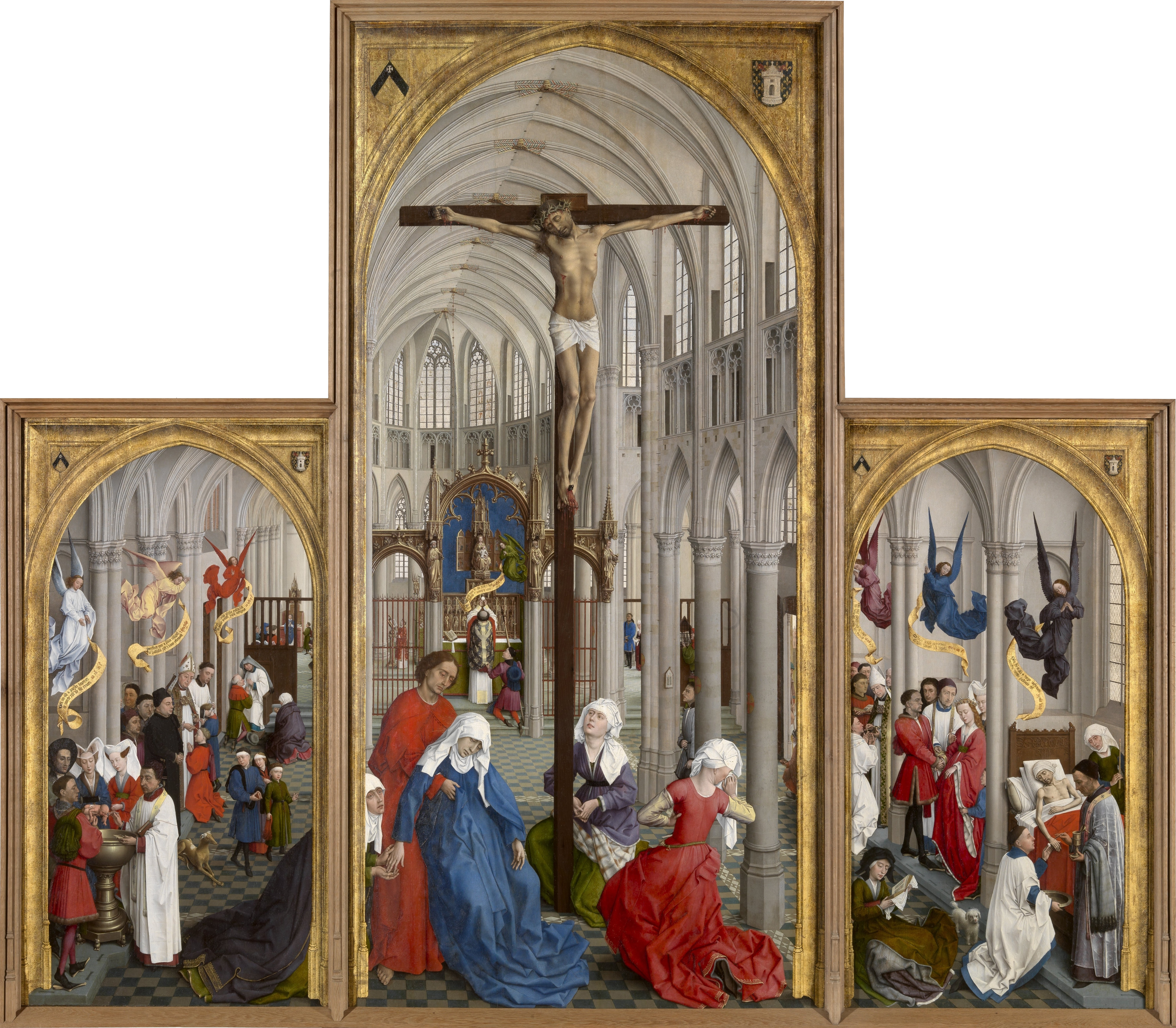
Seven Sacraments Altarpiece by Rogier van der Weyden, c. 1448

There are seven sacraments in the Catholic Church, which according to Catholic theology were instituted by Jesus Christ and entrusted to the Church. Sacraments are visible rites seen as signs and efficacious channels of the grace of God to all those who receive them with the proper disposition.

The sacraments are often classified into three categories: the sacraments of initiation (into the Catholic Church and the mystical body of Christ), consisting of baptism, confirmation, and the eucharist; the sacraments of healing, consisting of penance and the anointing of the sick; and the sacraments of service: holy orders and matrimony. Furthermore, baptism and penance were also known as the "sacraments of the dead" (in the meaning that the souls of the sinners which are regarded dead before God may obtain life through these sacraments), whereas the other five are collectively the "sacraments of the living".

== Enumeration ==
=== History ===
The number of the sacraments in the early church was variable and undefined; Peter Damian for example had listed eleven, including the ordination of kings. Hugh of Saint Victor enumerated nearly thirty, although he put baptism and Holy Communion first with special relevance. The current seven sacraments were set out in the Sentences by Peter Lombard, and these seven were confirmed by the Fourth Council of the Lateran in 1215.

=== Current ===
The Catechism of the Catholic Church lists the sacraments as follows: "The whole liturgical life of the Church revolves around the Eucharistic sacrifice and the sacraments. There are seven sacraments in the Church: baptism, confirmation or Chrismation, Eucharist, penance, anointing of the sick, holy orders, and matrimony."

The list of seven sacraments already given by the Council of Florence (1439) was reaffirmed by the Council of Trent (1545–1563), which stated:

CANON I.- If any one saith, that the sacraments of the New Law were not all instituted by Jesus Christ, our Lord; or that they are more, or less, than seven, to wit, Baptism, Confirmation, the Eucharist, Penance, Extreme Unction, Order, and Matrimony; or even that any one of these seven is not truly and properly a sacrament; let him be anathema.

CANON IV.- If any one saith, that the sacraments of the New Law are not necessary unto salvation, but superfluous; and that, without them, or without the desire thereof, men obtain of God, through faith alone, the grace of justification; – though all (the sacraments) are not necessary for every individual; let him be anathema.

== Dogmatic aspects ==
"Sacred tradition and Sacred Scripture form one sacred deposit of the word of God, committed to the Church." "In the liturgy, above all that of the sacraments, there is an immutable part, a part that is divinely instituted and of which the Church is the guardian, and parts that can be changed, which the Church has the power and on occasion also the duty to adapt to the cultures of recently evangelized peoples." Baptism cannot be changed to allow a non-Trinitarian formula. "Anyone conscious of a grave sin must receive the sacrament of Reconciliation before coming to communion." Regarding marriage, "basing itself on Sacred Scripture, which presents homosexual acts as acts of grave depravity, tradition has always declared that 'homosexual acts are intrinsically disordered' [...] contrary to the natural law." "The ordination of women is not possible."

The efficacy of sacraments does not depend on the celebrant's being in the state of grace. Their power comes not from the celebrant nor from the recipient but from God, and it is held that Christ himself is at work in the sacraments. However, the actual effects ("the fruits") of the sacrament depends also on the recipient's disposition: "in order that the liturgy may be able to produce its full effects, it is necessary that the faithful come to it with proper dispositions, that their minds should be attuned to their voices, and that they should cooperate with divine grace lest they receive it in vain".

== Faith and grace ==
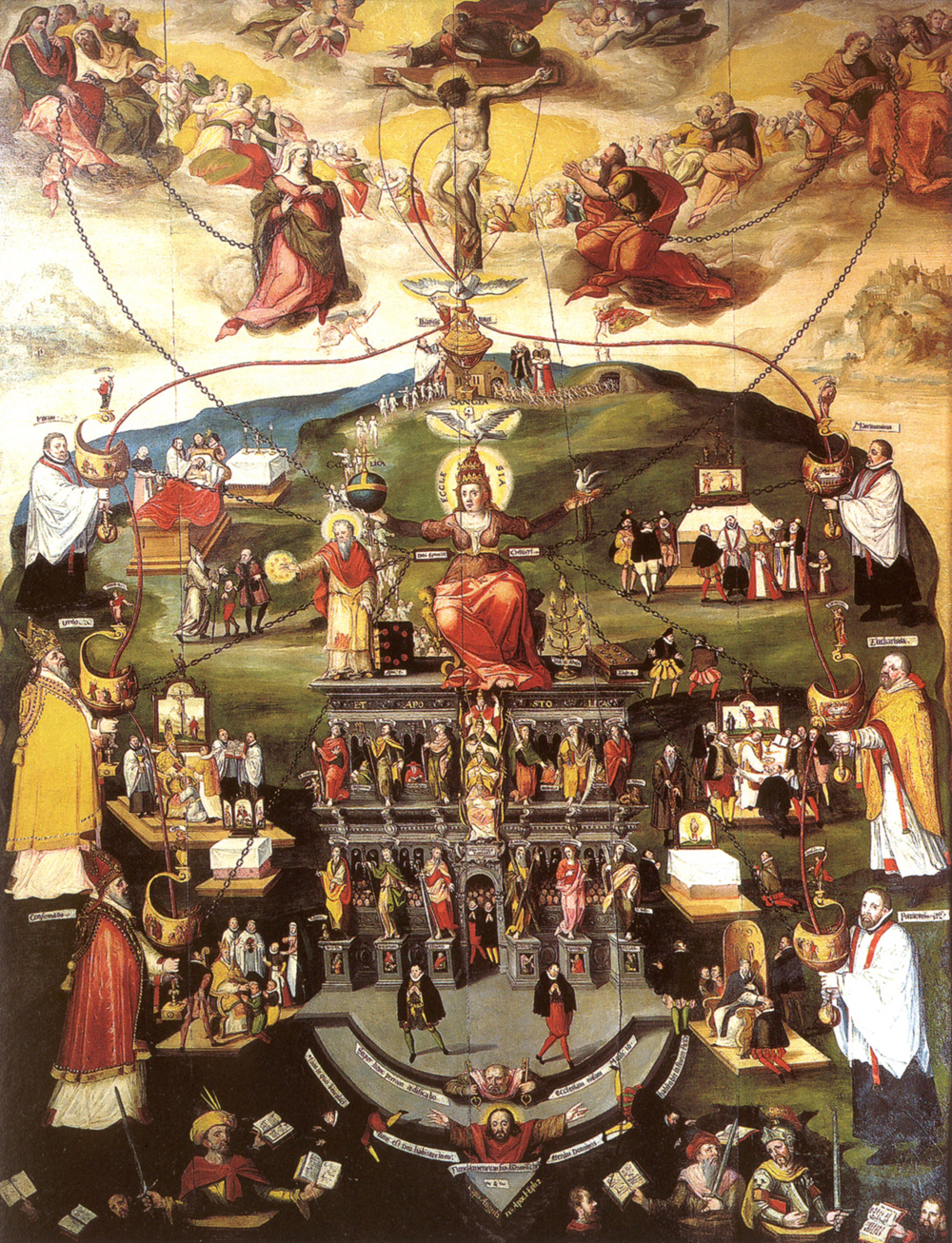
Distribution of divine graces by the Church through the sacraments. In the center the personification of Ecclesia with the (papal) tiara; above her baptism, from which streams of grace proceed; at the right marriage, eucharist, confession; at the left anointing of the sick, holy orders, confirmation (Johannes Hopffe, Wrisberg epitaph, Hildesheim, before 1615)

The Catholic Church teaches that the sacraments are "efficacious signs of grace, instituted by Christ and entrusted to the Church, by which divine life is dispensed to us". The sacraments presuppose faith and, through their words and ritual elements, they also nourish, strengthen and give expression to it.

The church teaches that the effect of a sacrament comes ex opere operato, by the very fact of being administered, regardless of the personal holiness of the minister administering it. However, a recipient's own lack of proper disposition to receive the grace conveyed can block the effectiveness of the sacrament in that person.

While the church itself is the universal sacrament of salvation, the sacraments of the Catholic Church in the strict sense are seven sacraments that "touch all the stages and all the important moments of Christian life: they give birth and increase, healing and mission to the Christian's life of faith". "The Church affirms that for believers the sacraments of the New Covenant are necessary for salvation", although not all are necessary for every individual.

== Sacraments of initiation ==
The Compendium of the Catechism of the Catholic Church states:

"Christian initiation is accomplished by means of the sacraments which establish the foundations of Christian life. The faithful born anew by Baptism are strengthened by Confirmation and are then nourished by the Eucharist."

The Catechism of the Catholic Church says:

"In the Eastern rites the Christian initiation of infants also begins with Baptism followed immediately by Confirmation (Chrismation) and the Eucharist, while in the Roman rite it is followed by years of catechesis before being completed later by Confirmation and the Eucharist, the summit of their Christian initiation" (CCC 1233).

Again in the Acts of the Apostles, baptism, laying on of the hands (confirmation/chrismation) and Breaking of the Bread are administered to the faithful within a short span of time (Acts 2: 42; 8:14; 19:6). The Eastern Churches followed the sacraments of initiation from early days. Latin Church, though administered the three sacraments—baptism, confirmation and Eucharist—separately, they retained the idea of unity of these sacraments. Thus CCC 1233 implies that the Christian initiation is completed by years long preparation in the Latin Church. Many of the Eastern Churches have restored their original tradition of Christian initiation which they lost due to Latinization.

=== Baptism ===
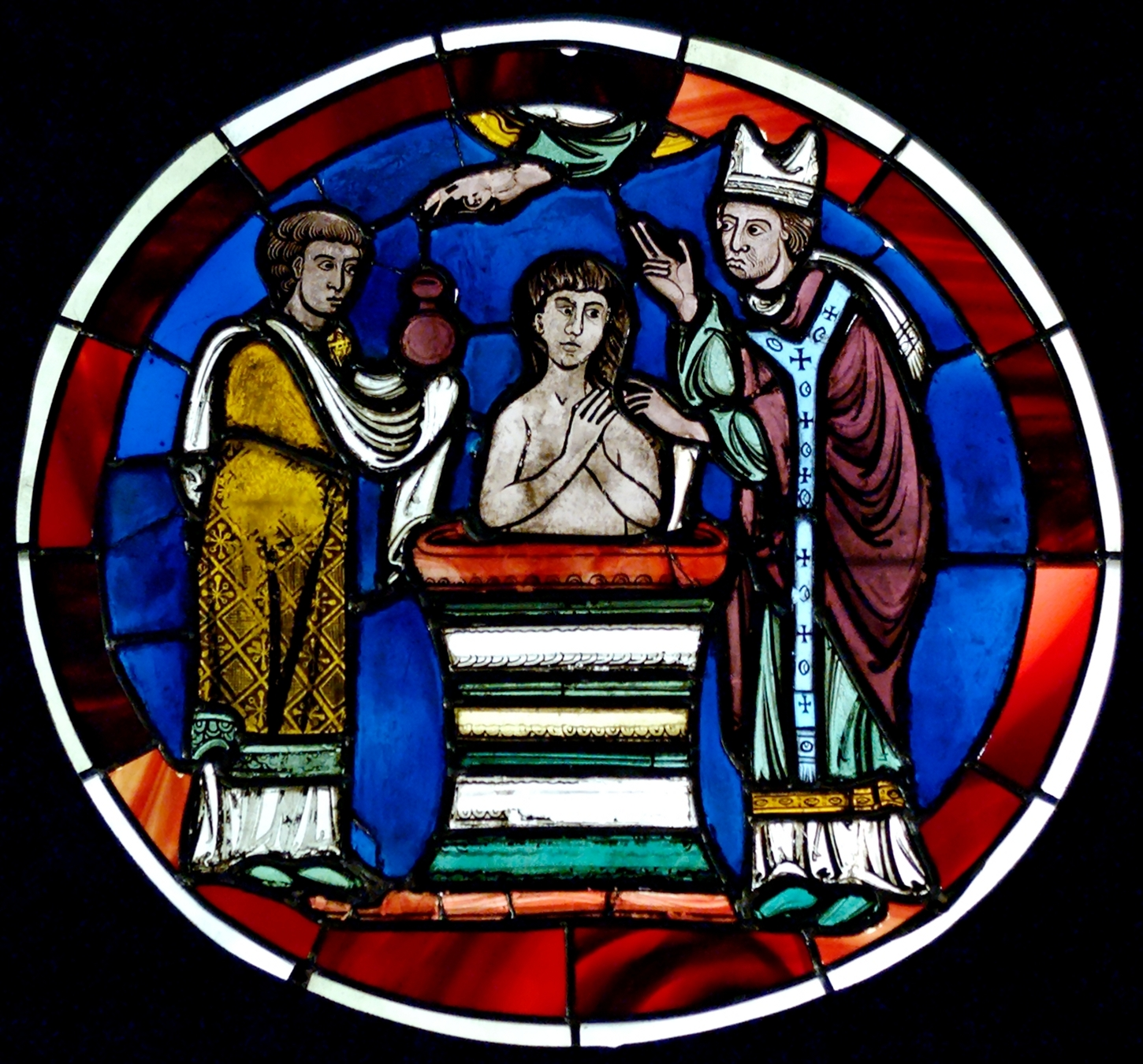
Scene of baptism. Stained glass, Paris, last quarter of the 12th century. From the Sainte-Chapelle of Paris.

The Catholic Church sees baptism as the first and basic sacrament of Christian initiation. In the Western or Latin Church, baptism is usually conferred today by pouring water three times on the recipient's head, while reciting the baptismal formula: "I baptize you in the name of the Father and of the Son and of the Holy Spirit" (cf. Matthew 28:19). In the Eastern Catholic Churches of Byzantine Rite immersion or submersion is used, and the formula is: "The servant of God, N., is baptized in the name of the Father, and of the Son, and of the Holy Spirit." Though sprinkling is not normally used, its validity is accepted, provided that the water flows over the skin, since otherwise it is not a washing. The Catholic Church teaches that baptism is the foundational sacrament of Christian initiation, instituted by Christ to cleanse individuals from original sin and incorporate them into the church. According to Catholic doctrine, original sin originated with Adam and Eve's disobedience in the Garden of Eden, which resulted in a fallen human nature transmitted to all their descendants. This state of original sin is not a personal fault but a condition inherited by all humans, as affirmed in the Catechism of the Catholic Church: "By yielding to the tempter, Adam and Eve committed a personal sin, but this sin affected the human nature that they would then transmit in a fallen state. It is a sin which will be transmitted by propagation to all mankind, that is, by the transmission of a human nature deprived of original holiness and justice."

=== Confirmation ===
Confirmation or Chrismation is the second sacrament of Christian initiation. "It is called Chrismation (in the Eastern Churches: anointing with holy myron or chrism) because the essential rite of the sacrament is anointing with chrism. It is called confirmation because it confirms and strengthens baptismal grace." It is conferred by "the anointing with Sacred Chrism (oil mixed with balsam and consecrated by the bishop), which is done by the laying on of the hand of the minister who pronounces the sacramental words proper to the rite." These words, in both their Western and Eastern variants, refer to a gift of the Holy Spirit that marks the recipient as with a seal. Through the sacrament the grace given in baptism is "strengthened and deepened." Like baptism, confirmation may be received only once, and the recipient must be in a state of grace (meaning free from any known unconfessed mortal sin) in order to receive its effects. The "originating" minister of the sacrament is a validly consecrated bishop; if a priest (a "presbyter") confers the sacrament – as is done ordinarily in the Eastern Churches and in special cases (such as the baptism of an adult or in danger of the death of a young child) in the Latin Church (CCC 1312–1313) – the link with the higher order is indicated by the use of oil (known as "chrism" or "myron") blessed by the bishop on Holy Thursday itself or on a day close to it. In the East, which retains the ancient practice, the sacrament is administered by the parish priest immediately after baptism. In the West, where the sacrament is normally reserved for those who can understand its significance, it came to be postponed until the recipient's early adulthood; in the 20th century, after Pope Pius X introduced first Communion for children on reaching the age of discretion, the practice of receiving confirmation later than the Eucharist became widespread; but the traditional order, with confirmation administered before First Communion, is being increasingly restored.

=== Eucharist ===
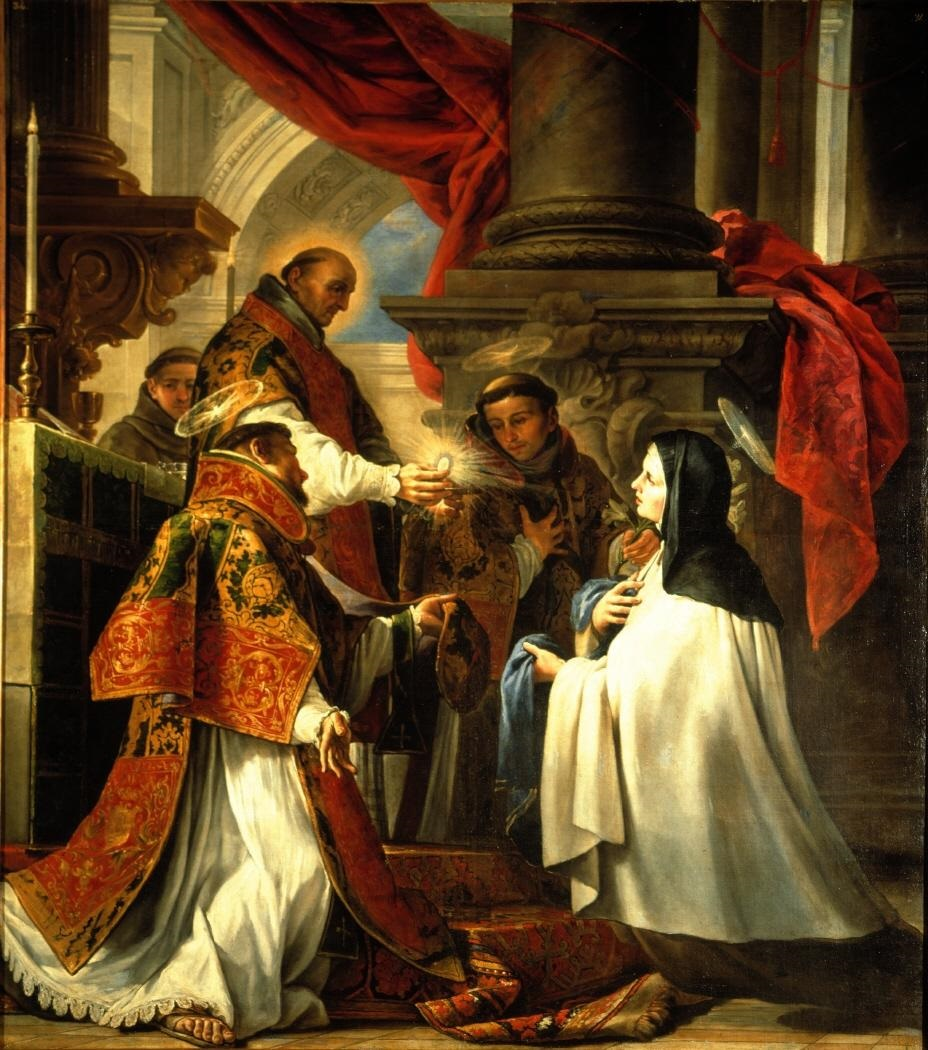
Communion of Saint Teresa, by Juan Martín Cabezalero, Museum of Lázaro Galdiano, Madrid

The Eucharist, also called the Blessed Sacrament, is the sacrament – the third of Christian initiation, the one that the Catechism of the Catholic Church says "completes Christian initiation" – by which Catholics partake of the Body and Blood of Jesus Christ and participate in the Eucharistic memorial of his one sacrifice. The first of these two aspects of the sacrament is also called Holy Communion. The bread – which must be wheaten, and which is unleavened in the Latin, Armenian and Ethiopic Rites, but is leavened in most Eastern Rites – and wine – which must be from grapes – used in the Eucharistic rite are, in Catholic faith, transformed in their inner reality, though not in appearance, into the Body and Blood of Christ, a change that is called transubstantiation. "The minister who is able to confect the sacrament of the Eucharist in the person of Christ is a validly ordained priest alone." The word "priest" here (in Latin sacerdos) includes both bishops and those priests who are also called presbyters. Deacons as well as priests (sacerdotes) are ordinary ministers of Holy Communion, and lay people may be authorized to act as extraordinary ministers of Holy Communion. The Eucharistic celebration is seen as "the source and summit" of Christian living, the high point of God's sanctifying action on the faithful and of their worship of God, the point of contact between them and the liturgy of heaven. So important is it that participation in the Eucharistic celebration (see Mass) is seen as obligatory on every Sunday and holy day of obligation and is recommended on other days. Also recommended for those who participate in the Mass is reception, with the proper dispositions, of Holy Communion. This is seen as obligatory at least once a year, during Eastertide.

=== Restored order of initiation ===
During the second half of the 2010s some dioceses of Latin Church in the United States, as elsewhere, returned to the original order of the three sacraments of Christian initiation, that is: baptism, confirmation and, lastly, first Communion.

The Catechism of the Catholic Church references this order at No. 1212, and at No. 1322 says: "The holy Eucharist completes Christian initiation.".

Administering the Eucharist before confirmation began in the Latin Church, unlike other Christian bodies, due to Pope Pius X's 1910 decree Quam singulari Christus amore (transl.: "How special was Christ's love"), which said Communion should not be delayed beyond when a child reaches the age of reason. U.S. dioceses complied but did not bring confirmation forward with it from a subsequent age.

== Sacraments of healing ==
=== Penance ===
The sacrament of penance (or Reconciliation) is the first of two sacraments of healing. The Catechism of the Catholic Church mentions in the following order and capitalization different names of the sacrament, calling it the sacrament of conversion, penance, confession, forgiveness and Reconciliation. It is the sacrament of spiritual healing of a baptized person from the distancing from God resulting from sins committed. When people sin after baptism, they cannot have baptism as a remedy; baptism, which is a spiritual regeneration, cannot be given a second time.

The sacrament involves four elements:

1. Contrition (the penitent's sincere remorse for wrongdoing or sin, repentance, without which the rite has no effect);
2. Confession to a priest who has the faculty to hear confessions (Canon 966.1) – while it may be spiritually helpful to confess to another, only a priest has the power to administer the sacrament;
3. Absolution by the priest; and,
4. Satisfaction or penance.

"Many sins wrong our neighbour. One must do what is possible in order to repair the harm (e.g., return stolen goods, restore the reputation of someone slandered, pay compensation for injuries). Simple justice requires as much. But sin also injures and weakens the sinner himself, as well as his relationships with God and neighbour. Absolution takes away sin, but it does not remedy all the disorders sin has caused. Raised up from sin, the sinner must still recover his full spiritual health by doing something more to make amends for the sin: he must 'make satisfaction for' or 'expiate' his sins. This satisfaction is also called 'penance'" (CCC 1459). In early Christian centuries, this element of satisfaction was quite onerous and generally preceded absolution, but now it usually involves a simple task for the penitent to perform later, in order to make some reparation and as a medicinal means of strengthening against further temptation.

The priest is bound by the "seal of confession", which is inviolable. "Accordingly, it is absolutely wrong for a confessor in any way to betray the penitent, for any reason whatsoever, whether by word or in any other fashion." A confessor who directly violates the sacramental seal incurs an automatic excommunication whose lifting is reserved to the Holy See.

In some dioceses, certain sins are "reserved" which means only certain confessors can absolve them. Some sins, such as violation of the sacramental seal, consecration of bishops without authorization by the Holy See, direct physical attacks on the Pope, and intentional desecration of the Eucharist are reserved to the Holy See. A special case-by-case faculty from the Sacred Penitentiary is normally required to absolve these sins.

=== Anointing of the Sick ===
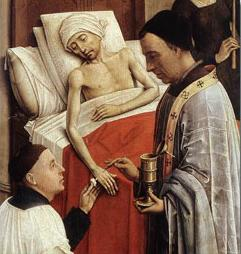
Extreme Unction, from Rogier van der Weyden's altarpiece

Anointing of the Sick is the second sacrament of healing. In this sacrament a priest anoints the sick with oil blessed specifically for that purpose. "The anointing of the sick can be administered to any member of the faithful who, having reached the use of reason, begins to be in danger by reason of illness or old age" (canon 1004; cf. CCC 1514). A new illness or a worsening of health enables a person to receive the sacrament a further time.

When, in the Western Church, the sacrament was conferred only on those in immediate danger of death, it came to be known as "extreme unction", i.e. "Final Anointing", administered as one of the last rites. The other last rites are confession (if the dying person is physically unable to confess, at least absolution, conditional on the existence of contrition, is given), and the Eucharist, which when administered to the dying is known as "bread for the journey" or by the Latin name "Viaticum", literally "provisions for a journey".

== Sacraments of service ==
=== Holy Orders ===
Holy orders is the sacrament by which a layman is made a deacon, a deacon is made a priest and a priest is made a bishop, dedicated for service to the Church. In descending order of rank, the three degrees are referred to as episcopate, presbyterate and diaconate. The bishop is the only minister of this sacrament. Ordination as a bishop confers the fullness of the sacrament, with membership of the College of Bishops, the successor body in the Church to that of the Apostles, and entrusting to the bishops the threefold office to teach, sanctify, and govern the People of God. Ordination as a priest confers on a priest to capacity to act in the person of Christ, the one essential High Priest and the Head of the Church, granting him the power and responsibility, as a "co-worker of the episcopal order", to celebrate the sacraments except for holy orders. Ordination as a deacon configures an ordinand in the service of the bishop, especially in the Church's exercise of Christian charity towards the poor, and preaching of the word of God.

Men who discern a vocation to the priesthood are required by canon law (canon 1032 of the 1983 Code of Canon Law) to undertake a seminary program with graduate level philosophical and theological studies and a formation program that includes spiritual direction, retreats, apostolate experience, and learning some Latin. The course of studies in preparation for ordination as a "permanent" deacon (one not intending to become a priest) is decided by the regional episcopal conference.

=== Matrimony ===
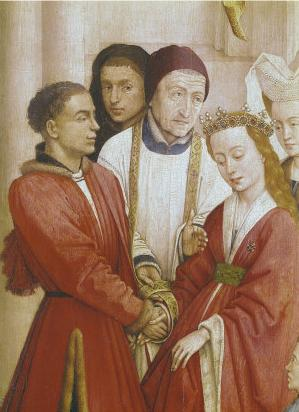
Matrimony, from Rogier Van der Weyden's altarpiece

Matrimony, or marriage, is also referred to as a "sacrament of service". Sacramental marriage consecrates a couple for a particular mission in building up the Church, and that provides grace for accomplishing that mission. This sacrament, seen as a sign of the love uniting Christ and the Church, establishes between the spouses a permanent and exclusive bond, sealed by God. Accordingly, a marriage between baptized people, validly entered into and consummated, cannot be dissolved. The sacrament confers on them the grace they need for attaining holiness in their married life and for responsible acceptance and upbringing of their children. As a condition for validity, the sacrament is celebrated in the presence of the local Ordinary or Parish Priest or of a cleric delegated by them (or in certain limited circumstances a lay person delegated by the diocesan Bishop with the approval of the Episcopal Conference and the permission of the Holy See) and at least two other witnesses, though in the theological tradition of the Latin Church the ministers of the sacrament uniquely are the couple themselves. For a valid marriage, a man and a woman must express their conscious and free consent to a definitive self-giving to the other, excluding none of the essential properties and aims of marriage. If one of the two is a non-Catholic Christian, their marriage is licit only if the permission of the competent authority of the Catholic Church is obtained. If one of the two is not a Christian (i.e. has not been baptized), the competent authority's dispensation is necessary for validity.

== Validity and liceity ==
As stated above, the effect of the sacraments comes ex opere operato (by the very fact of being administered). Since it is Christ who works through them, their effectiveness does not depend on the worthiness of the minister. The belief that the validity of the sacrament is dependent upon the holiness of the administrator was rejected in the Donatist crisis.

However, an apparent administration of a sacrament is invalid if the person acting as minister does not have the necessary power (as if a deacon were to celebrate Mass). They are also invalid if the required "matter" or "form" is lacking. The matter is the perceptible material object, such as water in baptism or bread and wine for the Eucharist, or the visible action. The form is the verbal statement that specifies the signification of the matter, such as, (in the Western Church), "N., I baptize you in the name of the Father, and of the Son, and of the Holy Spirit". Furthermore, if the minister positively excludes some essential aspect of the sacrament, the sacrament is invalid. This last condition lies behind the 1896 judgement of the Holy See denying the validity of Anglican Orders, a judgment that, though questioned, is still upheld.

A sacrament may be administered validly, but illicitly, if a condition imposed by canon law is not observed. Obvious cases are administration of a sacrament by a priest under a penalty of excommunication or suspension, or an episcopal ordination without the Pontifical mandate (except in certain circumstances outlined in Canon Law).

=== Impediments ===
Canon law specifies impediments to reception of the sacraments of orders and marriage. Some impediments are merely prohibitive and only concern liceity, but a diriment impediment renders invalid any attempt to confer the sacrament.

In the Latin Church, only the Holy See can authentically declare when divine law prohibits or invalidates a marriage, and only the Holy See has the right to establish for those who are baptised other impediments to marriage (canon 1075). But individual Eastern Catholic Churches, after having fulfilled certain requirements that include consulting (but not necessarily obtaining approval from) the Holy See, may establish impediments.

If an impediment is imposed by merely ecclesiastical law, rather than being a matter of divine law, the church may grant a dispensation from the impediment.

Conditions for validity of marriage such as sufficient use of reason (canon 1095) and freedom from coercion (canon 1103), and the requirement that, normally, a marriage be contracted in the presence of the local Ordinary or parish priest or of the priest or deacon delegated by either of them, and in the presence of two witnesses (canon 1108), are not classified in the 1983 Code of Canon Law as impediments, but have much the same effect.

=== Conditional conferral ===
Three of the sacraments may not be repeated: baptism, confirmation and holy orders: their effect is permanent. This teaching has been expressed by the images of, in the West, an indelible character or mark and of, in the East, a seal (CCC 698). However, if there is doubt about the validity of the administration of one or more of these sacraments, a conditional form of conferral may be used, such as: "If you are not already baptized, I baptize you …"

In the recent past, it was common practice in the Catholic Church to baptize conditionally almost every convert from Protestantism because of a perceived difficulty in judging about the validity in any concrete instance. In the case of the major Protestant denominations, agreements involving assurances about the manner in which they administer baptism has ended this practice, which sometimes continues for other groups of Protestant tradition. The Catholic Church has always recognized the validity of sacraments in the Eastern Orthodox Church, but it has explicitly denied the validity of the baptism conferred in the Church of Jesus Christ of Latter-day Saints. It does not recognize a baptismal ceremony in which the names of the three divine persons (or hypostases) of the Trinity—Father, Son and Holy Spirit—are replaced by descriptors such as Creator, Redeemer and Sanctifier, or Creator, Liberator, and Sustainer, and requires that the conditional form should not be used when baptizing those who have received this kind of baptism.

== Seven Sacraments fonts ==
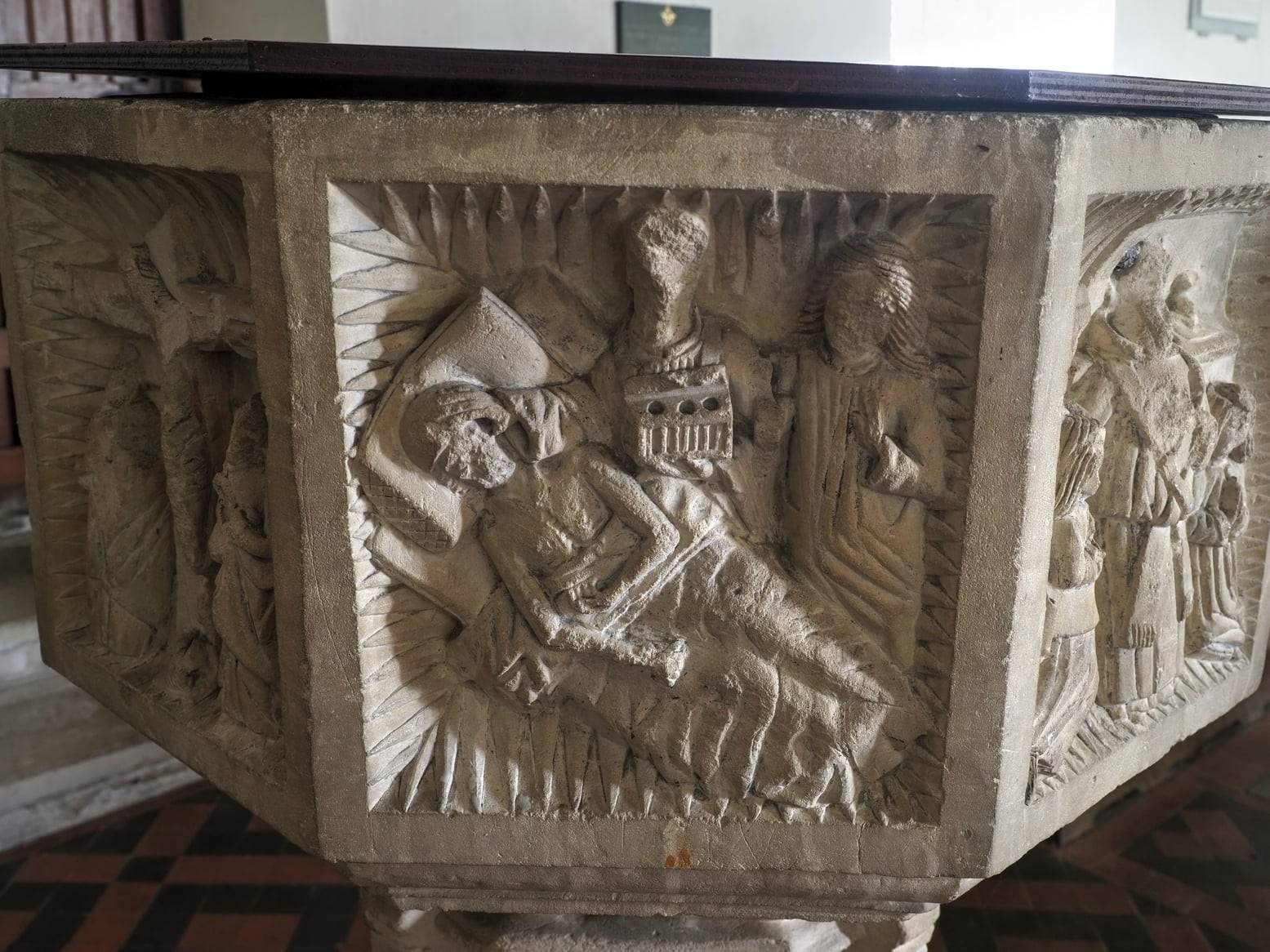
Extreme Unction on the font at Great Glemham, Suffolk.

Baptism being the first sacrament in an individual's life, the Seven Sacraments were adopted in the eastern counties of England as a decorative motif for fonts. An octagonal form allowed for relief sculptures of all seven. Examples can be found at St Bartholomew's, Sloley, Norfolk; All Saints, Great Glemham, Suffolk (photo by courtesy of Chris Droffats); St Andrew, Westhall, Suffolk; Weston St Peter, Suffolk; St Peter and St Paul, Salle, Norfolk; St Nicholas, East Dereham, Norfolk; The Church of the Assumption of the Blessed Virgin Mary, Great Witchingham, Norfolk; and Binham Priory, Norfolk.

== See also ==
- Maundy (foot washing) – Washing of the feet as a religious rite in Christianity
- Sacramental – Ritually blessed object or action
- Thomistic sacramental theology – Catholic theology by St. Thomas Aquinas

== Bibliography ==
- Berington, Joseph (1830). "The Sacraments." . The Faith of Catholics: confirmed by Scripture, and attested by the Fathers of the five first centuries of the Church, Volume 1. Jos. Booker.
- Raniero Cantalamessa OFMCap, Introduction, in: Easter in the Early Church. An Anthology of Jewish and Early Christian Texts, (1993), J.M. Quigley SJ, J.T. Lienhard SJ (translators & editors), Collegville, Minnesota: The Liturgical Press, pp. 254, ISBN 0-8146-2164-3
- Deharbe, Joseph (1912). "Chap. II. The Sacraments" . A Complete Catechism of the Catholic Religion. Translated by Rev. John Fander. Schwartz, Kirwin & Fauss.
- Kenan B. Osborne, OFM, (1987), The Christian Sacraments of Initiation. Baptism, Confirmation, Eucharist, New York-Mahwah: Paulist Press, ISBN 0-8091-2886-1
- Kennedy, Daniel Joseph (1912). "Sacraments" . In Herbermann, Charles (ed.). Catholic Encyclopedia. Vol. 13. New York: Robert Appleton Company.
- Poschmann Bernhard SJ (1963). Penance and the Anointing of the Sick. The Herder History of Dogma. Fr. Courtney SJ (transl. from German). Freiburg – London: Herder – Burns & Oates. p. 257.
- Liam G. Walsh OP (1988), The Sacraments of Christian Initiation. Baptism, Confirmation, Eucharist. London: Geoffrey Chapman, ISBN 0 225 66499 2, pp. 317.
- Vogel C. (1982). Le pécheur et la pénitence dans l'Église ancienne. Paris: Cerf. p. 213. ISBN 2-204-01949-6.
- Vogel C. (1982). Le pécheur et la pénitence au moyen-age. Paris: Cerf. p. 245. ISBN 2-204-01950-X.
- Edward Yarnold SJ, (1971) The awe inspiring rites of initiation. Baptismal homilies of the fourth century, Slough: St. Paul Publications, pp. 292 ISBN 0 85439 082 0
