= Chrismation =

Initiation rite also known as confirmation

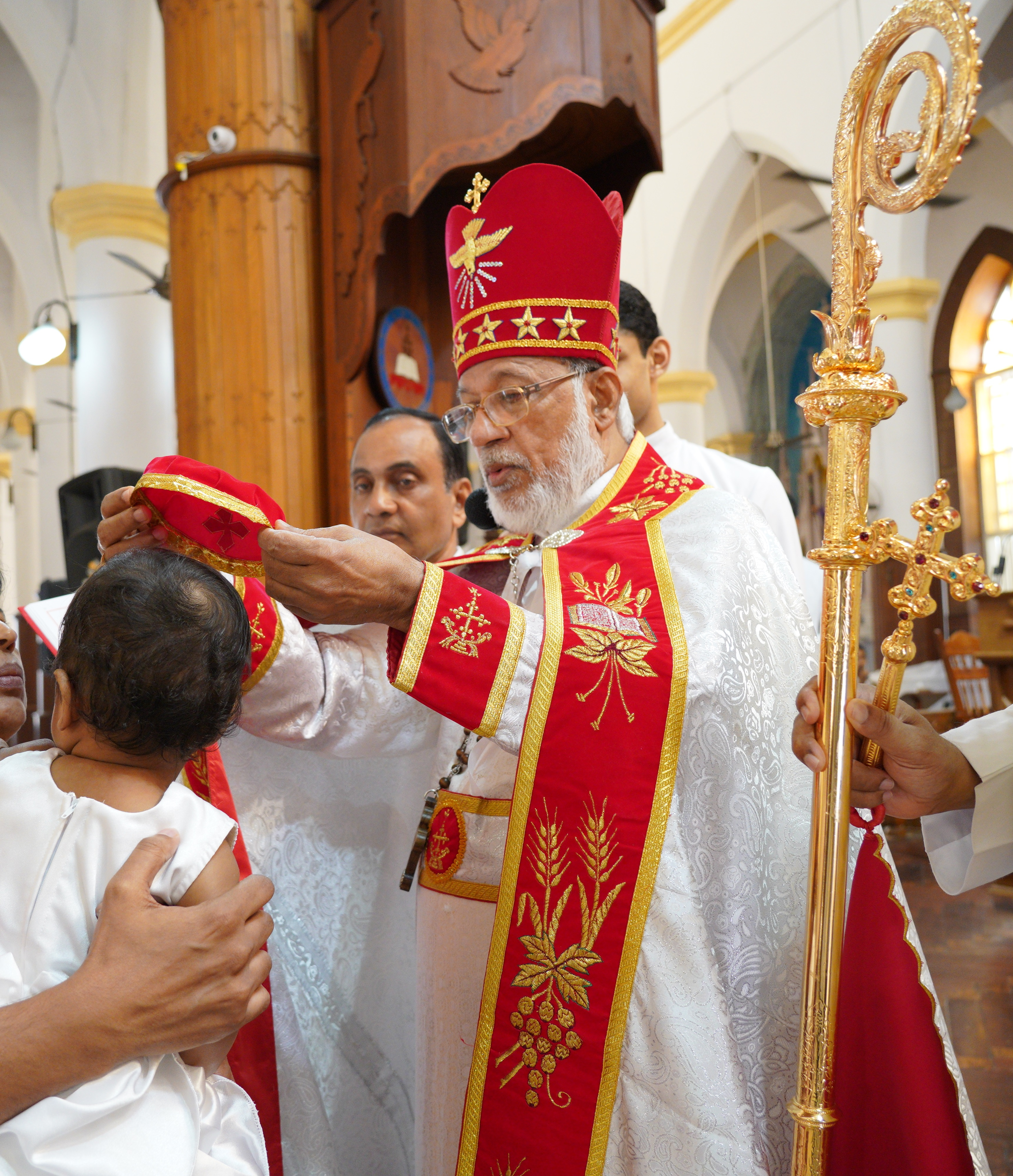
Syro-Malabar Catholic Major Archbishop crowning a baby during chrismation

Chrismation consists of the sacrament or mystery in the initiation rites of Eastern Christianity as practiced in the Eastern Orthodox Church, Oriental Orthodox Churches, Assyrian Church of the East and Eastern Catholic churches. The sacrament is more commonly known in Western Christianity as confirmation, although some languages such as Italian, Maltese and Portuguese normally use the terms cresima, griżma (tal-isqof) and crisma ("chrismation") rather than confermazione, konferma or confirmação, respectively ("confirmation").

The term chrismation comes about because it involves anointing the recipient of the sacrament with chrism (holy oil), which according to eastern Christian belief, the Apostles sanctified and introduced for all priests to use as a replacement for the laying on of hands by the Apostles.

Chrism consists of a "mixture of 40 sweet-smelling substances and pure olive oil" sanctified by a bishop with some older chrism added in, in the belief that some trace of the initial chrism sanctified by the Apostles remains therein.

== Liturgical form ==
=== Eastern Orthodox Church ===
==== Common part of the rite ====
The priest anoints the recipient with chrism, making the sign of the cross on the forehead, eyes, nostrils, mouth, ears, breast, hands, and feet using the following words each time: "The seal of the gift of the Holy Ghost" (in Greek: Σφραγὶς δωρεᾶς Πνεύματος Ἁγίου; in Church Slavonic: Печать дара Духа Святаго).

The chrism is washed off by a priest seven days later, according to the written rubrics, the newly baptized wearing their white chitons and not washing their anointed parts for that period. However, in the case of infant baptism (and often also with adult chrismation contemporary practice), the ablution is performed immediately after the rite of chrismation.

==== As part of the baptismal rite ====
Typically, one becomes a member of the Church by baptism and chrismation performed by a priest as a single service, or subsequent to baptism performed by a layman. While chrismation is often performed without baptism, baptism is never performed without chrismation; hence the term "baptism" is construed as referring to the administration of both sacraments (or mysteries), one after the other.

==== At the reconciliation of apostates ====
In the Eastern Orthodox Church the mystery may be conferred more than once as it is customary to receive apostates by repeating chrismation; according to the Book of Needs, the priest "taking the Holy Chrism, he anoints him (her) according to the order of those who are baptized ..." towards the end of the "Prayers of Purification for One Returning to the True Faith from Apostasy".

This practice is thus attested to in the ninth century by Saint Methodius of Constantinople in "The Rule of Methodius, Patriarch of Constantinople, Concerning the Return from Apostasy of Various Persons to the True Orthodox Faith":

If a child ... is in apostasy ... let him be washed. Upon leaving the bath, girded with a linen cloth, let him be anointed with Chrism, as one who is baptized. And let him put on a new robe in the manner of those who have been baptized.

If ... one who is of age has renounced his impending torment ... then let him be washed and anointed with Chrism according to the accepted Rite. And when the Liturgy is celebrated, let him be counted worthy of the Holy Things, occupying himself in Church and the Liturgy, as them that are baptized ...

==== At the reception of certain converts ====
Although normally administered in conjunction with baptism, in some cases chrismation alone may be used to receive converts to Orthodoxy through the exercise of economia. Although practice in this regard varies, in general, if a convert comes to Orthodoxy from another Christian confession and has previously undergone a rite of baptism in the Trinitarian Formula ("in the Name of the Father, and of the Son, and of the Holy Ghost"), he or she may be received into the Orthodox Church through the sacrament of chrismation, after which he or she would receive the Holy Eucharist. On the other hand, if a convert comes from a group which practices an invalid, non-Trinitarian baptism (such as Mormons, Jehovah's Witnesses, or Oneness Pentecostals) or from one that does not practice baptism at all (such as Quakers or The Salvation Army), baptism is a prerequisite for chrismation—an initiate must always be validly baptized in the name of the Father, Son, and Holy Ghost before any further sacraments can be administered. The use of economia is at the discretion of, and subject to the guidelines imposed by, the local bishop. Converts from non-Christian religions also need to be baptized before chrismation.

The sacrament of chrismation is an extension of the day of Pentecost, when the Holy Ghost was poured out on the Apostles. It is by chrismation that a person becomes a layperson — a member of the laos (laity), the people of God. Metropolitan Kallistos (Timothy Ware) explains:

Through Chrismation every member of the Church becomes a prophet, and receives a share in the royal priesthood of Christ; all Christians alike, because they are chrismated, are called to act as conscious witnesses to the Truth. "You have an anointing (chrisma) from the Holy One, and know all things" (1John 2:20).

=== Oriental Orthodox churches ===
Chrismation in Oriental Orthodoxy is similar to that of Eastern Orthodoxy but is performed according to their sacramental theology, and may vary according to the particular church.

== Sacramental theology ==
=== Eastern Churches ===
Whereas in Western Christian theology, confirmation is seen as completing or sealing of the baptismal covenant, the conferral of full membership, the perfecting one's bond with the Church, and/or the strengthening of gifts of the Holy Ghost to enable the recipient to live the Christian life, in the Eastern Orthodox tradition chrismation is understood more fundamentally as the bestowal of the Holy Ghost—that is, as the transmission to that person of the experience of the Day of Pentecost (cf. Acts of the Apostles 2:1-4ff), along with the attendant gifts of the Spirit that are given to all the faithful, and any unique or special gifts that God deems appropriate for that person, to enable him or her to realize his or her intended potentiality as a child of God and as a unique member of Christ's Body, the Church. Hence the significance of the sacrament or mystery of chrismation is understood quite distinctly from that of baptism, much as Pentecost is distinct from the Passion and Resurrection.

Whereas in the western churches (e.g. Roman Catholic and Anglican) confirmation is typically reserved to those of "the age of reason", chrismation in the Eastern churches (including Eastern Rite Catholic Churches) is ordinarily administered immediately after baptism, most commonly infant baptism. After receiving this sacrament, the recipient is eligible to receive the Eucharist; one who has not been chrismated is viewed as not qualified to receive the Eucharist, since they have not yet received the Holy Ghost. Baptism is followed immediately (or at least soon afterwards) by the person's first reception of Holy Communion.

The sacramental rite of chrismation may be performed by a presbyter (priest). In the Eastern tradition, chrismation shows the unity of the church through the bishop in the continuation of the Apostolic faith, because the chrism used is prepared and consecrated by a bishop (normally the leading bishop of an autocephalous Church, or – for some autocephalous churches – by the Patriarch of Constantinople) and is presented to the priest by the bishop and (together with the antimension) and is the symbol of the priest's permission from the bishop to perform the sacraments (see faculty). Although priests in the Eastern churches are universally granted this faculty, it is thus ultimately considered a sacrament granted by a bishop and associated with that Apostolic office. Furthermore, because some of the previously sanctified chrism is mixed with the newly sanctified chrism, there is a belief that the chrism contains a remnant of, or at least a connection to, the same chrism which was sanctified by the Apostles in the first century, and thus is a symbol of apostolic succession.

=== Oriental Orthodox ===
The Coptic Orthodox Church follows a tradition that states while the Apostles used to give Confirmation by the laying on of the hands, they found they were not able to travel to lay hands as the number of converts grew. Thus they ordered the collection of the spices which were used to anoint Christ's body, and they were mixed with oil, forming, according to Coptic tradition, the first chrism, or "myron", which, according to tradition, was brought to Egypt by St Mark. The Coptic communion believes that, since that time, the "myron" has been remade 41 times.

=== Assyrian Church of the East ===
Some similar views to the Orthodox Churches regarding sacramental theology of chrismation are held by the Assyrian Church of the East, which recognizes only two ecumenical councils, the First Council of Nicaea and the First Council of Constantinople.

== See also ==
- Washing and anointing
- Confirmation in the Catholic Church
