= Trinitarian formula =

In Christianity, phrase referring to the Trinity

Pronunciation of the trinitarian formula in Latin: "In nomine Patris et Filii et Spiritus Sancti, amen"

The "Shield of the Trinity" or "Scutum Fidei" diagram of traditional Western Christian symbolism

The Trinitarian formula is the phrase "in the name of the Father, and of the Son, and of the Holy Spirit" (Koine Greek: εἰς τὸ ὄνομα τοῦ Πατρὸς καὶ τοῦ Υἱοῦ καὶ τοῦ Ἁγίου Πνεύματος, romanized: eis to ónoma toû Patros kai toû Huioû kai toû Hagíou Pneúmatos; Latin: in nomine Patris et Filii et Spiritus Sancti), or words to that effect, referring to the three persons of the Christian Trinity. It is often followed by an "amen".

The Trinitarian formula is used in baptism as well as in numerous prayers, rites, liturgies, and sacraments. One of its most common uses apart from baptism is when Roman Catholics, Eastern and Oriental Orthodox, Lutherans, Anglicans, Methodists, and others make the sign of the cross while reciting the formula.

== Biblical origin ==
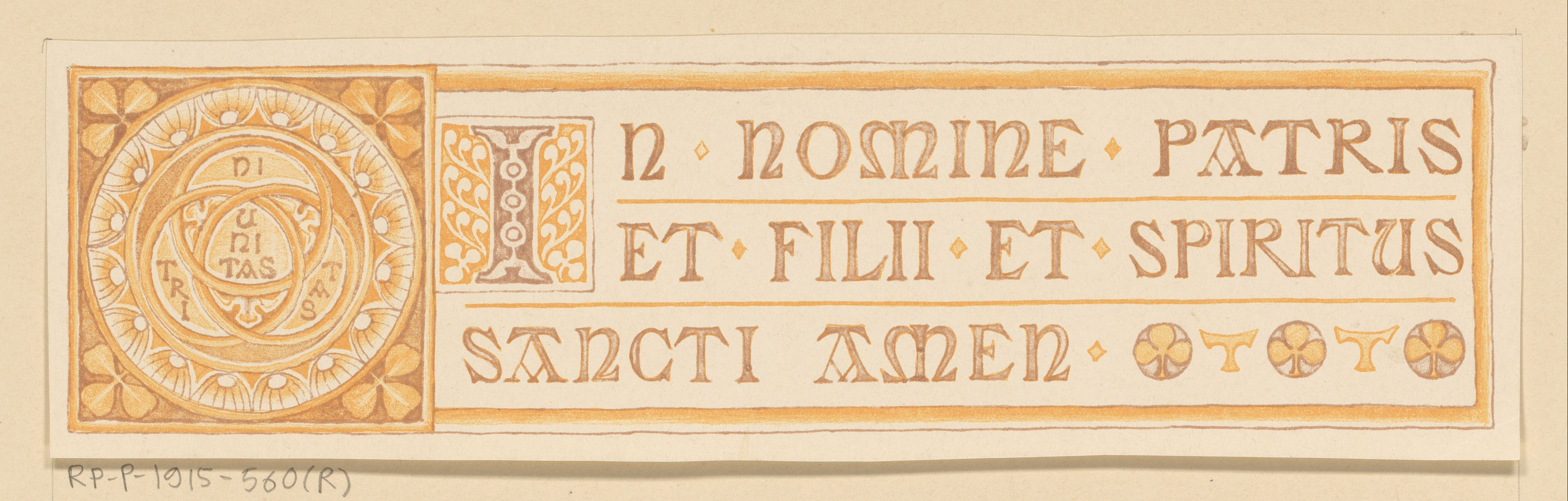
Calligraphy by Antoon Derkinderen, 1895

These words are quoted from a command of the risen Jesus in the Great Commission: "Go, therefore, and make disciples of all nations, baptizing them in the name of the Father, and of the Son, and of the Holy Spirit" (Matthew 28:19).

The formula is mentioned in the Didache (7:1-3), and it is mostly accepted as authentic due to its supporting manuscript evidence. Nevertheless, some scholars have held the view that the passage is an interpolation as it is absent from the first few centuries of early Christian quotations, in which case it would be part of an apostolic or early Christian oral tradition from which both the received texts of Matthew and the Didache emerged. The view of the passage as an interpolation was in recent times maintained by the Jesus Seminar, a nontrinitarian movement active in the 1990s. Critics of the Jesus Seminar described this particular line of argument as eisegesis based on a preconceived conclusion.

== Use in baptism ==
According to the doctrines of Roman Catholicism, Oriental Orthodoxy, Eastern Orthodoxy, and most forms of Protestantism, such as Lutheranism, Calvinism and Anglicanism, a baptism is not valid unless the Trinitarian formula is used in the administration of that sacrament. Consequently, they may not recognize religious communities that baptize without this formula – e.g., Unitarians, Jehovah's Witnesses, and Oneness Pentecostals, all of whom deny the Trinity – as Christian denominations. This is also the case with baptisms within The Church of Jesus Christ of Latter-day Saints (LDS church). Although LDS members baptize with the same Trinitarian formula, they reject the Nicene Trinitarian conception and regard the three persons of the Trinity as being distinct personages united not in substance, but in dominion and purpose.

Baptism according to the Trinitiarian formula is seen as being a basis for Christian ecumenism, the concept of working towards the eventual unity of Christians belonging to different Christian denominations.

== See also ==
- Validity and liceity (Catholic Church)
