= 13th century in philosophy =

This is a timeline of philosophy in the 13th century.

== Events ==
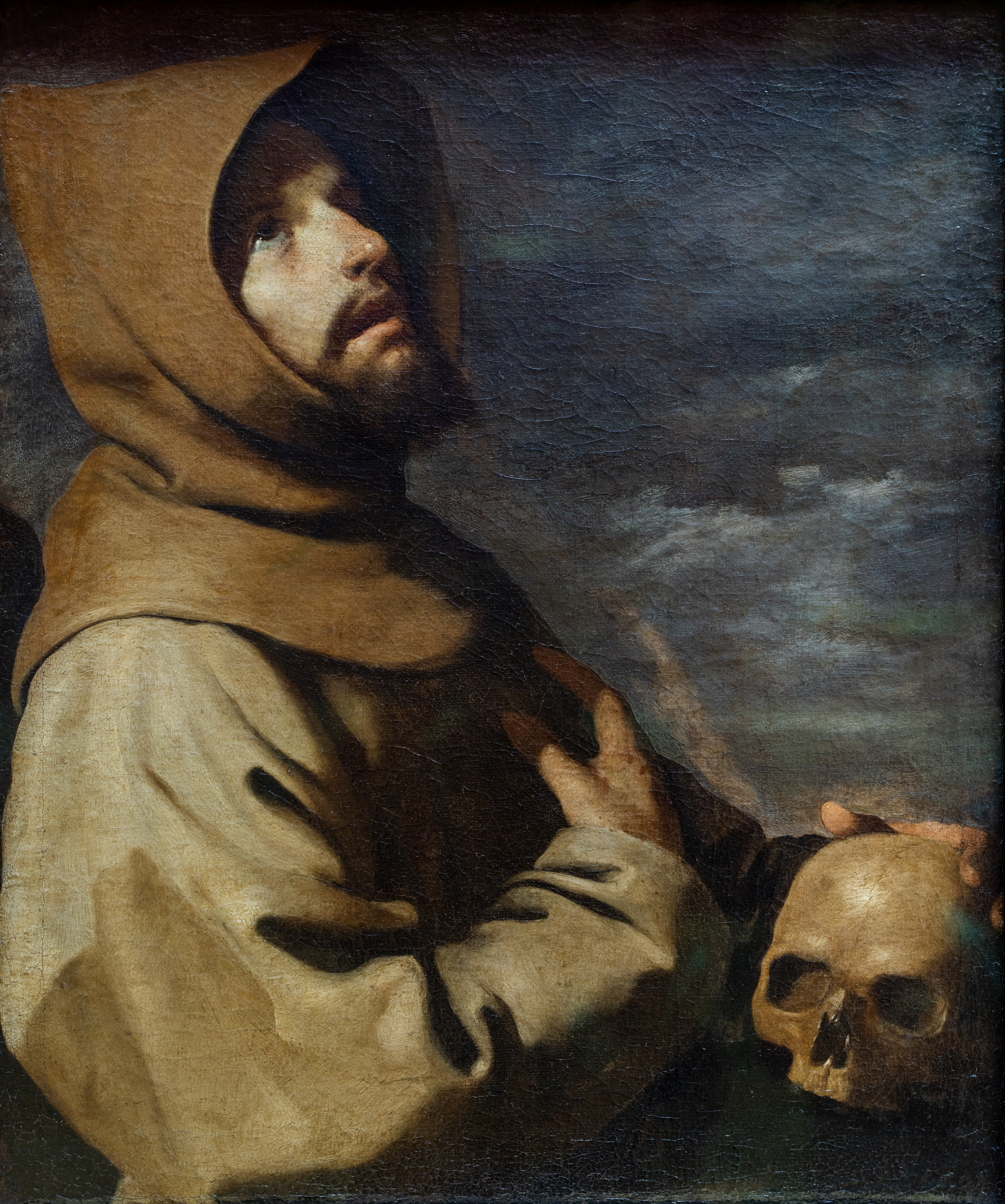
A painting of Francis of Assisi by Francisco de Zurbarán

- 1204 – The Franciscan Order is formed by Francis of Assisi which would later have a major impact on Christian philosophy.
- 1210 – The bishops of Paris ban the teaching of Aristotle's natural philosophy at the University of Paris.
- 1222 – The University of Padua is established, which became an important center of philosophy in Europe in the following centuries.
- 1228 – Dōgen introduces Sōtō Zen to Japan.
- 1242 – A mathematical device named the Tusi couple is developed by al-Tusi which challenges Ptolemaic ideas.
- 1248 – The Dominican Order establishes a studium generale in Germany, promoting the study of theology and scholastic thought in Europe.
- 1258 – The public academy and intellectual center, the House of Wisdom is destroyed during the siege of Baghdad.
- 1250 – The oldest recorded usage of a movable type printed a Buddhist text called Sangjeong Gogeum Yemun in Korea which was carried out by Ch'oe Yun-ŭi.
- 1270 – Led by Bishop Étienne Tempier, the Church condemns 13 propositions derived from Aristotelian and Averroist philosophies from being taught at the University of Paris.
- 1263 – The Disputation of Barcelona takes place where Nahmanides, leading Jewish scholar debates Pablo Christiani, a Jewish converso and Dominican friar over whether Jesus was the Jewish messiah.
- 1277 – Reaffirming earlier condemnations by the University of Paris, they denounce 219 propositions from many sources, including the works of Thomas Aquinas.

== Publications ==
- Metaphysique et Noetique by Albertus Magnus
- Liber de causis proprietatum elementorum by Albertus Magnus
- Kethabha dhe-Bhabhatha by Bar Hebraeus
- Quaternuli by David of Dinant
- De regimine principum by Giles of Rome
- Summa quaestionum ordinarium by Henry of Ghent
- Quodlibeta Theologica by Henry of Ghent
- Tagmulei haNefesh by Hillel ben Samuel
- Fuṣūṣ Al-Ḥikam by Ibn Arabi
- Al-Tanqīḥāt fī Sharḥ al-Talwīḥāt by Ibn Kammuna
- al-Masāʼil al-Ṣiqilliyya by Ibn Sab'in
- Tractatus de divisione potentiarum animae by John of la Rochelle
- Logica by Lambert of Auxerre
- Zohar by Moses de León
- Akhlāq-i Nāsirī by Nasir al-Din al-Tusi
- Rissho Ankoku Ron by Nichiren
- Summulae Logicales by Peter of Spain
- Summa de bono by Philip the Chancellor
- Conciliator differentiarum quae inter philosophos et medicos versantur by Pietro d'Abano
- Ashtadasa Rahasyangal by Pillai Lokacharya
- Ars Magna by Ramon Llull
- Ars compendiosa inveniendi veritatem by Ramon Llull
- Ars demonstrativa by Ramon Llull
- Ars inventiva veritatis by Ramon Llull
- Art amativa by Ramon Llull
- Lectura super figuras Artis demonstrativae by Ramon Llull
- De luce by Robert Grosseteste
- De tempore by Robert Kilwardby
- De spiritu fantastico sive de receptione specierum by Robert Kilwardby
- Quaestiones supra libros Ethicorum by Robert Kilwardby
- Quaestiones in librum primum Sententiarum by Robert Kilwardby
- Quaestiones in librum secundum Sententiarum by Robert Kilwardby
- Quaestiones in librum tertium Sententiarum by Robert Kilwardby
- Quaestiones in librum quartum Sententiarum by Robert Kilwardby
- De ortu scientiarum by Robert Kilwardby
- Opus Majus by Roger Bacon
- Opus Minus by Roger Bacon
- Opus Tertium by Roger Bacon
- Summa Grammatica by Roger Bacon
- Summa de sophismatibus et distinctionibus by Roger Bacon
- Summulae dialectics by Roger Bacon
- De multiplictione specierum by Roger Bacon
- Communia naturalium by Roger Bacon
- Epistola de secretis operibus naturae et de nullitate magiae by Roger Bacon
- Compendium studii philosophiae by Roger Bacon
- Epistola de secretis operibus naturae et de nullitate magiae by Roger Bacon
- Iggeret ha-Wikkuaḥ by Shem-Tov ibn Falaquera
- Tractatus de anima intellectiva by Siger of Brabant
- Quaestiones logicales by Siger of Brabant
- Quaestiones naturales by Siger of Brabant
- De aeternitate mundi by Siger of Brabant
- Quaestio utrum haec sit vera: Homo est animal nullo homine existente by Siger of Brabant
- Impossibilia by Siger of Brabant
- Summa Theologicae by Thomas Aquinas
- Summa contra Gentiles by Thomas Aquinas
- Quaestiones Disputatae de Veritate by Thomas Aquinas
- Scriptum super libros sententiarum Petri Lombardi by Thomas Aquinas
- De ente et essentia by Thomas Aquinas
- Quaestiones disputatae de potentia Dei by Thomas Aquinas
- In libros posteriorum Analyticorum expositio by Thomas Aquinas
- In libros De anima expositio by Thomas Aquinas
- In librum De sensu et sensato expositio by Thomas Aquinas
- In librum De memoria et reminiscentia expositio by Thomas Aquinas
- Super librum De causis expositio by Thomas Aquinas
- De unitate intellectus, contra Averroistas by Thomas Aquinas
- In libros Meteorologicorum expositio by Thomas Aquinas
- Quaestiones disputatae de virtutibus by Thomas Aquinas
- Quaestiones disputatae de malo by Thomas Aquinas
- Sapientiale by Thomas of York
- De summo bono by Ulrich of Strasbourg
- Shatadushani by Vendanta Desika
- Mimamsa Paduka by Vendanta Desika
- Tattva Mukta Kalapa by Vendanta Desika
- Perspectiva by Vitello
- Summa aurea by William of Auxerre

== Births ==
- 1200 – Albertus Magnus, German Dominican friar, philosopher, scientist, and bishop.
- 1200 – Dōgen, Japanese Zen Buddhist monk, writer, poet, and philosopher.
- 1200 – William of Saint-Amour, French scholastic philosopher and theologian.
- 1200 – John of La Rochelle, French Franciscan friar, scholastic philosopher, and theologian.
- 1201 – Nasir al-Din al-Tusi, Persian polymath.
- 1201 – Richard de Fournival, French philosopher and trouvère.
- 1205 – Pillai Lokacharya, Indian philosopher.
- 1215 – Ibn Kammuna, Iraqi Jewish physician and philosopher.
- 1215 – Pope John XXI, bishop of Rome and head of Catholic Church, (usually identified as the logician, herbalist, and philosopher, Peter of Spain).
- 1215 – Robert Kilwardby, English Archbishop of Canterbury, cardinal, and scholar.
- 1215 – William of Moerbeke, Flemish Dominican cleric and translator.
- 1217 – Henry of Ghent, Belgian scholastic philosopher.
- 1219/20 – Roger Bacon, English polymath and Franciscan friar.
- 1220 – Thomas of York, Franciscan theologian and scholastic philosopher.
- 1220 – Hillel ben Samuel, Italian Jewish physician, philosopher, and Talmudist.
- 1221 – Bonaventure, Italian Franciscan bishop, cardinal, theologian, and philosopher.
- 1222 – Nichiren, Japanese Buddhist priest and philosopher.
- 1225 – Thomas Aquinas, Italian Dominican friar, priest, philosopher, and theologian.
- 1225 – Shem-Tov ibn Falaquera, Sephardic Jewish philosopher, poet, and commentator.
- 1225 – Ulrich of Strasbourg, German Dominican theologian and scholastic philosopher.
- 1226 – Bar Hebraeus, Syrian polymath.
- 1230 – Vitello, Polish friar, theologian, and natural philosopher.
- 1232 – Ramon Llull, Spanish philosopher, theologian, poet, missionary, and Christian apologist.
- 1240 – Siger of Brabant, Belgian philosopher.
- 1240 – Matthew of Aquasparta, Italian Franciscan friar and philosopher.
- 1240 – Abraham Abulafia, Sephardic Jewish philosopher and writer.
- 1243 – Giles of Rome, Italian philosopher and theologian.
- 1243 – Narahari Tirtha, Indian philosopher, scholar, and statesman.
- 1246 – Henry Bate of Mechelen, Brabantian philosopher, theologian, astronomer, astrologer, poet, and musician.
- 1248 – Peter John Olivi, French Franciscan theologian and philosopher.
- 1249 – Richard of Middleton, French or English Franciscan theologian and scholastic philosopher.
- 1250 – Theodoric of Freiberg, German Dominican priest, philosopher, theologian, and physicist.
- 1257 – Pietro d'Abano, Italian philosopher, astrologer, and professor.
- 1260 – Simon of Faversham, English scholastic philosopher and university chancellor.
- 1260 – Meister Eckhart, German Catholic priest, theologian, philosopher, and mystic.
- 1260 – Vital du Four, French Franciscan theologian and scholastic philosopher.
- 1265 – Dante, Italian poet, writer, and philosopher.
- 1265/66 – Duns Scotus, Scottish Catholic priest and Franciscan friar, professor, philosopher, and theologian.
- 1268 – Vedanta Desika, Indian polymath.
- 1269 – Vidyadhiraja Tirthu, Indian Hindu philosopher, dialectician, and the seventh pontiff of Madhvacharya Peetha.
- 1270 – Abner of Burgos, Sephardic Jewish philosopher and polemical writer.
- 1270 – Alexander Bonini, Italian Franciscan friar and philosopher.
- 1270 – Theodore Metochites, Byzantine Greek statesman, author, philosopher, and patron.
- 1270 – Radulphus Brito, French grammarian and philosopher.
- 1275 – Sant Dnyaneshwar, Indian saint, poet, philosopher, and yogi.
- 1275 – Durandus of Saint-Pourçain, French Dominican, philosopher, theologian, and bishop.
- 1275 – Walter Burley, English scholastic philosopher and logician.
- 1280 – Francis of Meyronnes, French scholastic philosopher.
- 1280 – Petrus Aureoli, Italian scholastic philosopher and theologian.
- 1282 – Akshobhya Tirtha, Indian philosopher, scholar, and theologian.
- 1285 – John of Jandun, French philosopher, theologian, and political writer.
- 1287 – William of Ockham, English Franciscan friar, scholastic philosopher, apologist, and theologian.
- 1290 – Walter Chatton, English scholastic philosopher and theologian.
- 1290 – Francis of Marchia, Italian Franciscan theologian and philosopher.
- 1290 – Robert Holcot, English Dominican scholastic philosopher and theologian.
- 1290 – Narayana Panditacharya, Indian scholar and philosopher.
- 1293 – Judah ben Moses Romano, Italian Jewish philosopher and translator.

== Deaths ==
- 1200 – Zhu Xi, Chinese calligrapher, historian, philosopher, poet, and politician.
- 1202 – Joachim of Fiore, Italian Christian theologian, Catholic abbot, and the founder of the monastic order of San Giovanni in Fiore.
- 1202/03 – Alain de Lille, French theologian, philosopher, professor, and poet.
- 1204 – Maimonides, Sephardic Jewish rabbi, philosopher, astronomer, and physician.
- 1209 – Fakhr al-Din al-Razi, Persian polymath.
- 1210 – Jinul, Korean monk.
- 1212 – Hōnen, Japanese religious reformer and progenitor of Jōdo Buddhism.
- 1215 – Ralph of Longchamp, English scholastic philosopher, natural philosopher, and physician.
- 1217 – David of Dinat, Belgian pantheistic philosopher.
- 1217 – Ibn Sab'in, Andalusi Arab philosopher.
- 1225 – Urso of Calabria, Italian philosopher and author.
- 1231 – William of Auxerre, French scholastic philosopher and theologian.
- 1230 – Samuel ibn Tibbon, French Jewish philosopher and physician.
- 1235 – Zhen Dexiu, Chinese politician and philosopher.
- 1240 – Ibn Arabi, Andalusi Arab scholar, mystic, poet, and philosopher.
- 1242 – George Pachymeres, Byzantine Greek historian, philosopher, music theorist and miscellaneous writer.
- 1243 – Haymo of Faversham, English Franciscan scholar and professor.
- 1245 – Alexander of Hales, Franciscan friar, theologian, and scholastic philosopher.
- 1245 – John of La Rochelle, French Franciscan friar, scholastic philosopher, and theologian.
- 1248 – Ibn Kammuna, Iraqi Jewish physician and philosopher.
- 1248 – John Blund, English scholastic philosopher.
- 1249 – William of Auvergne, French theologian and philosopher.
- 1253 – Robert Grosseteste, English statesman, scholastic philosopher, theologian, scientist, and bishop.
- 1253 – Dōgen, Japanese Zen Buddhist monk, writer, poet, and philosopher.
- 1259 – Roland of Cremona, Italian Dominican theologian and scholastic philosopher.
- 1260 – Richard de Fournival, French philosopher and trouvère.
- 1260 – Aaron ben Joseph of Constantinople, teacher, philosopher, physician, and liturgical poet.
- 1262 – Altheides, Cypriot philosopher.
- 1263 – Shinran, Japanese Buddhist monk.
- 1270 – Nachmanides, Catalonian Jewish scholar, rabbi, philosopher, physician, kabbalist, and biblical commentator.
- 1274 – Thomas Aquinas, Italian Dominican friar, priest, philosopher, theologian, and a jurist in scholasticism.
- 1274 – Nasir al-Din al-Tusi, Persian polymath.
- 1275 – Shemariah of Negropont, Greek-Jewish philosopher and Biblical exegete.
- 1277 – Ulrich of Strasbourg, German Dominican theologian and scholastic philosopher.
- 1279 – Robert Kilwardby, English Archbishop of Canterbury, cardinal, and scholar.
- 1260 – Richard Rufus, Cornish Franciscan scholastic philosopher, and theologian.
- 1280 – Albertus Magnus, German Dominican friar, philosopher, scientist, and bishop.
- 1280 – Vitello, Polish friar, theologian, and natural philosopher.
- 1282 – Nichiren, Japanese Buddhist priest and philosopher.
- 1286 – Bar Hebraeus, Syrian polymath.
- 1286 – William of Moerbeke, Flemish Dominican cleric, philosopher, and translator.
- 1292 – Roger Bacon, English polymath and Franciscan friar.
- 1293 – Henry of Ghent, Belgian scholastic philosopher.
- 1294 – Bartholomew of Bologna, Italian Franciscan scholastic philosopher.
- 1295 – Hillel ben Samuel, Italian Jewish physician, philosopher, and Talmudist.
- 1296 – Sant Dnyaneshwar, Indian saint, poet, philosopher, and yogi.
- 1298 – Peter John Olivi, French Franciscan theologian and philosopher.

== See also ==
- List of centuries in philosophy
- Medieval philosophy
- Islamic Golden Age
