= Summa =

Medieval genre of handbook, summing up a field of knowledge

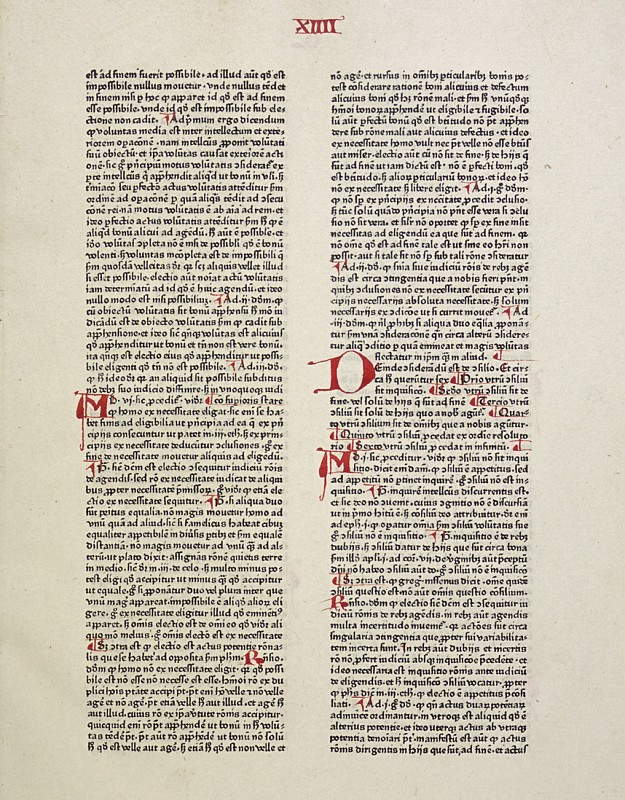
Page from Summa theologica, pars secunda, primus liber, printed in Mainz by Peter Schöffer, 1471.

Summa and its diminutive summula (plural summae and summulae, respectively) was a medieval didactics literary genre written in Latin, born during the 12th century, and popularized in 13th-century Europe. In its simplest sense, they might be considered texts that 'sum up' knowledge in a field, such as the compendiums of theology, philosophy and canon law. Their function during the Middle Ages was largely as manuals or handbooks of necessary knowledge used by individuals who would not advance their studies any further.

== Features ==
It was a kind of encyclopedia that developed a matter about Law, Theology or Philosophy most of all. Matters were divided in a more detailed way as it was in the tractatus (treatise), since they were divided into quaestiones (questions) and these ones were also divided into articles. The articles had the following structure:

1. Title of the article as a question and showing two different positions (disputatio).
2. Objections or arguments against one of the alternatives, specially the one that defended the author.
3. Arguments in favor of such an alternative, based on the Bible, the Holy Fathers and so on.
4. Solution, that includes arguments that combine faith and reason and that express the author's thought.
5. The sententia or answer to the question, that consists in the refutation of the initial objections against the author's solution.

== History ==
Some historians of theology cite Origen's peri archon as the first summary of Catholic theology. Others consider that the first in point of time is "De Trinitate" by St. Hilary of Poitiers. The distinction has also been accorded to Radulfus Ardens, an eleventh-century theologian and preacher, a native of Beaulieu, author of a comprehensive "Speculum Universale", still in Manuscript. In this wide sense of the word, however, the encyclopedic treatises of St. Isidore of Seville, Rabanus Maurus etc., entitled "De Etymologiis" or "De Universo" might also be considered to be summaries of theology and philosophy.

In the stricter sense of the word, "Summa" is applied to the more technical systematic compendiums which began to appear in the twelfth century. According to the Stanford Encyclopedia of Philosophy, the form was invented by the grammarian Peter Helias. An alternative title is "Sentences" (Latin Libri Sententiarum), the diminutive, "Summulæ", being of later origin. What is peculiar to "summists" or "sententiaries", as the authors of these works are called, is the adoption of the method first suggested by Gerbert in his "De Rationali et Ratione Uti", and used by Abelard in his "Sic et Non", consisting in an exposition of contradictory views, the affirmative and negative. Progress towards the final form of the thirteenth-century "Summæ" is marked by the greater care which was taken, as time went on, to explain in a systematic manner the apparent contradiction among the conflicting opinions presented. Besides this method of exposition, the twelfth-century summists adopted dialectic definitely as a means of elucidating, not only philosophical, but also theological truth. Finally the summists adopted more or less unanimously a fixed division of the field of theology and philosophy, and adhered more or less closely to a definite order of topics, although varying in their arrangement.

The first great summist was Peter Lombard (died 1160), author of the Books of Sentences and surnamed "Master of Sentences". The order of topics in the Books of Sentences is as follows: In the first place, the topics are divided into res and signa, or things and signs. "Things" are subdivided into: the object of our happiness, God — to this topic Peter devotes the first book; means of attaining this object, viz., creatures — the topic treated in the second book; virtues, men and angels, that is, special means of happiness and subjects of happiness — the topic of the third book; the fourth book is devoted to signs: the sacraments.

How far Peter Lombard was influenced by earlier summists, such as Robert Pullen, Hugh of St. Victor and the author of the "Summa Sententiarum" which was immediately inspired by Abelard's work, historians have not determined. It is generally admitted that the Lombard was not entirely original. He deserves his renown as the first great summist chiefly because, in spite of the opposition which his work met during his lifetime, its influence grew greater in time, until in the thirteenth century it was universally adopted as a text. Notwithstanding all that hostile critics of Scholasticism have said about the dryness and unattractiveness of the medieval "Summæ", these works have many merits from the point of view of pedagogy, and a philosophical school which supplements, as Scholasticism did, the compendious treatment of the "Summæ", with the looser form of treatment of the "Quæstiones Disputatæ" and the "Opuscula", unites in its method of writing the advantages which modern philosophy derives from the combination of textbook and doctor's dissertation. The Summa Theologica of St. Thomas Aquinas, begun when Aquinas was Regent Master at the studium provinciale at Santa Sabina the forerunner of the Pontifical University of Saint Thomas Aquinas, Angelicum, is often considered the most perfect specimen of this kind of literature.

The term "Summulæ" was used, for the most part, to designate the logical compendiums which came to be adopted as texts in the schools during the thirteenth century. The best known of these is the "Summulæ Logicales" of Peter Hispanus, afterwards Pope John XXI.

== Dominican works ==
Manuals of theology and more especially manuals, or summae, on penance for the use of confessors were composed in great numbers. The oldest Dominican commentaries on the "Sentences" are those of Roland of Cremona, Hugh of Saint Cher, Richard Fitzacre, Robert of Kilwardby and Albertus Magnus. The series begins with the year 1230 if not earlier and the last are prior to the middle of the thirteenth century.

The "Summa" of St. Thomas (1265–75) is still the masterpiece of theology. The monumental work of Albertus Magnus is unfinished. The "Summa de bono" of Ulrich of Strasburg (d. 1277), a disciple of Albert is still unedited, but is of interest to the historian of the thought of the thirteenth century. The theological summa of St. Antoninus is highly esteemed by moralists and economists. The "Compendium theologicæ veritatis" of Hugh Ripelin of Strasburg (d. 1268) is the most widespread and famous manual of the Middle Ages.

The chief manual of confessors is that of Paul of Hungary composed for the Brothers of St. Nicholas of Bologna (1220–21) and edited without mention of the author in the "Bibliotheca Casinensis" and with false assignment of authorship by Raymund Duellius. The "Summa de Poenitentia" of Raymond of Pennafort, composed in 1235, was a classic during the Middle Ages and was one of the works of which the manuscripts were most multiplied. The "Summa Confessorum" of John of Freiburg (d. 1314) is, according to Johann Friedrich von Schulte, the most perfect product of this class of literature.

The Pisan Bartolommeo of San Concordio has left us a "Summa Casuum" composed in 1338, in which the matter is arranged in alphabetical order. It was very successful in the thirteenth and fourteenth centuries. The manuals for confessors of John Nieder (d. 1438), St. Antoninus, Archbishop of Florence (d. 1459), and Girolamo Savonarola (d. 1498) were much esteemed in their time

Beginning with Cardinal Cajetan in the early 16th century, theologians, especially those of the Dominican Order, gradually began to shift from commenting on the Master's Sentences towards commenting on St. Thomas Aquinas's Summa Theologiae.

== Law ==
In the area of Law, the summa is a practical and didactic genre, that was developed from the methodology of the gloss. It was divided into two different literary genres: the summa (derived from the similia), and the questio legitima (derived from the contraria).

The summa was born in the minor Law schools whose aim was to instruct their students with easy summaries of the Justinian codes. In order to achieve this goal, easy, simple and systematic summaries of whole works were made, and the literary genre of the summae in the legal area was born.

The summae were developed specially in the civil law schools of Occitanie specially regarding Justinian's Institutiones.

=== Some important legal summae ===
- Azo of Bologna's Summa Codicis.
- Summa Codicis written in Occitan and known as Lo Codi, translated into Latin by Riccardo Pisano.

== Theology and Philosophy ==
The teaching of Theology and Philosophy during the Middle Ages had two different ways: lectio and disputatio:

- The lectio (lesson) was very similar to a present class. The teacher commented the sentences and doctrines of famous and known authors, such as for instance, Aristotle's or Boethius' works, or Peter Lombard's sentences.
- The disputatio (dispute) was more informal than the lectio, and was a real dialogue between teachers and disciples, where arguments in favour of or against any theses or subject were defended.

These two school methods originated their literary forms:

- From the lectio, the commentaria (commentaries) were born. And these ones brought the summae about, which were freer and more autonomous and systematic than the commentaria.
- The disputatio originated the quaestiones disputatae (disputed matters), that gather the material of the disputes that were held every two weeks; and the quodlibeta (random questions), that gathered the disputes that were held in Christmas and Easter. This methodology of the disputationes was the technical model of the famous mediaeval summae.

=== Theology ===
There are more or less sixty extant summae in this field, including:

- Simon of Tournai's Summa or Institutiones in sacram paginam, 1165
- Prepositinus of Cremona's Summa de officiis or Summa de poenitentia
- Gerard of Sesso, incipit Ne transgrediaris, c. 1200
- William of Auxerre's Summa Aurea, 1220
- Thomas Aquinas' Summa Theologiae, 1274
- Thomas Aquinas' Summa contra Gentiles
- Alexander of Hales' Summa Theologiae, 13th century
- Gerard of Bologna's Summa Theologiae, 1317
- Francesc Eiximenis' Summa Theologica (fragments). 14th century
