= Dallas Medieval Texts and Translations =

Dallas Medieval Texts and Translations is a book series founded at the University of Dallas and currently co-sponsored by the University of Dallas and the University of Kentucky. The series is published by Peeters, a publishing house based in Leuven, Belgium. Modeled upon the Loeb Classical Library, the Dallas series has the goal "to build a library of medieval Latin texts, with English translations, from the period roughly between 500 and 1500, that will represent the whole breadth and variety of medieval civilization." The editorial board of the series is composed of several medievalists from the University of Dallas and Southern Methodist University; Kelly Gibson of the University of Dallas and Philipp W. Rosemann at the University of Kentucky serve as co-editors. Members of an international board of editorial advisers review manuscripts submitted to the series to ensure their quality.

The first volume of the series appeared in 2002; as of July, 2026, thirty-five volumes have been published, while twenty more are in preparation. In November, 2010, Harvard University Press launched a similar project, the Dumbarton Oaks Medieval Library. It is different from the Dallas series in that it also publishes texts in Byzantine Greek and Old English.

== List of published volumes ==
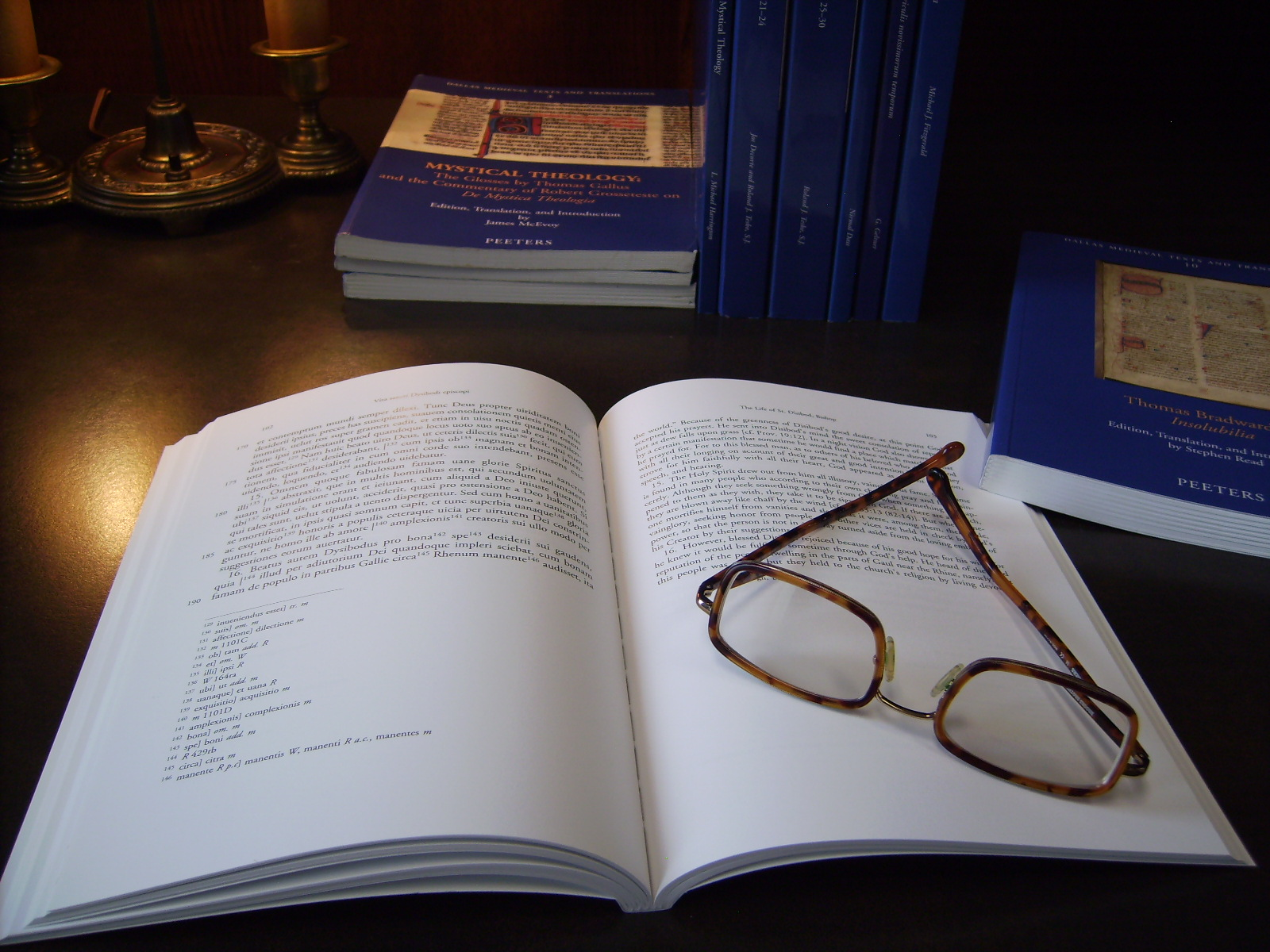
Facing pages of Latin text and English translation in vol. 11 of Dallas Medieval Texts and Translations

- vol. 1: Manegold of Lautenbach, Liber contra Wolfelmum. Translated with an Introduction and Notes by Robert Ziomkowski. xvi-152 pp., ISBN 978-90-429-1192-5.
- vol. 2: Ranulph Higden, Ars componendi sermones. Translated by Margaret Jennings and Sally A. Wilson. Introduction and Notes by Margaret Jennings. x-76 pp., ISBN 978-90-429-1242-7.
- vol. 3: Mystical Theology: The Glosses by Thomas Gallus and the Commentary of Robert Grosseteste on "De Mystica Theologia." Edition, Translation, and Introduction by James McEvoy. xii-139 pp., ISBN 978-90-429-1310-3.
- vol. 4: A Thirteenth-Century Textbook of Mystical Theology at the University of Paris: The "Mystical Theology" of Dionysius the Areopagite in Eriugena's Latin Translation with the Scholia translated by Anastasius the Librarian and Excerpts from Eriugena's "Periphyseon." Edition, Translation, and Introduction by L. Michael Harrington. xii-127 pp., ISBN 978-90-429-1394-3.
- vol. 5: Henry of Ghent's "Summa": The Questions on God's Existence and Essence (Articles 21-24). Translation by Jos Decorte (†) and Roland J. Teske, S.J. Latin Text, Introduction, and Notes by Roland J. Teske, S.J. x-290 pp., ISBN 978-90-429-1590-9.
- vol. 6: Henry of Ghent's "Summa": The Questions on God's Unity and Simplicity (Articles 25-30). Latin Text, Introduction, Translation, and Notes by Roland J. Teske, S.J. xi-388 pp., ISBN 978-90-429-1811-5.
- vol. 7: Viking Attacks on Paris: The "Bella parisiacae urbis" of Abbo of Saint-Germain-des-Prés. Edition, Translation, and Introduction by Nirmal Dass. x-130 pp., ISBN 978-90-429-1916-7.
- vol. 8: William of Saint-Amour, De periculis novissimorum temporum. Edition, Translation, and Introduction by G. Geltner. xiv-157 pp., ISBN 978-90-429-2010-1.
- vol. 9: Albert of Saxony, Quaestiones circa logicam (Twenty-Five Disputed Questions on Logic). Introduction, Translation, and Notes by Michael J. Fitzgerald. x-261 pp., ISBN 978-90-429-2074-3.
- vol. 10: Thomas Bradwardine, Insolubilia. Edition, Translation, and Introduction by Stephen Read. ix-236 pp., ISBN 978-90-429-2317-1.
- vol. 11: Hildegard of Bingen, Two Hagiographies: Vita sancti Rupperti confessoris, Vita sancti Dysibodi episcopi. Introduction and Translation by Hugh Feiss, O.S.B. Edition by Christopher P. Evans. x-163 pp., ISBN 978-90-429-2318-8.
- vol. 12: On the Ecclesiastical Hierarchy: The Thirteenth-Century Textbook Edition. Edition, Translation, and Introduction by L. Michael Harrington. xiv-296 pp., ISBN 978-90-429-2481-9.
- vol. 13.1: Ranulph Higden, "Speculum curatorum"/A Mirror for Curates, Book I: The Commandments. Introduction, Edition, and Translation by Eugene Crook and Margaret Jennings. xvi-444 pp., ISBN 978-90-429-2487-1.
- vol. 13.2: Ranulph Higden, "Speculum curatorum"/A Mirror for Curates, Book II: The Capital Sins. Introduction, Edition, and Translation by Eugene Crook and Margaret Jennings. xiii-406 pp., ISBN 978-90-429-3330-9.
- vol. 13.3: Ranulph Higden, "Speculum curatorum"/A Mirror for Curates, Book III: The Sacraments, Part 1: Chapters 1–69. Introduction, Edition, and Translation by Eugene Crook and Margaret Jennings. xi-590 pp., ISBN 978-90-429-5187-7.
- vol. 13.4: Ranulph Higden, "Speculum curatorum"/A Mirror for Curates, Book III: The Sacraments, Part 2: Chapters 70–109. Introduction, Edition, and Translation by Eugene Crook and Margaret Jennings. ix-436 pp., ISBN 978-90-429-5273-7.
- vol. 14: Robert Grosseteste at Munich: The "Abbreviatio" by Frater Andreas, O.F.M., of the Commentaries by Robert Grosseteste on the Pseudo-Dionysius. Edition, Translation, and Introduction by James McEvoy. Prepared for Publication by Philipp W. Rosemann. x-131 pp., ISBN 978-90-429-2560-1.
- vol. 15: Boncompagno da Signa, Amicitia and De malo senectutis et senii. Edition, Translation, and Introduction by Michael W. Dunne. ix-166 pp., ISBN 978-90-429-2608-0.
- vol. 16: Hans Geybels, Adelmann of Liège and the Eucharistic Controversy. xi-140 pp., ISBN 978-90-429-2682-0.
- vol. 17: William of Auvergne, Rhetorica divina, seu ars oratoria eloquentiae divinae. Introduction, Text, Translation, and Notes by Roland J. Teske, S.J. xiii-465 pp., ISBN 978-90-429-2844-2.
- vol. 18: Adam of Saint-Victor, Sequences. Introduction, Text, Translation, and Notes by Juliet Mousseau, R.S.C.J. With a Foreword by Hugh Feiss, O.S.B. xv-247 pp., ISBN 978-90-429-2895-4.
- vol. 19: Paul the Deacon, Liber de episcopis Mettensibus. Edition, Translation, and Introduction by Damien Kempf. xii-95 pp., ISBN 978-90-429-2937-1.
- vol. 20: The Notory Art of Shorthand (Ars notoria notarie): A Curious Chapter in the History of Writing in the West. Introduction, Edition, and Translation by John Haines. xiii-190 pp., ISBN 978-90-429-3068-1.
- vol. 21: Thomas Aquinas, De unione Verbi incarnati. Introduction, Translation, and Notes by Roger W. Nutt. Latin Text by Walter Senner, O.P., Barbara Bartocci, and Klaus Obenauer. With a Foreword by John F. Boyle. xi-157 pp., ISBN 978-90-429-3197-8.
- vol. 22: Waltharius. Edition, Translation, and Introduction by Abram Ring. ix-198 pp., ISBN 978-90-429-3354-5.
- vol. 23: Bonaventure, On the Eucharist (Commentary on the "Sentences," Book IV, dist. 8–13). Edition, Translation, and Introduction by Junius Johnson. xiv-474 pp., ISBN 978-90-429-3454-2.
- vol. 24.1: Robert Rypon, Selected Sermons, vol. 1: Feast Days and Saints' Days. Edition, Translation, and Introduction by Holly Johnson. ix-375 pp., ISBN 978-90-429-3988-2.
- vol. 25: Henry of Ghent’s "Summa": The Questions on Human Knowledge (Articles 2–5). Text from the Leuven Edition. Translation, Introduction, and Notes by Juan Carlos Flores. x-229 pp., ISBN 978-90-429-4557-9.
- vol. 26: Education of Nuns, Feast of Fools, Letters of Love: Medieval Religious Life in Twelfth-Century Lyric Anthologies from Regensburg, Ripoll, and Chartres. Edition, Translation, and Introduction by David A. Traill and Justin Haynes. xii-184 pp. ISBN 978-90-429-4594-4.
- vol. 27: Paul of Venice, Logica Magna: The Treatise on Insolubles. Edited with an Introduction, English Translation, and Commentary by Stephen Read and Barbara Bartocci. xi+448 pp., ISBN 978-90-429-4940-9.
- vol. 28: Nithard, Histories. Edition, Translation, and Introduction by Marco Conti. With a Foreword by Thomas F. X. Noble. xiv-219 pp., ISBN 978-90-429-4942-3.
- vol. 29: Gregory of Tours, The Book of the Miracles of the Blessed Andrew the Apostle. Introduction by Burnam W. Reynolds. Translation by Randy R. Richardson. With a Foreword by Raymond Van Dam. xviii-132 pp., ISBN 978-90-429-4966-9.
- vol. 30: Smaragdus of Saint-Mihiel, Via regia. Introduction and Edition by Matthew Ponesse. Translation and Notes by James Francis LePree. xvi-239 pp., ISBN 978-90-429-5040-5.
- vol. 31.1: Alexander of Hales, Gloss on the "Sentences" of Peter Lombard, Book I, dist. 1–18. Text from the Quaracchi Edition. Translation, Introduction, and Notes by Aaron M. Gies. xxii-352 pp., ISBN 978-90-429-5363-5.
- vol. 32.1: Pseudo-Arnald of Villanova, Alchemical Treatises. Introduction, Edition, and Translation by Andrew Rabin. x-205 pp., ISBN 978-90-429-5411-3.

The series has also published a commemorative booklet to honor its longtime contributor, the late Professor Margaret Jennings:

- "I am myn owene woman, wel at ese": In Memory of Margaret Jennings. Contributions by Francis P. Kilcoyne, Mary Florence Burns, C.S.J., Eugene Crook, Michael Haren, and Siegfried Wenzel. With Margaret Jennings's Essay "Eyewitness: Ranulph Higden and the Troubling Events at Chester Monastery." viii-45 pp. ISBN 978-90-429-3494-8.
