= Hugh Ripelin of Strasburg =

French Dominican theologian

Hugh Ripelin of Strasburg (c. 1205 – c. 1270) was a Dominican theologian from Strasbourg, Alsace. He is now considered to be the author of the Compendium theologiae or Compendium theologicae veritatis. On account of its scope and style, as well as its practical arrangement, it was for 400 years used as a textbook. It may have been the most widely read theological work of the later Middle Ages, in western Europe. In 1232 a sale of land to Hugo von Ripelin, then the paddock prior of the Dominican Predigerkloster in Zürich, is mentioned.

== The Compendium ==
By reason of its extensive use and wide circulation it was often copied and later more often printed and reprinted. The work consists of seven books which treat of the Creation, the Fall, the Incarnation, Grace, the Sacraments, and the Last Four Things. In the entire medieval literature there is probably no work whose composition has in the past been attributed to so many different authors. It is now dated to 1268.

The incunabula of Venice, Lyons, Strasbourg, Ulm, and Nuremberg enumerated by Ludwig Hain are without the author's name. Some attribute it to the Dominican Ulrich of Strasburg. Bach in the Kirchenlexicon (I, 427) make Albert of Strasburg the author, but recent researches go to show that such a person never existed.

Thomas Dorinberg, who supplied the edition of 1473 with an index, was for a long time looked upon as the author; others attributed it to Thomas Aquinas. In the magnificent edition of Lyons (1557), furnished with notes and index by the Franciscan John of Combes, it is credited to the Dominican Albert the Great and is placed in the folio edition of the latter's works published at Lyons (1651). Again, some held Bonaventure to be its author, with the result that the Compendium found a place in the appendix of the eighth volume of his works (Rome, 1588–96).

Among other theologians to whom it was ascribed are Hugh of Saint Cher, Alexander of Hales, Aureolus, the Oxford Dominican Thomas of Sutton, Peter of Tarantasia and others.

== Other works ==
The Compendium most probably, if not certainly, was written by Hugh of Strasburg. Other works attributed to him are: "Commentarium in IV libros sententiarum"; "Quodlibeta, quaestiones, disputationes et variae in divinos libros explanationes".
