= Teske =

Teske is a surname. Notable people with the surname include:

- Charlotte Teske (born 1949), German long-distance runner
- Edmund Teske (1911–1996), American photographer
- Jon Teske (born 1997), American professional basketball player
- Johann Gottfried Teske, (1704 – 1772), Prussian physicist and philosopher
- Robert Teske (born 1990), German politician
- Roland J. Teske (1934–2015), American Roman-Catholic priest
- Werner Teske (1942–1981), German Hauptmann (Captain) of the Ministry for State Security (Stasi)
