= Ibn Malka al-Baghdadi =

12th-century Iraqi Islamic philosopher, physicist and physician

Abu'l-Barakāt Hibat Allah ibn Malkā al-Baghdādī
- Title: Awḥad al-Zamān (Unique One of his Time)

Personal life
- Born: c. 1080 CE Balad (near Mosul, present-day Iraq)
- Died: 1164 or 1165 CE Baghdad, present-day Iraq
- Era: Islamic Golden Age
- Region: Islamic civilization
- Main interest(s): Islamic philosophy, medicine
- Notable idea(s): Physics of motion, concept of time

Religious life
- Religion: Islam
- Creed: Aristotelianism

Muslim leader
- Influenced by: Ibn Sina Abu’l Hasan Sa’id ibn Hibat Allah (teacher)
- Influenced: Fakhr al-Din al-Razi Samauʼal Al-Maghribī Isaac son of Abraham Ibn Ezra Shahab al-Din Suhrawardi Ibn Kammuna Jean Buridan Albert of Saxony

Abu'l-Barakāt Hibat Allah ibn Malkā al-Baghdādī (Arabic: أبو البركات هبة الله بن ملكا البغدادي; c. 1080 – 1164 or 1165 CE) was an Islamic philosopher, physician and physicist of Jewish descent from Baghdad, Iraq. Abu'l-Barakāt, an older contemporary of Maimonides, was originally known by his Hebrew birth name Baruch ben Malka and was given the name of Nathanel by his pupil Isaac ben Ezra before his conversion from Judaism to Islam later in his life.

His writings include the anti-Aristotelian philosophical work Kitāb al-Muʿtabar ("The Book of What Has Been Established by Personal Reflection"); a philosophical commentary on the Kohelet; and the treatise "On the Reason Why the Stars Are Visible at Night and Hidden in Daytime". Abu'l-Barakāt was an Aristotelian philosopher who in many respects followed Ibn Sina, but also developed his own ideas. He proposed an explanation of the acceleration of falling bodies by the accumulation of successive increments of power with successive increments of velocity.

His thought influenced the Illuminationist school of classical Islamic philosophy, the medieval Jewish philosopher Ibn Kammuna, and the medieval Christian philosophers Jean Buridan and Albert of Saxony.

== Life ==
Abu'l-Barakāt, famed as Awḥad al-Zamān (Unique One of his Time), was born in Balad, a town on the Tigris above Mosul in modern-day Iraq. As a renowned physician, he served at the courts of the caliphs of Baghdad and the Seljuk sultans.

He converted to Islam later in his life. Abu'l Barakat does not refer to his conversion in his writings, and the historical sources give contradictory episodes of his conversion. According to the various reports, he converted either out of "wounded pride", fear of the personal consequences of the death of Sultan Mahmud's wife while under his care as a physician or fear of execution when he was taken prisoner in a battle between the armies of the caliph and that of the sultan. Ayala Eliyahu argues that the conversion was "probably motivated by convenience reasons".

Isaac, the son of the Abraham Ibn Ezra and the son-in-law of Judah Halevi, was one of his pupils, to whom Abu'l-Barakāt, Jewish at the time, dictated a long philosophical commentary on Ecclesiastes, written in Arabic using the Hebrew alphabet. Isaac wrote a poem in his honour as introduction to this work.

== Philosophy ==
=== Experimental method ===
Al-Baghdadi described an early scientific method emphasizing repeated experimentation, influenced by Ibn Sina, as follows:

"Because of the frequency of the experience, these judgements may be regarded as certain, even without our knowing the reason [for the phenomenon]. For there is certain knowledge that the effect in question is not due to chance. It must accordingly be supposed that it is due to nature or to some modality thereof. Thus the cause qua cause, though not its species or mode of operation, is known. For experimental science is also constituted by a knowledge of the cause and by an induction based on all the data of sensation; whereby a general science is reached. ... But in the cases in which an experiment has not been completed, because of its not having been repeated in such a way that the persons, the time and the circumstances varied in everything that did not cause the determining cause, whereas this cause [remained invariable], the experiment does not prove certain knowledge, but only probably opinion."

=== Motion ===
Al-Baghdadi was a follower of the scientific and philosophical teachings of Ibn Sina. According to Alistair Cameron Crombie, al-Baghdadi

proposed an explanation of the acceleration of falling bodies by the accumulation of successive increments of power with successive increments of velocity.

According to Shlomo Pines, al-Baghdadi's theory of motion was thus

the oldest negation of Aristotle's fundamental dynamic law [namely, that a constant force produces a uniform motion], [and is thus an] anticipation in a vague fashion of the fundamental law of classical mechanics [namely, that a force applied continuously produces acceleration].

Al-Baghdadi's theory of motion distinguished between velocity and acceleration and showed that force is proportional to acceleration rather than velocity. Abu'l-Barakat also developed Philoponus' theory of impetus, stating that the mover imparts a violent inclination (mayl qasri) on the moved and that this diminishes as the moving object distances itself from the mover.

Al-Baghdadi also suggested that motion is relative, writing that "there is motion only if the relative positions of the bodies in question change." He also stated that "each type of body has a characteristic velocity that reaches its maximum when its motion encounters no resistance."

=== Space and time ===
Al-Baghdadi criticized Aristotle's concept of time as "the measure of motion" and instead redefines the concept with his own definition of time as "the measure of being", thus distinguishing between space and time, and reclassifying time as a metaphysical concept rather than a physical one. The scholar Y. Tzvi Langermann writes:

Dissatisfied with the regnant approach, which treated time as an accident of the cosmos, al-Baghdadi drew the conclusion that time is an entity whose conception (ma'qul al-zaman) is a priori and almost as general as that of being, encompassing the sensible and the non-sensible, that which moves and that which is at rest. Our idea of time results not from abstraction, stripping accidents from perceived objects, but from a mental representation based on an innate idea. Al-Baghdadi stops short of offering a precise definition of time, stating only that 'were it to be said that time is the measure of being (miqdar al-wujud), that would be better than saying [as Aristotle does] that it is the measure of motion'. His reclassification of time as a subject for metaphysics rather than for physics represents a major conceptual shift, not a mere formalistic correction. It also breaks the traditional linkage between time and space. Concerning space, al-Baghdadi held unconventional views as well, but he did not remove its investigation from the domain of physics.

In his view, there is just one time which is similar for all beings, including God. Abu'l-Barakāt also regarded space as three-dimensional and infinite.

=== Psychology ===
He upheld the unity of the soul, denying that there is a distinction between it and the intellect. For him, the soul's awareness of itself is the definitive proof that the soul is independent of the body and will not perish with it. On his contributions to Islamic psychology, Langermann writes:

Al-Baghdadi's most significant departure in psychology concerns human self-awareness. Ibn Sina had raised the issue of our consciousness of our own psychic activities, but he had not fully pursued the implications for Aristotelian psychology of his approach. Al-Baghdadi took the matter much further, dispensing with the traditional psychological faculties and pressing his investigations in the direction of what we would call the unconscious.

== Works ==
He wrote a critique of Aristotelian philosophy and Aristotelian physics entitled Kitab al-Mu'tabar (the title may be translated as "The Book of What Has Been Established by Personal Reflection"). According to Abu'l-Barakāt, Kitāb al-Muʿtabar consists in the main of critical remarks jotted down by him over the years while reading philosophical text, and published at the insistence of his friends, in the form of a philosophical work. The work "presented a serious philosophical alternative to, and criticism of, Ibn Sina". He also developed concepts which resemble several modern theories in physics.

Abu'l-Barakāt also wrote a short treatise on the intellect, Kitāb Ṣaḥiḥ adillat al-naql fī māhiyyat al-ʻaql (صحيح أدلة النقل في ماهية العقل), which has been edited by Ahmad El-Tayeb.

All that we possess in the way of medical writing by Abu'l-Barakāt are a few prescriptions for remedies. These remain in manuscript and are as yet unstudied.

== Legacy ==
Abu'l-Barakāt's thought had an influence on some Islamic philosophers but little on Jewish thought. His works were not translated into Hebrew, and he is seldom cited in Jewish philosophy, probably because of his conversion to Islam. Ibn Taymiyyah heavily borrowed from the arguments of Ibn Malka and augmented them by propositions later made by Maimonides.

The famous theologian and philosopher Fakhr al-Din al-Razi was one of Abu'l-Barakāt's eminent disciples. The influence of Al-Baghdadi's views appears especially in Al-Razi's chief work Al-Mabāḥith al-Mashriqiyyah (Oriental Discourses). Abu'l-Barakāt influenced certain conceptions of Suhrawardi.

== See also ==
- Physics in medieval Islam
- Ibn Bajjah
- Fakhr al-Din al-Razi
- Shahab al-Din Suhrawardi
