= Ad fructus uberes =

1281 Catholic papal bull

Ad fructus uberes (Abundant fruits) was a papal bull issued by Pope Martin IV on 13 December 1281. It affirmed the right of friars to hear confessions and preach without the authorization of secular clergy. The bull was met with fierce opposition from French bishops in particular, who questioned if it contradicted Omnius utriusque sexus (the canon passed by the Fourth Council of the Lateran which mandated yearly confession to a parish priest).

At the same time, Ad fructus uberes itself contained a reminder of Omnius utriusque sexus. This thus triggered a debate between theologians about whether or not Martin had intended for sins already confessed to friars to be reconfessed to parish priests. In his fifth quodlibet delivered just prior to the bull's publication, Henry of Ghent argued that the church did not have the authority to overwrite natural law. He rehashed this argument in response to Ad fructus uberes, and added that yearly confession to a parish priest was still compulsory, even if one chose to confess to a friar. On the other hand, mendicant thinkers such as Richard of Middleton maintained that God could modify preexisting church traditions according to the evolving needs of the laity.

Serious efforts to overturn the bull continued well into the pontificate of Pope Nicholas IV. In December 1286, for instance, a synod of four archbishops and twenty-four bishops convened in Paris to discuss the abrogation of Ad fructus uberes. In 1290, Nicholas endorsed the mendicant-friendly reading of Ad fructus uberes, and forbade further discussion of the bull. Henry of Ghent protested this ruling, and reiterated that the pope lacked the absolute right to grant privileges, especially if they conflicted with divine law. As a result, Henry was suspended temporarily by papal legate Benedict Gaetani (the future Pope Boniface VIII) from teaching at the University of Paris.

Following his assumption of the papacy, Boniface published the bull Super cathedram in 1300, which ruled that mendicant pastoral care required secular authorization. Moreover, Boniface clarified that friars could not preach anything that contradicted the sermons of parish priests, nor could they absolve mortal sins.

== Sources ==
- Bernstein, Alan E. (1978). "Magisterium and License: Corporate Autonomy Against Papal Authority in the Medieval University of Paris". Viator. 9: 291–307. doi:10.1484/J.VIATOR.2.301551.
- Fasolt, Constantin (2002). Council and Hierarchy: The Political Thought of William Durant the Younger. Cambridge University Press. ISBN 9780521392853.
- Kempshall, M. S. (1999). The Common Good in Late Medieval Political Thought. Oxford University Press. ISBN 9780191677526.
- Linehan, Peter (1997). The Ladies of Zamora. Manchester University Press. ISBN 9780719050459.
- Marrone, John (1974). "The Absolute and the Ordained Powers of the Pope: An Unedited Text of Henry of Ghent". Mediaeval Studies. 36: 7–27. doi:10.1484/J.MS.2.306154.
- Post, Gaines (1936). "A Petition Relating to the Bull Ad Fructus Uberes and the Opposition of the French Secular Clergy in 1282". Speculum. 11 (2): 231–237. doi:10.2307/2846528. JSTOR 2846528. S2CID 159665518.
- Steinberg, Justin (2013). Dante and the Limits of the Law. University of Chicago Press. ISBN 9780226071121.
- Sullivan, Thomas (2019). "'A Claim on Their Gratitude': Portrait Panels in the New Library of the Sorbonne". In Mordechai Feingold (ed.). History of Universities. Vol. 31. Oxford University Press. pp. 23–47. ISBN 9780198835509.
- Traver, Andrew (2011). "The Forging of an Intellectual Defence of Mendicacy in the Medieval University". In Donald Prudlo (ed.). The Origin, Development, and Refinement of Medieval Religious Mendicancies. BRILL. pp. 157–195. ISBN 9789004181809.
- Wilson, Gordon (1993). "Henry of Ghent's Quodlibet VII as a Source for Richard of Mediavilla's Quaestio Privilegii papae Martini". Franciscan Studies. 53: 97–120. doi:10.1353/frc.1993.0011. S2CID 161802571.
