= Odo Rigaud =

Former archbishop of Rouen

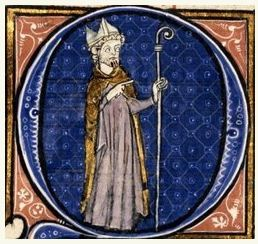
Odo Rigaud

Odo Rigaud (sometimes Eudes Rigaud, Eudes II Rigaud, Odo Rigaldi, or Eudes Rigaldi) (c. 1210 - 1275) was a university lecturer, member of the Franciscan order, and the Archbishop of Rouen from 1247 until his death in 1275.

== Life ==
Rigaud was born into a family of minor nobility in the Île de France around the year 1210, and became a lecturer in the 1230s. While at the University of Paris, Rigaud initially studied the liberal arts and theology under the tutelage of Alexander of Hales. He joined the Franciscan order in 1236, and became a master of theology in 1242. Rigaud was elected as archbishop of Rouen by a cathedral chapter in 1247, becoming the first Franciscan friar to do so. In March 1248, he was consecrated by Pope Innocent IV in Lyon. Rigaud, like many theologians of his time, composed an, albeit incomplete, commentary on the Sentences in three installments, though a fourth installment which completes his work is alleged to exist. The unique theological perspectives contained within—particularly those regarding free will—are purported to have inspired Albert Magnus, Bonaventure, and Thomas Aquinas, all of whom read the commentary.

In 1270, Rigaud embarked on the Eighth Crusade under the command of Louis IX of France. He was present when the king died of dysentery later that same year, and was personally responsible for overseeing the return of his body to France from Tunis. Evidently, Rigaud was a close friend of the king before his death, and was previously involved in negotiating the Treaty of Paris between England and France in 1259, successfully ending the First Hundred Years' War. Rigaud died five years following Louis' crusade in the year of 1275.
