= Roland J. Teske =

American Catholic priest and philosopher (1934–2015)

Roland J. Teske, S.J. (October 29, 1934 – May 18, 2015) was an American Jesuit priest. Teske was also a medievalist and philosopher and professor emeritus of philosophy at Marquette University. He published several books about medieval philosophy and theology, and translated and prepared English translations of their work, specializing in St. Augustine's philosophical and religious views and the work of the later philosopher William of Auvergne, Bishop of Paris.

== Bibliography ==
=== Scholarly English translations of St. Augustine ===
- On Genesis: Two Books on Genesis against the Manichees; and, On the Literal Interpretation of Genesis, an Unfinished Book. (Translation of: De Genesi contra Manichaeos and De Genesi ad litteram imperfectus.) Washington, D.C.: Catholic University of America Press, 1990. ISBN 9780813211848
- with John E. Rotelle Augustine, Saint Bishop of Hippo Priscillianists and Origenists; Arian sermon; Answer to an Arian sermon; Debate with Maximinus; Answer to Maximinus; Answer to an enemy of the Law and the Prophets OCLC 34165347
- with John E. Rotelle, Answer to the Pelagians. II, Marriage and desire; Answer to the two letters of the Pelagians; Answer to Julian ISBN 9781565481077
- with John E. Rotelle, Answer to the Pelagians. III, Unfinished work in answer to Julian Hyde Park, N.Y. : New City Press, 1999 ISBN 9781565481299
- with John E. Rotelle, Answer to the Pelagians. IV, To the monks of Hadrumetum and Provence Publisher: Hyde Park, N.Y. : New City Press, 1999 ISBN 9781565481367
- with Boniface Ramsey, The Manichean Debate. Hyde Park, N.Y.: New City Press, 2006.

=== Scholarly English translations of other philosophers ===
- Henry of Ghent. Quodlibetal Questions on Free Will. Milwaukee, Wis: Marquette University Press, 1993. ISBN 9780585141206
- William of Auvergne The Trinity, or, The first principle Publisher: Milwaukee, Wis. : Marquette University Press, 1989 ISBN 9780874622317
- William of Auvergne, On the Virtues Part One of On the Virtues and Vices. Milwaukee, Wis: Marquette University Press, 2009.
- William of Auvergne, The Universe of Creatures. Milwaukee: Marquette University Press, 1998.
- William of Auvergne, The providence of God regarding the universe : part three of the first principal part of The universe of creatures Milwaukee, Wis. : Marquette University Press, 2007.
- William of Auvergne,The immortality of the soul = De immortalitate animae Milwaukee, Wis. : Marquette University Press, 1991
- Roberto Francesco Romolo Bellarmino (with John Patrick Donnelly), Spiritual writings New York : Paulist Press, 1989.

=== Monographs ===
- To Know God and the Soul: Essays on the Thought of Saint Augustine. Washington, D.C.: Catholic University of America Press, 2008.
- Studies in the Philosophy of William of Auvergne, Bishop of Paris (1228-1249) Milwaukee, Wis. : Marquette University Press, 2006 ISBN 9780874626742

=== Edited volumes ===
- co-edited with Lienhard, Joseph T. and Earl C. Muller, Augustine: Presbyter Factus Sum. New York: P. Lang, 1993.
