= Middle English Story of Genesis and Exodus =

Anonymous English vernacular poem circa 1250

The Middle English Story of Genesis and Exodus is an anonymous English vernacular poem written in Norfolk around 1250. In 4162 lines of verse, it runs from the creation of the world until the death of Moses.

== Text sample ==
The following passage is interesting for containing the earliest reference to the Firmament of Heaven in the English language.

On an oðer dai ðis middel-erd,
was al luken and a-buten sperd;
ðo god bad ben ðe firmament,
Al abuten ðis walkne sent,
Of waters froren, of yses wal,
ðis middel werld it luket al;—
May no fir get melten ðat ys;
He ðe it made is migtful and wis,—
It mai ben hoten heuene-Rof;
It hiled al ðis werldes drof,
And fier, and walkne, and water, and lond,
Al is bi-luken in godes hond,
Til domes-dai ne sal it troken.

—Story of Genesis and Exodus, verses 93–105
Translation:

The second day, this Middle Earth
Was all locked and barred;
Then God commanded the firmament to exist,
All around this he dispatched air
Full of frozen water, walls of ice,
Which locked in this middle World completely
So that no fire should melt the ice.
He who made it is mighty and wise.
It was to be called “Heaven’s Roof”
It healed all the troubles of this world,
And fire and air and water and earth,
All are held safe in God’s hand,
Till Judgment Day it will not fail.

== Availability ==
There is a modern critical edition by the Swedish linguist Olof Arngart. The 19th-century edition by Morris is available on Project Gutenberg.

== Sources ==
- Arngart, Olof (1968). The Middle English Genesis and Exodus re-edited from MS CCCC444 with introduction, notes and glossary. Lund: C. W. K. Gleerup.
- Birch, Dinah (2009). "Genesis and Exodus". Oxford Companion to English Literature Online.
- Morris, Richard (1865). The story of Genesis and Exodus, an early English song, about A.D. 1250. Publications of the Early English Text Society. London: Trübner & Co.; on Project Gutenberg; on Internet Archive.
