= Hugh of Saint-Cher =

French biblical scholar (c. 1200–1263)

His Eminence Hugh of Saint-Cher O.P.
- Cardinal Priest of Santa Sabina (1244–1261); Cardinal Bishop of Ostia (1261–1262); Cardinal Priest of Santa Sabina (1262–1263)
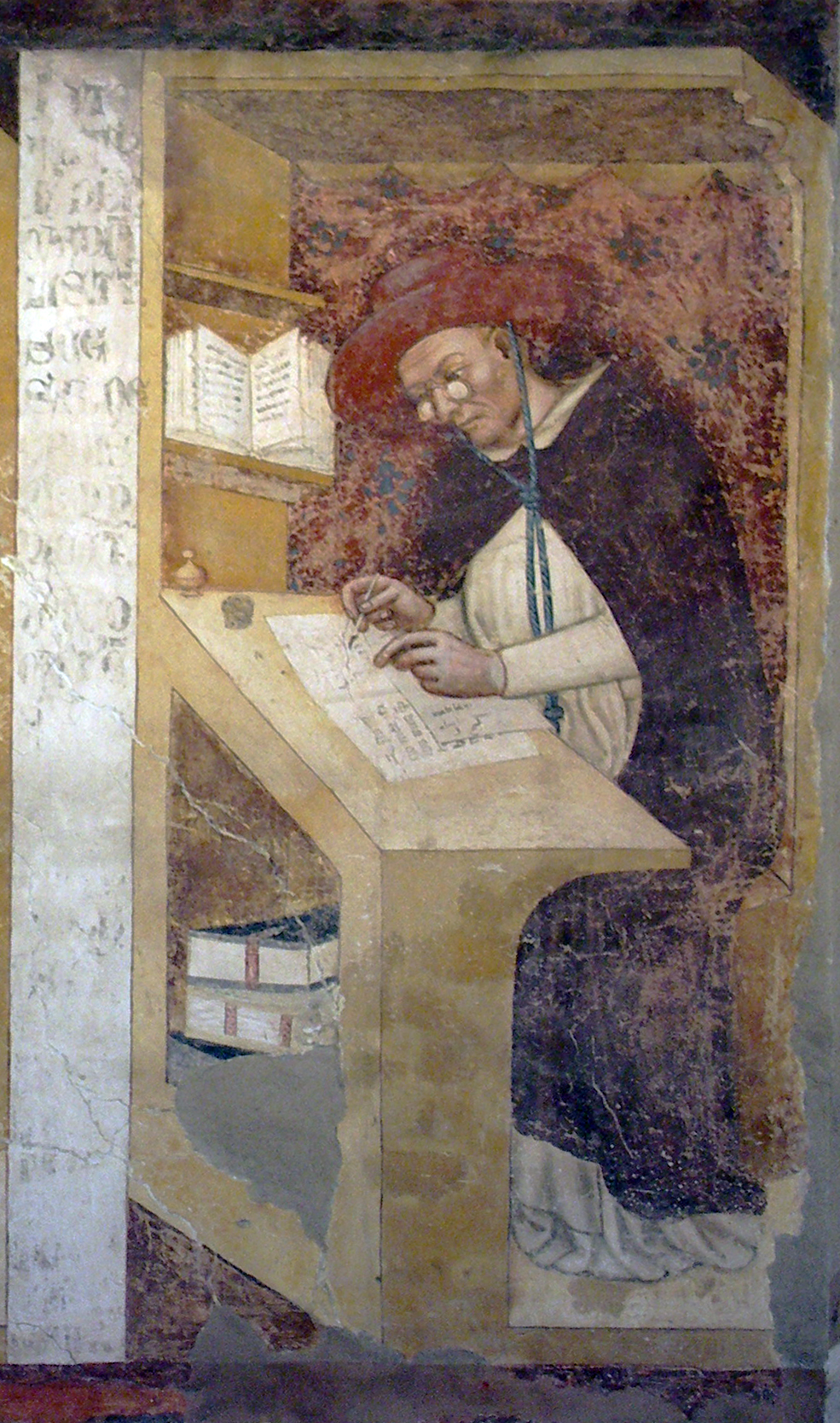
- Province: Rome
- See: Bishop of Ostia
- Installed: 1261
- Term ended: 1262
- Predecessor: Rinaldo di Jenne
- Successor: Henry of Segusio

Orders
- Ordination: c. 1227 by Pope Gregory IX
- Consecration: 1261 by Pope Alexander IV
- Created cardinal: 1244 by Pope Innocent IV

Personal details
- Born: c. 1200 Saint-Cher, Dauphiné
- Died: 19 March 1263 Orvieto, Papal States
- Denomination: Roman Catholic

Hugh of Saint-Cher, O.P. (Latin: Hugo de Sancto Charo; c. 1200 – 19 March 1263) was a French Dominican friar who became a cardinal and noted biblical commentator.

== Life ==
Hugh was born at Saint-Cher, a suburb of Vienne, Dauphiné, around the beginning of the 13th century. After completing his early studies at a local monastery near his home, at about the age of fourteen, he went to the University of Paris to study philosophy, theology, and jurisprudence, which latter subject he later taught in the same city.

In 1225, he entered the Dominican priory there and took the religious habit of the recently founded Order. Soon after his admission, he was appointed as Prior Provincial of the Order for France. In 1230 he became Master of Theology and was elected prior of the Paris monastery. During those years, he contributed largely to the Order's success, and won the confidence of Pope Gregory IX, who sent him as a papal legate to Constantinople in 1233.

== Cardinalate ==
Pope Innocent IV made Hugh a Cardinal Priest as the first of the Dominican order in 1244, with his titular church being Santa Sabina, the mother church of the Dominican Order. He then played an important part in the First Council of Lyons, which took place the following year. He contributed to the institution of the Feast of Corpus Christi on the General Roman Calendar. In 1247, upon instructions of Pope Innocent, Hugh revised the Carmelite Rule of St. Albert, which the Saint Albert Avogadro, Latin Patriarch of Jerusalem, had given the first Carmelite friars on Mount Carmel. The Holy See felt it necessary to mitigate some of the Rule's more demanding elements to make it more compatible with conditions in Europe. The same pope approved these changes, and this revision remains the Rule for the Carmelite Order. After the death in 1250 of the Holy Roman Emperor Frederick II, Pope Innocent sent Hugh to Germany as his legate for the election of a successor.

Under the authority of Pope Alexander IV, in 1255 Hugh supervised the commission that condemned the Introductorius in Evangelium aeternum of Gherardino da Borgo San Donnino, which promoted the teachings of Abbot Joachim of Fiore. These teachings worried the bishops as they had become widespread among the "Spiritual" wing of the Franciscan friars, to which Gherardino belonged.

He also supervised the condemnation of William of St Amour's De periculis novissimorum temporum. This work was an expression of the attack on the mendicant Orders, who were becoming so successful in the lives of the universities, by the secular clergy who had previously had unchallenged authority there. Hugh served as Major Penitentiary of the Catholic Church from 1256 to 1262. He was named Cardinal Bishop of Ostia in December 1261, but resigned a few months later and returned to his title of Santa Sabina.

Hugh was in residence in Orvieto, Italy, with Pope Urban IV, who had established a long-term residence there, when he died on 19 March 1263.

== Works ==
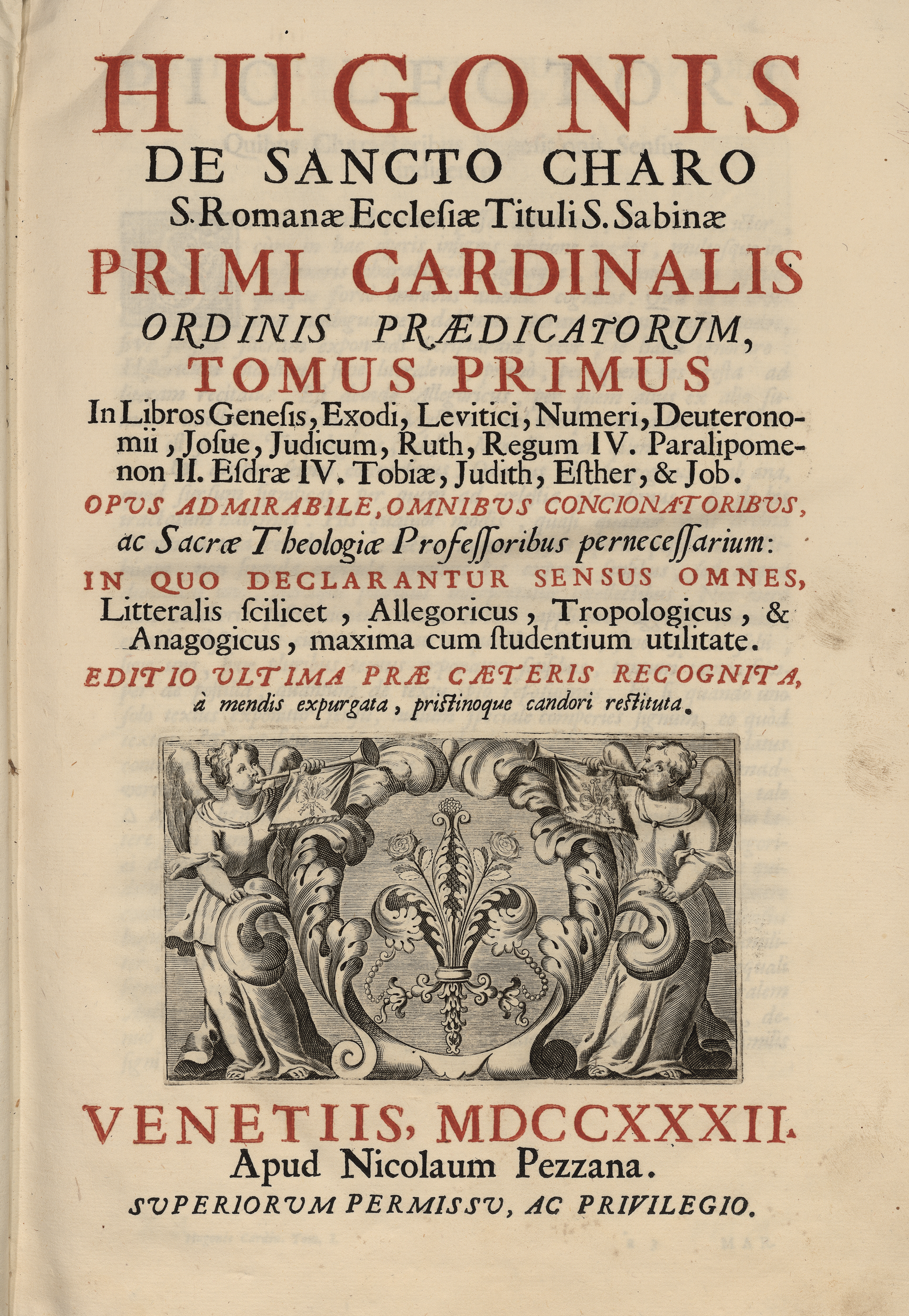
In universum Vetus et Novum Testamentum, 1732

Hugh of St-Cher (or, possibly, a team of scholars under his direction) was the first to compile a so-called "correctorium", a collection of variant readings of the Bible. His work, entitled "Correctio Biblie", survives in more than a dozen manuscripts.

In the preface to the "Correctio Biblie", Hugh writes that he has collated various Latin versions and biblical commentaries, as well as the Hebrew manuscripts. For his approach to the text of the Bible, he was criticised by William de la Mare, author of another correctorium.

His commentary on Peter Lombard's Book of Sentences exercised significant influence over subsequent generations of theologians. The works introduced for the first time the distinction between God's unconditioned potence (in Latin: potentia absoluta) and his conditioned one (potentia conditionata). The latter belongs to the divine kingship, but is also limited by the goodness and love of God, as well as by the law he had given to mankind. The distinction influenced the theology of John Duns Scotus who distinguished the unconditioned potence of God (potentia absoluta) from the ordained potence (potentia ordinata). The distinction was forged in his commentary on the Sentences. This new theological notion was rejected by William of Auxerre, Thomas Aquinas, Albert the Great, Saint Bonaventure and John of La Rochelle. William Courtenay (1342-1396) and Lawrence Moonan identified its origin in the Summa Theologiae of Geoffrey of Poitiers.

Hugh of Saint-Cher also wrote the Postillae in sacram scripturam juxta quadruplicem sensum, litteralem, allegoricum, anagogicum et moralem, published frequently in the 15th and 16th centuries. His Sermones de tempore et sanctis are apparently only extracts. His exegetical works were published at Venice in 1754 in eight volumes.

Hugh directed the compilation of the first Bible concordance (of the Vulgate), completed in 1230.

== Footnotes ==
Catholic Church titles
Preceded by Rinaldo di Jenne	Cardinal-bishop of Ostia; 1261–1262	Succeeded by Henry of Segusio
