= John of La Rochelle =

French Franciscan and theologian

John of La Rochelle (also known as Jean de La Rochelle, John of Rupella, and Johannes de Rupella; c. 1200 – 8 February 1245), was a French Franciscan, scholastic philosopher, and theologian.

== Life ==
He was born in La Rochelle (Latin: Rupella), towards the end of the 12th century, and seems to have entered the Franciscan Order at an early age. He was a pupil of Alexander of Hales and was the first Franciscan to receive a bachelor's degree of theology from the University of Paris. He produced multiple treatises, sermons, commentaries on scripture, and also played a large role in the Summa fratris Alexandri, a theological Summa written by Alexander. “Hales left the beginnings of the theological Summa, and it was completed by John of la Rochelle and others”. By 1238, he was a master of theology, with his own pupils, for his name is found in the list of masters convoked in that year by William of Auvergne, Bishop of Paris, to discuss the question of ecclesiastical benefices.

“For Jean de la Rochelle, theology is essentially wisdom…Jean deems that three things are required for a theologian: knowledge, a holy life, and teaching. Someone who teaches Scripture should have a solid doctoral formation, but should also embody in himself sacred knowledge by his good will and moral actions, before practicing his profession upon others through teaching and preaching”.

In dissensions which rent the Franciscan order, John was one of the opponents of Brother Elias, and with Alexander of Hales was involved in discussions that led to the plot which brought about Elias' downfall in 1239. When the 1241 Chapter of Definitors called for comments on disputed questions on the Franciscan Rule, the Province of Paris asked John of La Rochelle, together with Alexander of Hales, Robert of Bascia and Odo of Rigaud, to furnish an explanation of the Rule of St. Francis. The work received the approbation of the General Chapter of the Order held at Bologna in 1242, and subsequently became known as the "Exposition of the Four Masters."

He died in 1245, the same year as his teacher Alexander of Hales.

== Works ==
His works, the Tractatus de divisione potentiarum animae (A Treatise on the Multiple Divisions of the Soul’s Power), written c. 1233, and Summa de anima (Summa on the Soul), written c. 1235, were arguably some of his best. Father Fidelis of Fanna says (on the Summa) that no subject is to be found so frequently in manuscripts of the 13th and 14th centuries in the many European libraries he searched.

There also exist summae on the virtue, vices, the articles of the faith, and the ten commandments; many biblical commentaries; sermons, and disputed questions on grace and other theological topics.

John was among those who declared against the general lawfulness of plurality. He appears to have enjoyed a favorable reputation, and is described by Bernard of Besse as a professor of great fame for holiness and learning, whose writings were both solid and extremely useful.

The main aim of the Summa de anima is to set out Jean's position on being and essence in the context of the debate between those who defend the theory that all of created being is composed of matter and form, and those who, like Thomas Aquinas later would, rejected the doctrine which attributed a composite nature to the soul. Jean investigates the soul according to the four Aristotelian causes: material, efficient, formal, and final. He states what he believes to be intellectual cognition, “while nonetheless retaining certain Avicennian doctrines”. Going deeper into the investigation of the soul, Jean introduces a doctrine that distinguishes the soul into two levels of reason: higher and lower. The levels of the soul are distinguished according to their objects: the objects of higher reasoning can be classified as a spiritual being, and the objects of lower reasoning are classified as corporeal. “Following Augustine, Jean classifies the objects of knowledge further by dividing them into four categories: beings above, beside, in, or beneath the soul”. He also proposes a different agent intellect for each class of objects: the immanent agent intellect suitable for corporeal beings, and two further agent intellects: one for beings outside the soul, such as angels, and one for the being above the soul, God himself. The distinction between the agent intellect outside the soul and the one above the soul, also shows Augustine's heavy influence on Jean, since similar doctrines are found in Augustine's work On Spirit and the Soul. Jean's idea here is similar to Avicenna's views on separate intelligence, in relation to a separate angelic agent intellect that acts upon the soul's immanent agent intellect.

John's Treatise on the Multiple Divisions of the Soul’s Power (Tractatus) gives another detailed view of his conception of the soul. "Fortunately it shows more clearly than his Summa how he appropriates and begins to transform his philosophical sources”. The Tractatus is divided into three parts that correspond to the three ways of looking at the soul: definition, division, and completion or perfection. “Jean’s typical procedure in each of the three parts of the Tractatus is to assemble authoritative texts on the point at hand and then to analyze their competing vocabularies”. His analysis of competing vocabularies of the soul includes a wide range of sources, including Plato, Aristotle, Seneca, the book of Genesis, Nemesius of Emesa, and Avicenna. Jean's Tractatus was a great example of how challenging it was for theologians to organize and clarify much of the newly translated material of the 13th century.

Jean made significant progress as a philosopher in a time when Parisian theologians abstained from philosophical studies. Jean had many influences and referenced many works from theologians and philosophers alike; however, much of his work, especially that in philosophy of the soul, indicates much originality.
