= Henry of Ghent =

Scholastic philosopher

- Born: c. 1217
- Died: 29 June 1293

Philosophical work
- Era: Ancient philosophy
- Region: Western philosophy
- School: Scholasticism; Neoplatonism

Henry of Ghent (c. 1217 – 29 June 1293), also known as Henricus de Gandavo and Henricus Gandavensis, was a scholastic philosopher who acquired the nickname of Doctor Solemnis (the "Solemn Doctor").

== Life ==
Henry was born in the district of Mude, near Ghent. He is supposed to have belonged to an Italian family named Bonicolli, in Dutch Goethals, but the question of his name has been much discussed (see authorities below). He studied at Ghent and then at Cologne under Albertus Magnus. After obtaining the degree of doctor he returned to Ghent, and is said to have been the first to lecture there publicly on philosophy and theology.

Attracted to Paris by the fame of the university, he took part in the many disputes between the orders and the secular priests, on the side of the latter. While Henry was a regent master at the University of Paris, the Condemnations of 1277 took place. The bishop of Paris, Stephen Tempier, promulgated a condemnation of some 219 propositions put forth by the masters of the Faculty of Theology. Henry had a hand in the creation of these propositions and because of that he was summoned to the papal legate after a fellow Augustinian, Giles of Rome. The summons was supposed to change Henry's mind concerning Thomas Aquinas and his unicity thesis (which stated that the human soul, the substantial form of the body, is the undivided principle of the individual's life, sensitivity and rationality). Following the publication of the papal bull Ad fructus uberes by Pope Martin IV in 1281, Henry supported the secular clergy against the Mendicant Orders over the question of the 'reiteration of confession' (the obligation to confess to their parish priest, at least once a year, sins already confessed to a friar). Henry was engaged in this violent controversy for the rest of his life. He died at Tournai (or Paris).

== Ideas ==
=== Being of essence ===
Henry argued that not only do individual creatures have a being corresponding to their essence - the being of essence or esse essentiae, they also have a 'somethingness' (aliquitas). The being created by God is not the being of actual existence, but the being of essence, also called esse latissimum (being in the widest sense), or esse communissimum, the most general form of being. The determination of essence respecting its being made actual is a delimitation, or specification, of that being. Thus, esse essentiae comes first, then comes esse aliquid per essentiam, being a something through essence, finally the whole essence thus made up is put into actuality.

=== Intentional distinction ===
An intentional distinction is where the very same thing is expressed by different concepts in different ways (Quodl. V, q. 12). Unlike a purely logical distinction, an intentional distinction always implies a sort of composition, although it is minor with regard to that implied by a distinction in reality.

For example, rational and animal, as they are found in man, is not a distinction of reason, since one is not a definition of the other. Nor is a real distinction, otherwise the conjunction of 'animal' and 'rational' in some particular person would be purely accidental (per accidens). Therefore, there must be some intermediate distinction, which Henry defines as 'intentional'. This principle was later developed by Scotus into the formal distinction.

=== Illumination ===
Henry's doctrines are infused by a strong Platonism. He distinguished between knowledge of actual objects and the divine inspiration by which we cognize the being and existence of God. The first throws no light upon the second. Individuals are constituted not by the material element but by their independent existence, i.e. ultimately by the fact that they are created as separate entities. Universals must be distinguished according as they have reference to our minds or to the divine mind. In the divine intelligence exist exemplars or types of the genera and species of natural objects.

On this subject Henry is far from clear; but he defends Plato against the current Aristotelian criticism, and endeavours to show that the two views are in harmony. In psychology, his view of the intimate union of soul and body is remarkable. The body he regards as forming part of the substance of the soul, which through this union is more perfect and complete.

=== Scientific knowledge ===
Henry's standards for truth exceeded what is now commonly accepted in science. Following closely Aristotle's Posterior Analytics, he demanded that "First, it must be certain, i.e. exclusive of deception and doubt; secondly, it must be of a necessary object; thirdly, it must be produced by a cause that is evident to the intellect; fourthly, it must be applied to the object by a syllogistic reasoning process". He thus excluded from the realm of the knowable anything about contingent objects. In this respect he was contradicted by his younger contemporary Duns Scotus.

== Works ==
Works by Henry of Ghent include:

- Quodlibeta Theologica (Paris, 1518; Venice, 1608 and 1613), a quodlibeta.
- Summae quaestionum ordinarium (Paris, 1520; Ferrara, 1646).
- Henrici de Gandavo Opera Omnia Leuven: Leuven University Press, 1979 sqq.
- Syncategoremata Henrico de Gandavo adscripta edited by H.A.G. Braakhuis, Girard J. Etzkorn, Gordon Wilson. With an introduction by H.A.G. Braakhuis; Leuven: Leuven University Press, 2010.

A work mistakenly attributed to Henry of Ghent is the Affligem Catalogus virorum illustrium, first published in De scriptoribus ecclesiasticis (ed. Suffridus Petri) (Cologne, 1580).

=== Translations ===
- Henry of Ghent's Summa of Ordinary Questions. Article One: On the Possibility of Knowing Translation with an introduction and notes by Roland J. Teske, S.J. South Bend, St. Augustine Press, 2008. ISBN 1-58731-359-6.
- Henry of Ghent's Summa: The Questions on Human Knowledge: (Articles 2-5). Translation, introduction and notes by Juan Carlos Flores, Louvain and Paris: Peeters, 2021. ISBN 978-90-429-4557-9.
- Henry of Ghent's "Summa": The Questions on God's Existence and Essence (Articles 21-24). Translation by Jos Decorte (†) and Roland J. Teske, S.J. Latin Text, Introduction, and Notes by Roland J. Teske, S.J. (Dallas Medieval Texts and Translations 5). Louvain/Paris: Peeters, 2005. ISBN 978-90-429-1590-9.
- Henry of Ghent's "Summa": The Questions on God's Unity and Simplicity (Articles 25-30). Latin Text, Introduction, Translation, and Notes by Roland J. Teske, S.J. (Dallas Medieval Texts and Translations 6). Louvain and Paris: Peeters, 2006. ISBN 978-90-429-1811-5.
- Juan Carlos Flores, Henry of Ghent: Metaphysics and the Trinity; with a Critical Edition of Question Six of Article Fifty-Five of the Summa Quaestionum Ordinariarum, Leuven: Leuven University Press, 2006.
- Henry of Ghent, Quodlibetal Questions on Free Will. translated by Roland J. Teske, Milwaukee: Marquette University Press, 1993. ISBN 9780585141206
- Henry of Ghent, Quodlibetal Questions on Moral Problems, translated by Roland J. Teske, Milwaukee: Marquette University Press, 2005.
