= Roland of Cremona =

Dominican theologian and early scholastic philosopher

Roland of Cremona (around 1178 – 1259) was a Dominican theologian and an early scholastic philosopher. He was the first Dominican regent master at Paris, France (1229–1230). He was among the most enthusiastic of those who made use of the newly translated Aristotle in the early 13th century.

== Composition of the soul ==
Roland of Cremona did not say as much about the soul as William of Auvergne, Bishop of Paris. He believed that the soul was the body's perfection. He affirmed the matter-form composition of the soul, unlike William. The two men agreed that there was a single soul in man and that its nature was simple. The vegetative, sensitive, and rational faculties are all performed by this single entity. The soul is dependent on the body according to Roland of Cremona. Humans differ from angels in having souls which require bodies. They have a natural inclination and dependence on the body, seeking to be joined to it. When the soul leaves the body it is not longer a soul, but becomes a spirit. This is because it no longer has the relationship to the body by which it is deemed a soul.

Like Peter of Spain, he denied that embryos possess pre-rational souls. Roland of Cremona attributed the growth and development of the soul to the soul of the mother.

== Career ==
He joined the Dominican order at Bologna in 1219. He was a lecturer at the medieval University of Toulouse from its foundation in 1229, and preached against the Cathars in the city. In 1231 he led a party of friars and priests to exhume from a cemetery the body of a man rumoured to have died a heretic. This precipitate action led to protests from the consuls of Toulouse, and Roland left the city soon afterwards.
