= Ralph of Longchamp =

Ralph of Longchamp (c. 1155 – c. 1215) was a scholastic philosopher of the 13th century, known also as a physician and natural philosopher. He taught at Oxford and possibly at Paris.

He was a pupil of Alain of Lille and wrote a commentary on Alain's poem Anticlaudianus, in about 1212.
