= Praepositinus =

Praepositinus (Gilbert Prevostin of Cremona, Prevostinus Cremonensis) (c. 1135 – 1210) was an Italian scholastic philosopher and theologian. He was a liturgical commentator, and supported a res-theory of belief. He discussed intentional contexts.

== Biography ==
Praepositinus was probably born in northern Italy. Having studied under Petrus Comestor and taught at Paris, he was scholasticus of Mainz Cathedral in 1196. Returning, he was Chancellor of the University of Paris from c. 1206 to 1209. In 1209 he was replaced as chancellor by John of Chandelle; he retired to an abbey and died shortly after, in 1210.

To him have been attributed, wrongly, a Summa de poenitentia iniungenda (unedited), Quaestiones (unedited) and a Summa contra haereticos (published by J. N. Garvin and J. A. Corbett at Notre Dame (IN), 1958). The following are authentic: a Summa theologica of which books I and IV have been published; Collecta ex distinctionibus, a work known by a manuscript in Munich, which expounds Scripture in alphabetical order of the words considered (114); a Summa super Psalterium (several manuscripts); a Tractatus de officiis which uses Jean Beleth’s Summa de ecclesiasticis officiis written between 1160 and 1164, but does not know Sicard of Cremona’s Mitrale (early 13th c.). This Tractatus inspired the Rationale of Guillaume Durand of Mende (it has been edited by J. A. Corbett, Notre Dame, 1969). More than 60 sermons are allowed to Praepositinus, only one of which has been published (J. Longère, Mélanges Dom Bascour, Louvain, 1980, p. 207-211; preached to clerics at Munich and Paris).
