= Ibn Kammuna =

Philosopher and dissenter of Islam

- ابن كمونة، عز الدولة سعد بن منصور البغدادي
- Born: 1215; Baghdad
- Died: 1284 (aged 68–69); Hillah

Sa'd ibn Mansur (Izz Al-dawla) Ibn Kammuna (Arabic: إبن كمونة سعد إبن منصور, 1215—1284, was a 13th-century Jewish physician and philosopher. His main works include a comparative treatise of the three Abrahamic religions, which includes a well informed critical evaluation of Islam, as well as a commentaries on Ibn Sina and as-Suhrawardi.

== Works ==
Ibn Kammuna's commentary on Shahab al-Din Suhrawardi's Talwihat, the core text of Illuminationist philosophy is deemed as one of the most thorough examination of that branch of thought.

His comparative treatise on the three monotheistic religions Christianity, Judaism and Islam, titled Examination of the Three Faiths challenged the legitimacy of Islam where he reasoned that incompatibility of sharia with the principles of justice undercuts Muhammad's claims of being a perfect man and stated that people convert to Islam from ulterior motives.

"That is why, to this day we never see anyone converting to Islam unless in terror, or in quest of power, or to avoid heavy taxation, or to escape humiliation, or if taken prisoner, or because of infatuation with a Muslim woman, or for some similar reason. Nor do we see a respected, wealthy, and pious non-Muslim well versed in both his faith and that of Islam, going over to the Islamic faith without some of the aforementioned or similar motives."

He goes on to regard Muhammad as unoriginal and imperfect.

"We will not concede that Muhammad added to the knowledge of God and of obedience to him anything more than what was found in the earlier religions."

"There is no proof that Muhammad attained perfection and the ability to perfect others as claimed."

The publication of the book caused rioting in Baghdad, forcing Ibn Kammuna to flee that city in secret and was recorded by the thirteenth century historian Ibn al-Fuwati.

In this year 1284, it became known in Baghdad that the Jew Ibn Kammuna had written a volume in which he displayed impudence in the discussion of the prophecies. God keep us from repeating what he said. The infuriated mob rioted, and massed to attack his house and to kill him. The amir...and a group of high officials rode forth to the Mustansiriya madrassa, and summoned the supreme judge and the law teachers to hold a hearing on the affair. They sought Ibn Kammuna but he was in hiding. That day happened to be a Friday. The supreme judge set out for the prayer service but as the mob blocked him, he returned to the Mustansirya. The amir stepped out to calm the crowds but these showered abuse upon him and accused him of being on the side of Ibn Kammuna, and of defending him. Then, upon the amir's order, it was heralded in Baghdad that, early the following morning outside the city wall, lbn Kammuna would be burned. The mob subsided, and no further reference to Ibn Kammuna was made. As for lbn Kammuna, he was put into a leather-covered box and carried to Hilla where his son was then serving as official. There he stayed for a time until he died.

Some scholars believe that Ibn Kammuna converted to Islam, claiming a possible conversion to Twelver Shiism in the last months of his life, as suggested by the author of Matalib.

== Bibliography ==
- The Arabic Treatise on the Immortality of the Soul by Sa'd ibn Mansur ibn Kammuna
- An Overview of Investigations into the Views of the Three Faiths
- Commentary on Ibn Sina's al-Isharat wa 'l-tanbihat.
- Ibn Kammunah's Treatise on the Differences between the Rabbanites and the Karaites
- Pourjavady, Reza. A Jewish Philosopher of Baghdad: Izz Al-dawla Ibn Kammuna (D. 683/1284) and His Writings (Brill Academic Publishers, 2006)
- Article on Ibn Kammuna at the Stanford Encyclopedia of Philosophy
