= William of Auxerre =

French scholastic theologian and church official

William of Auxerre (1140/50–1231) was a French scholastic theologian and official in the Roman Catholic Church.

The teacher by whom William was most influenced was Praepositinus, or Prevostin, of Cremona, Chancellor of the University of Paris from 1206 to 1209. The names of teacher and pupil are mentioned in the same sentence by Thomas Aquinas.

He was an Archdeacon of Beauvais before becoming a professor of theology at the university in Paris. In 1231, he was made a member of the commission appointed by Gregory IX to examine Aristotle's writings on the natural sciences and to offer amendments where religiously necessary. Consequently, William was one of the first theologians to be influenced by Aristotle. His Summa Aurea shows a debt still to Peter Lombard, and it advances the ontological argument, but it also shows novelty and an intellectual awareness and insistence on the physical that had not been seen earlier. Summa Aurea influenced John of Treviso.
