= Ulrich of Strasbourg =

German Dominican theologian and scholastic philosopher

Ulrich of Strasbourg (c. 1225–1277) was a German Dominican theologian and scholastic philosopher from Strasbourg, Alsace. A disciple of Albertus Magnus, he is known for his De summo bono, written 1265 to 1272.

== Works ==
- Ulricus de Argentina, De summo bono, I–IV, edited by A. Beccarisi et al., Corpus philosophorum teutonicorum medii aevi I, vols 1–4, Hamburgh, Meiner, 1987-2008.
