= Regent master =

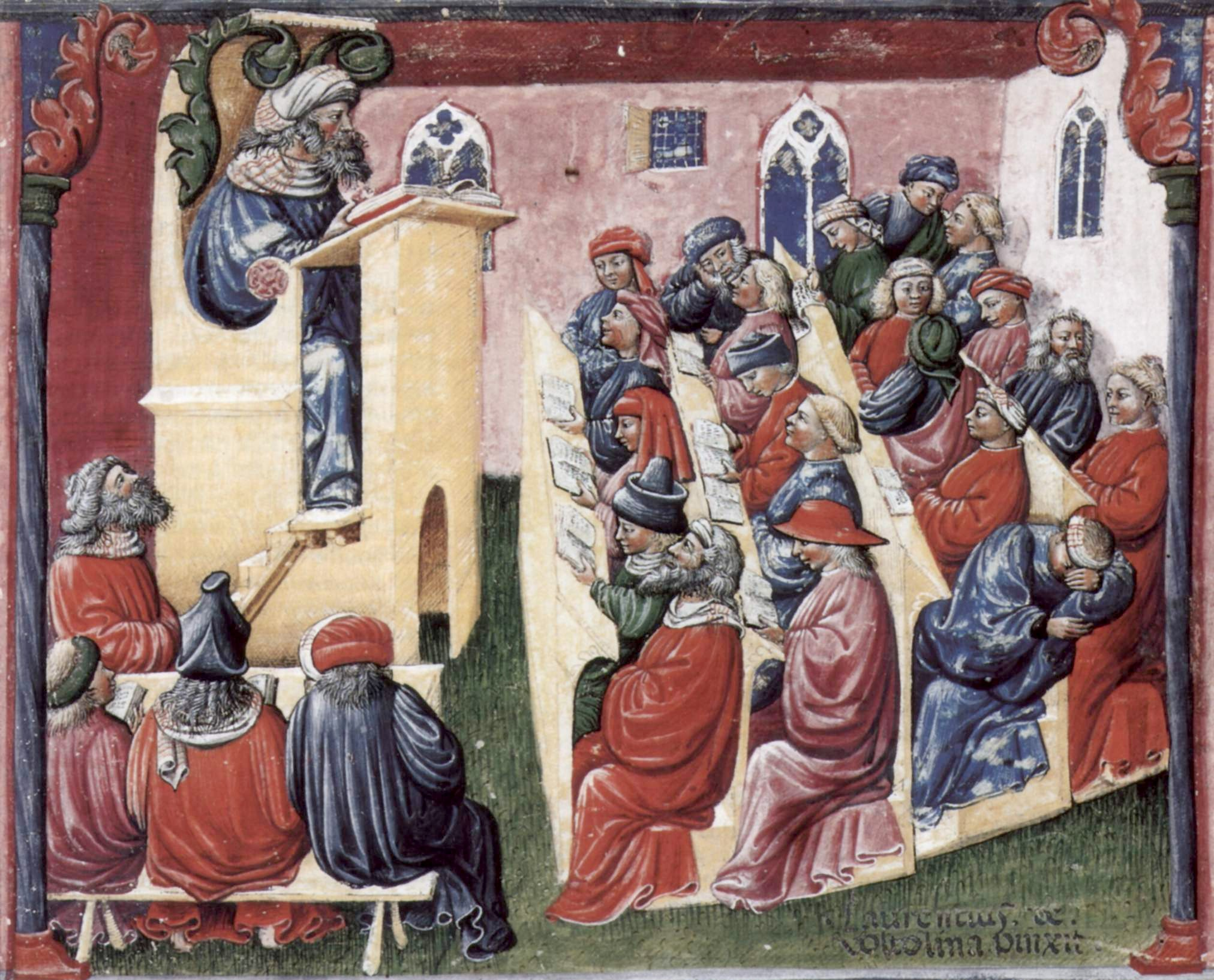
Illustration of Henricus de Alemannia lecturing at Bologna, 14th century.

Regent master (Latin: magister regēns, lit. 'ruling teacher') was a title conferred in the medieval universities upon a student who had acquired a master's degree. The degree meant simply the right to teach, the Licentia docendi, a right which could be granted, in the University of Paris, only by the Chancellor of the Cathedral of Notre Dame, or the Chancellor of St. Geneviève. According to the Third Council of Lateran, held in 1179, this Licentia docendi had to be granted gratuitously, and to all duly qualified applicants.

If the new member stayed in the university and continued to take an active part in its teaching, he was called a magister regens, a practising teacher. If he were to look for another career, however, he would become non regens: a passive member of the corporation of masters, without losing his affiliation to it, which usually lasted for life. An example of a regent master was William Vorilong, a 15th-century French philosopher, logician, and theologian.
