= Alexander of Hales =

English theologian and philosopher (c.1185–1245)

Alexander of Hales OFM
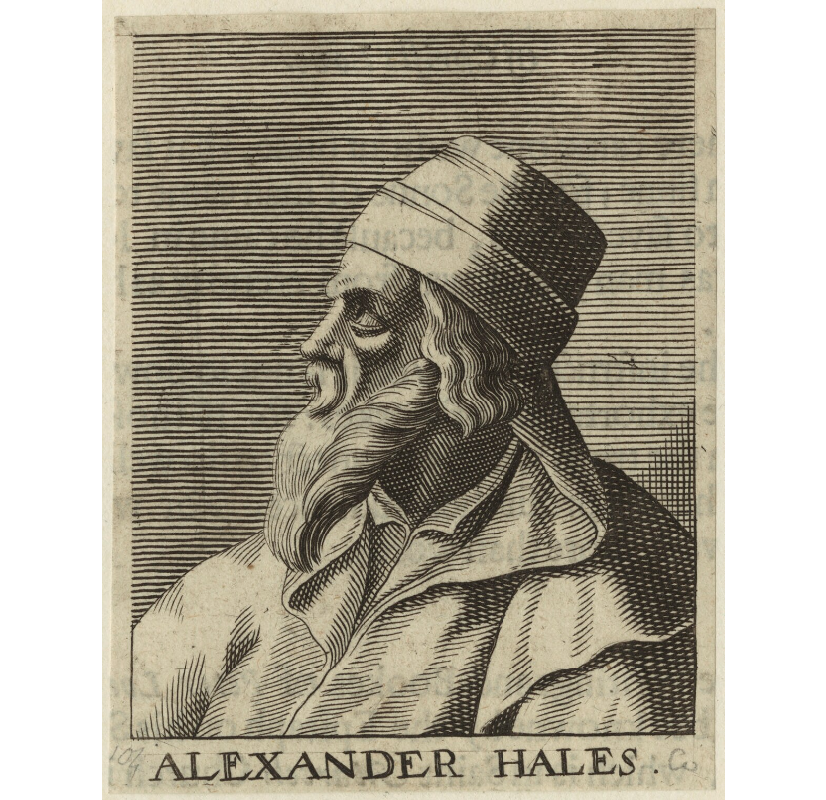
- Doctor Alexander of (H)ales by George Glover. Line engraving, mid 17th century.
- Born: c. 1185; Hales, Shropshire, England
- Died: 21 August 1245; Paris, France (aged 59-60)

Education
- Education: University of Paris

Philosophical work
- Era: Medieval philosophy
- Region: Western philosophy
- School: Scholasticism
- Main interests: Metaphysics, theology

Alexander of Hales (also Halensis, Alensis, Halesius, Alesius /əˈliːsiəs/; c. 1185 – 21 August 1245)—known also as Doctor Irrefragibilis, or "Irrefutable Teacher" (so-called by Pope Alexander IV in the bull De Fontibus Paradisi), and as Theologorum Monarcha (or "King of Theologians")—was a Franciscan friar, theologian, and philosopher instrumental to the development of scholasticism.

== Life ==
Alexander was born at Hales, Shropshire (today Halesowen, West Midlands), England, between 1180 and 1186. He came from a rather wealthy country family, studied at the University of Paris, and became a master of arts sometime before 1210. He began to read theology in 1212 or 1213, and became a regent master in 1220 or 1221. He introduced the Sentences of Peter Lombard as the basic textbook for the study of theology. During the University strike of 1229, Alexander participated in an embassy to Rome to discuss the place of Aristotle in the curriculum. Having held a prebend at Holborn (prior to 1229) and a canonry of St. Paul's in London (1226–1229), he visited England in 1230 and received a canonry and an archdeaconry in Coventry and Lichfield, his native diocese. He taught at Paris in the academic year 1232–33, but was appointed to a delegation by Henry III of England in 1235, along with Simon Langton and Fulk Basset, to negotiate the renewal of the peace between England and France.

In 1236 or 1237, aged about 50, Alexander entered the Franciscan Order after considering both the Cistercians and the Dominicans. He thus became the first Franciscan friar to hold a university chair. His doctrinal positions became the starting point of the Franciscan school of theology. He continued to teach and to represent the university, and participated in the First Council of Lyon in the winter of 1245.

After returning to Paris, Alexander fell ill, possibly due to an epidemic then sweeping the city. He passed his chair on to John of La Rochelle, setting the precedent for that chair to be held by a Franciscan, and soon after died in Paris on 21 August 1245.

As the first Franciscan to hold a chair at the University of Paris, Alexander had many significant disciples. He was called Doctor Irrefragibilis (Irrefutable Teacher) and Doctor Doctorum (Teacher of Teachers). The latter title is especially suggestive of his role in educating several Franciscans who later became influential thinkers in the faculty, among them Bonaventure, John of La Rochelle, Odo Rigaldus, William of Middleton, and Richard Rufus of Cornwall. Bonaventure, who may not have studied under Alexander directly, nevertheless referred to him as his "father and master" and wished to "follow in his footsteps."

== Works ==
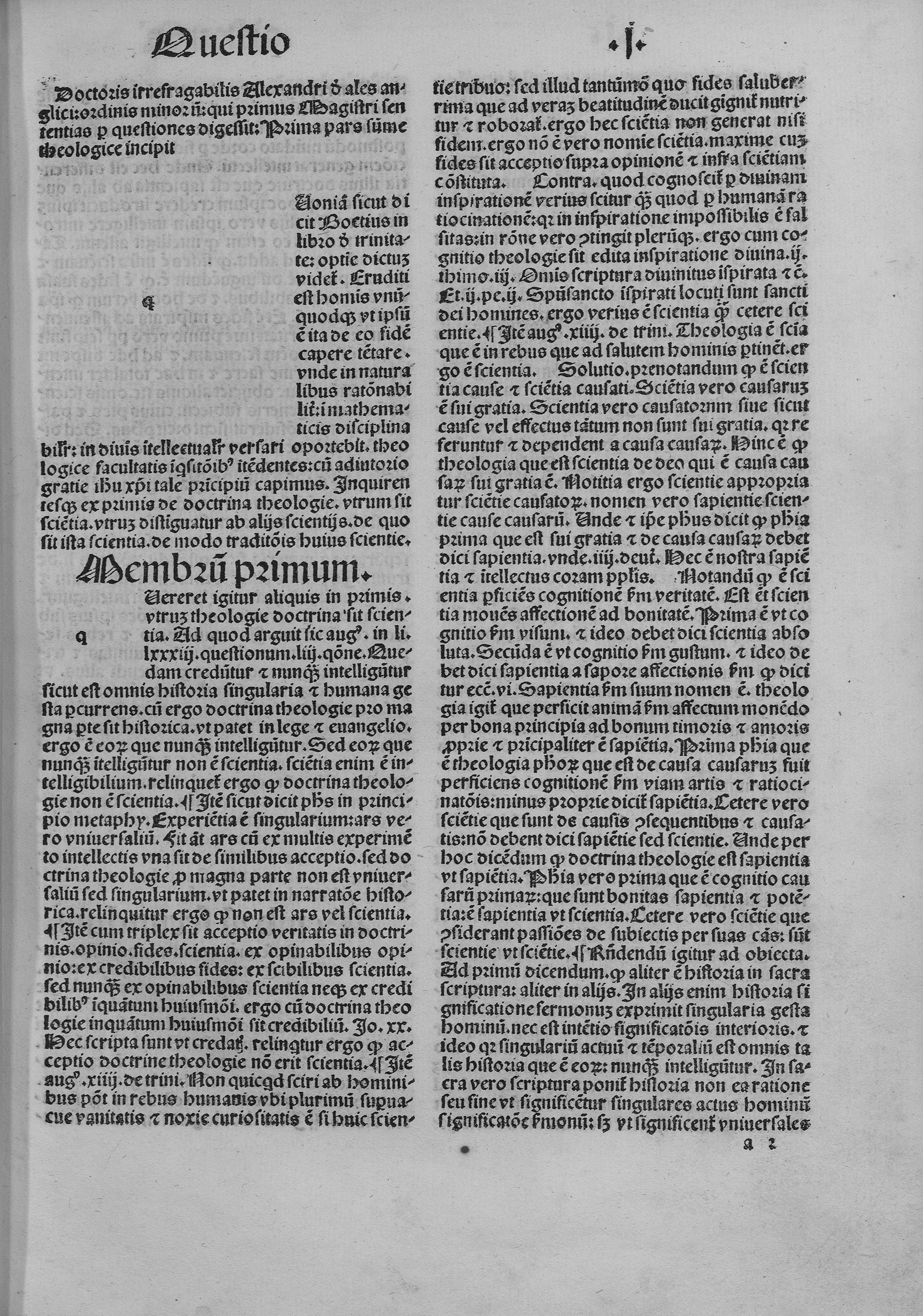
Summa universae theologiae

Alexander is known for reflecting the works of several other Middle Age thinkers, especially those of Anselm of Canterbury and Augustine of Hippo. He was also known to quote thinkers such as Bernard of Clairvaux and Richard of Saint-Victor. He differs from those in his genre as he is known to reflect his own interests and those of his generation. When using the works of his authorities, Alexander does not only review their reasoning but also gives conclusions, expands on them, and offers his agreements and disagreement with them. He also differed in that he appealed to pre-Lombardian figures, and by referencing Anselm of Canterbury and Bernard of Clairvaux, whose works were not cited as frequently by other 12th-century scholastics. Aristotle is also quite frequently quoted in Alexander's works. Alexander was fascinated by the Pseudo-Dionysian hierarchy of angels and in how their nature can be understood, given Aristotelian metaphysics.

Among the doctrines which were specially developed and, so to speak, fixed by Alexander of Hales, are the thesaurus supererogationis perfectorum (treasury of supererogatory merits) and the character indelibilis (sacramental character) of baptism, confirmation, and ordination. That doctrine had been written about much earlier by Augustine and was eventually defined a dogma by the Council of Trent. He also posed an important question about the cause of the Incarnation: would Christ have been incarnated if humanity had never sinned? The question eventually became the focal point for a philosophical issue (the theory of possible worlds) and a theological topic on the distinction between God's absolute power (potentia absoluta) and His ordained power (potentia ordinata).

=== Summa Universae Theologiae ===
Alexander wrote a summary and commentary of Peter Lombard's four books of the Sentences. It had exposed the trinitarian theology of the Greeks. This had been the most important writing that Alexander had claimed, and it had been the earliest in the genre. While it is common for scholars to state that Alexander was the first to write a commentary on the Sentences of Peter Lombard, it is not quite accurate. Authorship is more contentious for this work; although he started this work, he died before it could be finished, and it most likely was more a product of people other than Alexander. There were a number of "commentaries" on the Sentences, but Alexander's appears to have been the first magisterial commentary. Although it was Alexander's most significant writing, it had not been completed, therefore leaving historians with many questions on the reliability and quality of the writing. This was taken into consideration when the Summa had been examined by Victorin Doucet for different editions of them. The sources has seem to be the resulting problem of the Summa, "counted there were 4814 explicit quotations and 1372 implicit quotations from Augustine, more than one quarter of texts were cited in the body of the Summa.

Of Alexander's Summa, which was on one occasion proclaimed by an assembly of seventy doctors to be infallible, Roger Bacon declared that, though it was as heavy as the weight of a horse, it was full of errors and displayed ignorance of physics, of metaphysics, and even of logic.

=== Other historical works ===
Alexander also influenced and sometimes is confused with Alexander Carpenter, Latinized as Fabricius (fl. 1429), who was the author of the Destructorium viciorum, a religious work popular in the 15th and 16th centuries. Carpenter also authored other works, such as Homiliae eruditae ("Learned Sermons").

== Historiographical contribution ==
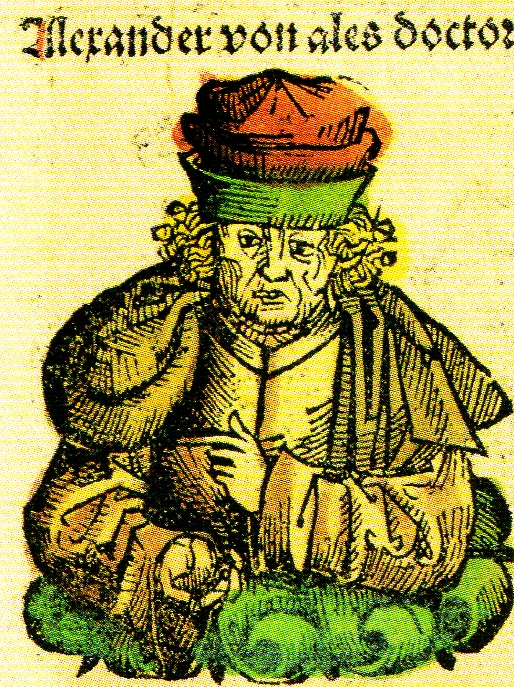
Doctor Alexander of (H)ales (1493)

Alexander was said to have been among the earliest scholastics to engage with Aristotle's newly translated writings. Between 1220 and 1227, he wrote Glossa in quatuor libros Sententiarum Petri Lombardi (A Gloss on the Four Books of the Sentences of Peter Lombard) (composed in the mid-12th century), which was particularly important because it was the first time that a book other than the Bible was used as a basic text for theological study. This steered the development of scholasticism in a more systematic direction, inaugurating an important tradition of writing commentaries on the Sentences as a fundamental step in the training of master theologians.

=== A medieval scholastic ===
In doing so, he elevated Lombard's work from a mere theological resource to the basic framework of questions and problems from which masters could teach. The commentary (or more correctly titled a Gloss) survived in student reports from Alexander's teaching in the classroom and so it provides a major insight into the way theologians taught their discipline in the 1220s. As is the case with Glossa and Quaestiones Disputatae, much of his work is probably written in the form of notes on his oral teachings by students, though the content is definitely his.

For his contemporaries, however, Alexander's fame was his inexhaustible interest in disputation. His disputations prior to his becoming a Franciscan cover over 1,600 pages in their modern edition. His disputed questions after 1236 remain unpublished. Alexander was also one of the first scholastics to participate in the Quodlibeta, a university event in which a master had to respond to any question posed by any student or master over a period of three days. Alexander's Quodlibetal Questions also remain unedited.

=== Theologian ===
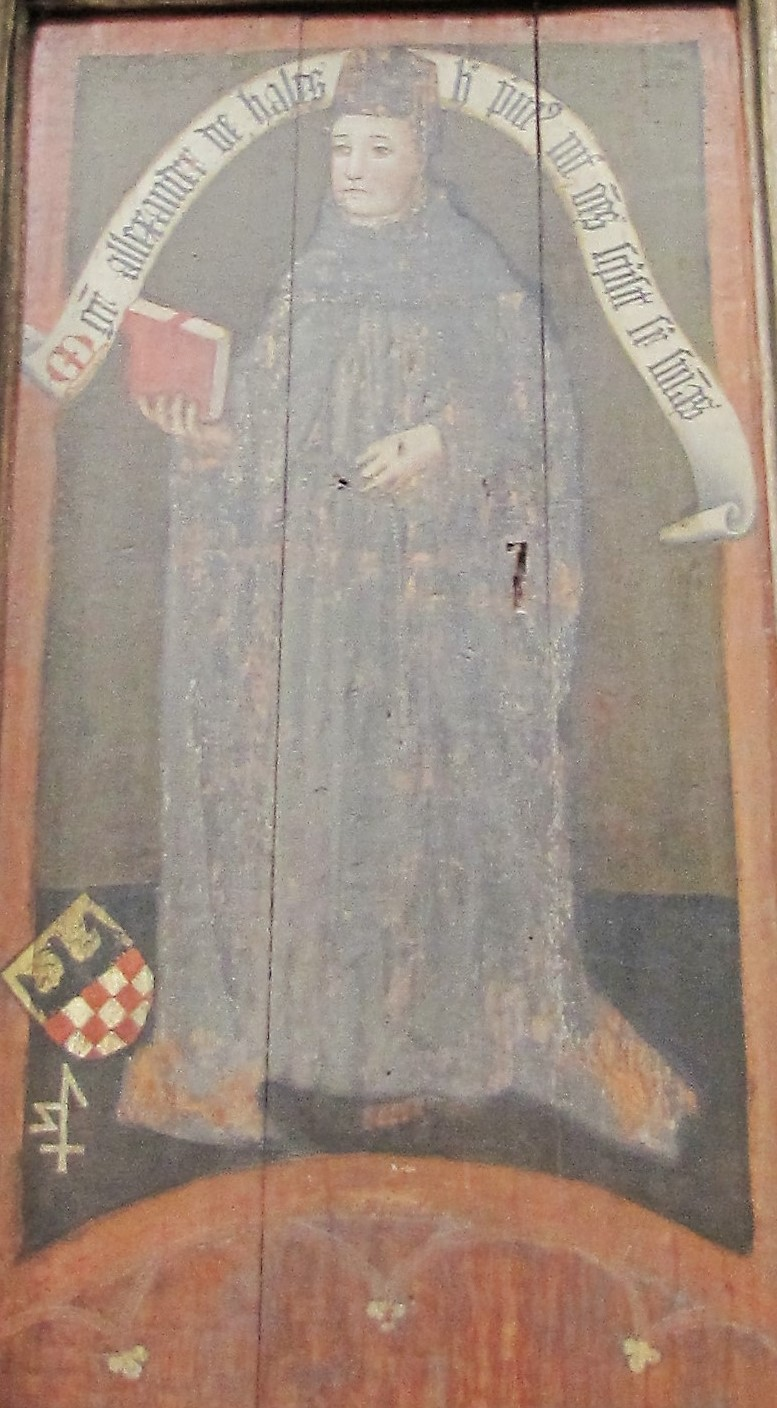
Portrait on wood, St. Catherine's Church, Lübeck, Germany

At the beginning of 1236, he entered the Franciscan order (he was at least 50) and was the first Franciscan to hold a chair at the University of Paris. He held this post until shortly before his death in Paris in 1245. When he became a Franciscan and thus created a formal Franciscan school of theology at Paris, it was soon clear that his students lacked some of the basic tools for the discipline. Alexander responded by beginning a Summa theologiae that is now known as the Summa fratris Alexandri. Alexander drew mainly from his own disputations, but also selected ideas, arguments and sources from his contemporaries. It treats in its first part the doctrines of God and his attributes; in its second, those of creation and sin; in its third, those of redemption and atonement; and, in its fourth and last, those of the sacraments. This massive text, which Roger Bacon would later sarcastically describe as weighing as much as a horse, was unfinished at his death; his students, William of Middleton and John of Rupella, were charged with its completion. It was certainly read by the Franciscans at Paris, including Bonaventure.

Alexander was an innovative theologian. He was part of the generation that first grappled with the writings of Aristotle. While there was a ban on using Aristotle's works as teaching texts, theologians like Alexander continued to exploit his ideas in their theology. Two other uncommon sources were promoted by Alexander: Anselm of Canterbury, whose writings had been ignored for almost a century, gained an important advocate in Alexander and he used Anselm's works extensively in his teaching on Christology and soteriology; and, Pseudo-Dionysius the Areopagite, whom Alexander used in his examination of the theology of Orders and ecclesiastical structures.

Though he also continued the tradition of Aristotle- and Augustine-focused thought in the Franciscan school, he did so through an Anselm-directed lens. In fact, Alexander was one of the major influences for the advancement of Anselmian thought in the 13th century. One such example is the idea of original sin as a lack of justice. Alexander believed that original sin is both a punishment as well as a cause for punishment. That is to say, the body is corrupt, but the soul is clean. Alexander advances the idea that it would not be God's fault to create a being that would bind the ‘corrupt’ with the ‘clean’. He advanced a highly original response that the soul naturally desires the body. Consequently, God is both merciful in giving the soul what it wants, as well as just in punishing the soul for binding with the corrupt flesh. Either the soul knew that the body was corrupt, or it did not (in which case it would be “laboring under ignorance”); both of these considerations are cause for divine punishment.

Alexander is also known for rejecting the idea that there are many things in God's mind, instead claiming that it is more perfect to know just one thing. He did not start off with this view, though. In the Glossa, he openly suggests the idea of the multiplicity of divine ideas. In his later work, Quaestio disputata antequam erat Frater 46, he finally rejects the plurality of divine ideas, and this theme continues through the rest of his works. Specifically, in one of his last works, De scientia divina, he concludes that the idea of plurality itself is strictly temporal, a human notion.

One of his more famous works, the Summa, is important because of its system for determining if a war is just. There are six requirements for determining this: authority and attitude (in reference to who declares the war), intention and condition (in reference to the soldiers), merit (of the enemy) and just cause. Just cause becomes the overarching moral principle for declaring war in three ways: the relief of good people, coercion of the wicked, and peace for all. Alexander put ‘peace for all’ at the end of the list to amplify its importance.

== Writings ==
- Alexander of Hales. Glossa in quatuor libros sententiarum Petri Lombardi. Edited by the Quaracchi Fathers. Bibliotheca Franciscana scholastica medii aevi, t. 12–15. Rome: Collegii S. Bonaventurae, 1951–1957.
- Alexander of Hales. Quaestiones disputatae antequam esset frater. Edited by the Quaracchi Fathers. Bibliotheca Franciscana scholastica medii aevi, t. 19–21. Quaracchi: Collegii S. Bonaventurae,1960.
- Alexander of Hales (attributed). Summa universis theologiae, (Summa fratris Alexandri), edited by Bernardini Klumper and the Quaracchi Fathers, 4 vols. Rome: Collegii S. Bonaventurae, 1924–1948.
