= William of Auvergne =

French bishop and philosopher

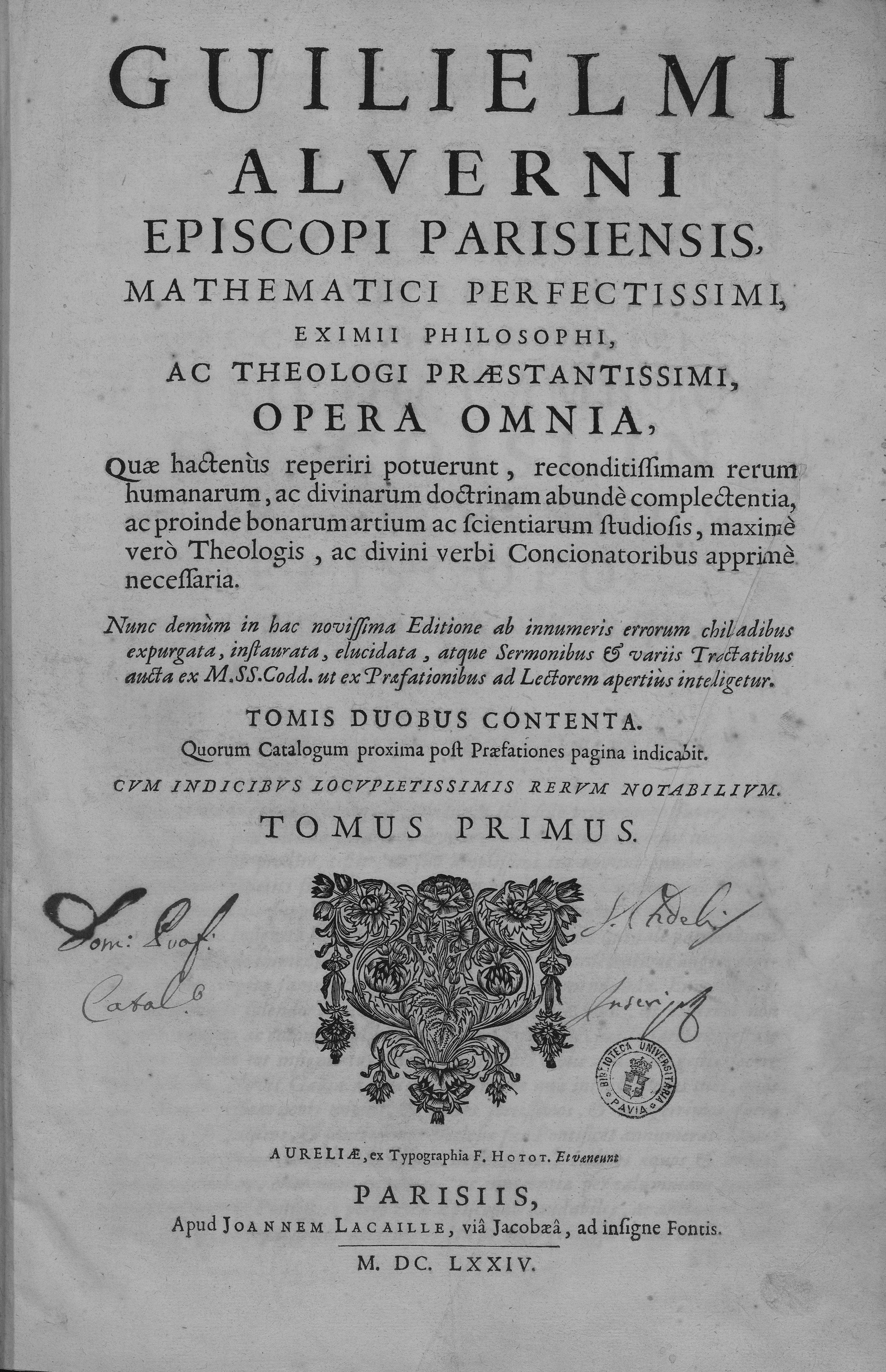
Opera omnia, 1674

William of Auvergne (Latin: Guilielmus Alvernus; French: Guillaume d'Auvergne; 1180/90–1249), also known as William of Paris, was a French theologian and philosopher who served as Bishop of Paris from 1228 until his death. He was one of the first western high medieval European philosophers to engage with and comment extensively upon Aristotelian and Islamic philosophy.

== Early life ==
Very little is known of William's early life. He was born in Aurillac and the likely date range for his birth is reckoned from the fact that a professor of Theology normally needed to be at least 35 years old. If that holds good, then William could have been born as early as 1180 or as late as 1190.

He went to Paris to study and earned a master's degree in Theology at the University of Paris. A Scholastic philosopher, he was made a professor first in the faculty of arts and then in 1220 in that of theology. His theology was systematically Aristotelian, although not uncritically so, and he was the first theologian to attempt to reconcile Aristotle with Christian doctrine, and especially with the teachings of Augustine of Hippo.

The Aristotelian texts which were then available in Western Europe were few in number and mostly Arab translations. William sought to rescue Aristotle from the Arabians and worked to refute certain doctrines, such as the eternality of the world and the heresy of Catharism. His major work is the Magisterium Divinale, which has been translated as "Teaching on God in the Mode of Wisdom".

== Career ==
By 1223, William was a canon at the Notre Dame cathedral. Upon the death of the bishop of Paris, Bartholomaeus (20 October 1227), the canons elected Nicolas as the next bishop. William was dissatisfied with this outcome and went to Rome to ask the Pope to intervene. Whilst in Rome he made such a strong impression on Pope Gregory IX that the pope chose William in 1228 to be the next bishop of Paris.

As bishop of Paris, William was a strong supporter of the university although his episcopacy was not without controversy in the eyes of the university. Following a heavy-handed use of royal force, which led to several students being killed in Paris, university staff turned to William expecting him to defend them. His failure to do so led to a university strike with many prominent masters and students leaving to go to other cities where they then founded new schools and universities. With the academic staff on strike William decided to appoint Roland of Cremona OP to a master's chair in theology, thus beginning a long and distinguished tradition in which Dominican and Franciscan masters taught at the university.

Whilst William was a strong advocate for the use of reason and academic study in theology, he also maintained that academic theology was at the service of the church and must conform to doctrinal requirements. As a result of this in January 1241 he published a list of 10 theological propositions which he condemned and ordered should not be taught at the university.

During his episcopate he also took action against prostitution in the city. In 1248, he served on the Regency council during Louis IX's absence on the Seventh Crusade.

== Works ==
- Teaching on God in the mode of Wisdom (Magisterium Divinale et Sapientiale) (consisting of the following seven works)
  - Why God became Man (Cur Deus Homo)
  - On the Soul (de anima)
  - On Faith and Laws (de fide et legibus)
  - On the Virtues (de virtutibus)
  - On the Sacraments (de sacramentis)
  - On the Trinity (de trinitate)
  - On the World (de universo)
- The Faces of the World (de faciebus mundi)
- The Art of Preaching (de arte praedicandi)
- On Good and Evil (de bono et malo)
- On the cloister of the Soul (de claustro animae)
- On Granting Benefices (de collatione et singularitate beneficiorum)
- On Grace and Free judgement (de gratia et libero arbitrio)
- On the praises of patience (de laudibus patientiae)
- On the Mass (de missa)
- On the passion of the Lord (de passione Domini)
- A New Tract on Penance (de paenitentia novus tractatus)
- Commentary on Ecclesiastes (In Ecclesiasten)
- Commentary on Proverbs (In Proverbia)
- Divine Rhetoric (Rhetorica divina)

== Translations ==
- Selected spiritual writings: Why God became man; On grace; On faith, translated by Roland J Teske, Medieval Sources in Translation 50, (Toronto: Pontifical Institute of Mediaeval Studies, 2011)
- The providence of God regarding the universe: part three of the first principal part of The universe of creatures, translated by Roland J. Teske, (Milwaukee: Marquette University Press, 2007)
- The soul, translated by Roland J Teske, Medieval philosophical texts in translation, (Milwaukee: Marquette University Press, 2000)
- On the virtues: part one of On the virtues and vices, translated by Roland J Teske, (Milwaukee: Marquette University Press, 2009)
- The universe of creatures, selections translated by Roland J. Teske, (Milwaukee: Marquette University Press, 1998)
- The immortality of the soul = De immortalitate animae, translated by Roland J. Teske, (Milwaukee: Marquette University Press, 1991)
- The Trinity, or, The first principle = De Trinitate, seu De primo principio, translated by Roland J. Teske and Francis C. Wade, (Milwaukee: Marquette University Press, 1989)
- Rhetorica divina, seu ars oratoria eloquentiae divinae, Latin text and translation by Roland J. Teske, ( Dallas Medieval Texts and Translations 17, Leuven, Peeters, 2013)
