= Book of the 24 Philosophers =

Philosophical and theological medieval text of uncertain authorship

Page from the Book of the 24 Philosophers in a 14th-century manuscript now in Paris. The name at the top of the page attributes the text to Hermes Trismegistus.

The Book of the 24 Philosophers (Latin: Liber XXIV philosophorum) is a philosophical and theological medieval text of uncertain authorship.

== Overview ==
The book consists of twenty-four "sentences", "aphorisms" or "definitions" of God, attributed to as many philosophers attending a fictional gathering, each an attempt to answer their only remaining question, "what is God?" (quid Deus?). The first textual witness is from a 12th-century French manuscript currently at Laon. The definitions were often accompanied by a scholastic commentary in either of two redactions, the "shorter" and the "longer" commentary. Both definitions and commentary echo and weave numerous late ancient and medieval views on the first cause and the nature of divinity.

During the Middle Ages, the Liber was variously attributed to Hermes Trismegistus, Aristotle or simply quoted anonymously by theologians and philosophers. Contemporary scholarship is still inconclusive about the origin and authorship of the text. French scholar Françoise Hudry has argued for the attribution to Marius Victorinus (fl. 4th century). According to others, the text would belong to a lost work by Aristotle, the De philosophia, known to medieval Europe through the Arab translators of the Toledo School.

There are notably German, French and Italian studies of the text available, with no English translation yet in print, although online editions exist.

== Influence ==
The influence of this work on medieval scholarship and literature has revealed traces of its ideas among the works of Jean de Meung, Dante, Meister Eckhart, Nicholas of Cusa, Giordano Bruno, Martin Luther, Robert Fludd, Pascal, and Leibniz.

The second definition in particular gained wide currency from early on in the High Middle Ages: “God is an infinite sphere whose centre is everywhere and whose circumference is nowhere” (Deus est sphaera infinita cuius centrum est ubique, circumferentia nusquam).

== Bibliography ==
- Baeumker, Clemens, "Das pseudo-hermetische 'Buch der vierundzwanzig Meister' (Liber XXIV philosophorum)", in Clemens Baeumker (ed.), Abhandlungen aus dem Gebiete der Philosophie und ihrer Geschichte. Eine Festgabe zum 70. Geburtstag des Freiherrn Georg von Hertling, Freiburg am Breisgau, 1913, pp. 17–40.
- Baeumker, Clemens, "Das pseudo-hermetische 'Buch der vierundzwanzig Meister' (Liber XXIV philosophorum)", in Clemens Baeumker, Studien und Charakteristiken zur Geschichte der Philosophie, insbesondere des Mittelalters. Gesammelte Vorträge und Aufsätze von C. Baeumker, von Martin Grabmann editor, Münster, 1927, pp. 194–214 (revised and corrected edition).
- D'Alverny, Marie-Therèse, “Un témoin muet des luttes doctrinales du XIIIe siècle”, Archives d'Histoire Doctrinale Et Littéraire du Moyen Âge 17 (1949).
- Flasch, Kurt, Was ist Gott? Das Buch der 24 Philosophen, Verlag C.H. Beck, München, 2011.
- Follon, Jacques, “Le livre des XXIV philosophes. Traduit du latin, édité et annoté par Françoise Hudry. Postface de Marc Richir”, Revue Philosophique de Louvain, Persée, vol. 87, no. 74, 1989, pp. 359–363.
- Hudry, Françoise (ed.), Le Livre des XXIV Philosophes (Latin text and French translation), Millon, Grenoble, 1989.
- Hudry, Françoise (ed.), Liber Viginti Quattuor Philosophorum, cura et studio F. Hudry, (Hermes latinus III, 1; Corpus Christianorum, Continuatio Mediaevalis 143A), Turnhout, 1997.
- Hudry, Françoise (ed.), Marius Victorinus, Le livre des vingt-quatre philosophes: résurgence d'un texte du IVe siècle, collection “Histoire des doctrines de l'Antiquité classique” n° 39, Paris, Librairie Philosophique J. Vrin, 2009.
- Lucentini, Paolo (ed.), Liber viginti quattuor philosophorum, Adelphi, Milano, 1999.
- Lucentini, Paolo, “Il Liber viginti quattvor philosophorum nei poemi medievali”, in Marenbon, John (ed.), Poetry and Philosophy in the Middle Ages: A Festschrift for Peter Dronke, Brill, 2001.
