= Ptolemy of Lucca =

Italian Catholic priest and historian

Most Reverend Ptolemy of Lucca
- Bishop of Torcello
- Church: Catholic Church
- Diocese: Diocese of Torcello
- In office: 1318–1327
- Predecessor: Giuliano II
- Successor: Bartolomeo de’ Pasquali

Orders
- Consecration: 15 March 1318 by Pope John XXII

Personal details
- Born: Tolomeo Fiadoni c. 1236 Lucca, Republic of Lucca
- Died: c. 1327 Torcello, Republic of Venice
- Occupation: Bishop; Historian; Political theorist

Tolomeo Fiadoni (better known as Ptolemy of Lucca, sometimes Bartholomew of Lucca; c. 1236 – c. 1327) was an Italian Catholic priest, historian and political theorist.

== Biography ==
Ptolemy was born in Lucca in the 1230s. The year 1236 is given in late sources, but may well stem from an accurate tradition. His Italian given name was Tolomeo, variously spelled "Tolomeus", "Tholomeus", "Thollomeus", "Ptolomeus" and "Ptholomeus" in the Latin documents of the time. One document gives his name as Bartolomeus de Luca and several modern scholars have called him Bartholomew, but this is probably a hypercorrection of his unusual name. His family name was Fiadoni. They were a non-noble but wealthy merchant family. Ptolemy's relationship to other recorded Fiadonis is uncertain. He was probably the son of Rayno and brother of Homodeo. He had a niece named Tolomea.

At an early age Ptolemy entered the Dominican Order. He was distinguished for piety, and his intense application to study, for which reasons he won the respect and warm friendship of Thomas Aquinas. He was not only his disciple, but also his confidant and confessor. In 1272 he accompanied Aquinas from Rome to Naples where he still was in 1274, when the news of his master's death at Fossa Nuova reached him. He was elected prior of the convent of his native city in 1288. At Naples (1294), he took an active part in the public demonstration which was made to prevent Pope Celestine V from resigning.

In 1301 he was elected Prior of Santa Maria Novella at Florence. Later he removed to Avignon where he was chaplain for nine years (1309–1318) to Cardinal Leonardo Patrasso, Bishop of Albano, and after the Cardinal's death in 1311 to his fellow-religious Cardinal William of Bayonne. Jacques Échard affirms that he was the close friend and often the confessor of John XXII, who appointed him Bishop of Torcello, March 15, 1318. A conflict with the Patriarch of Grado concerning the appointment of an abbess of Sant'Antonio di Torcello led to his excommunication in 1321, and exile. In 1323 he made peace with the patriarch, returned to his see, and died there in 1327.

== Works ==
Eight writings by Ptolemy have survived:

- De iurisdictione imperii et auctoritate summi pontificis (On the Jurisdiction of the Empire and the Authority of the Highest Pontiff), also called Determinatio compendiosa de iurisdictione imperii
- De operibus sex dierum (On the Works of the Six Days), also called Exameron
- De regimine principum (On the Government of Rulers)
- Annales (Annals)
- De origine ac translatione et statu Romani Imperii (On the Origin and Translation and State of the Roman Empire)
- De iurisdictione ecclesiae super regnum Apuliae et Siciliae (On the Jurisdiction of the Church over the Kingdom of Apulia and Sicily)
- Historia ecclesiastica nova (New Ecclesiastical History)
- A brief letter co-written with Prosper of Pistoia in 1307

In addition to these surviving writings, there are several cited but non-extant works of Ptolemy:

- Historia tripartita (Three-Part History), perhaps unfinished
- Historia quadripartita (Four-Part History), perhaps unfinished
- Catalogus imperatorum (Catalogue of the Emperors), perhaps merely planned but never written

Ptolemy also planned to write treatises on moral philosophy, household management and the virtues of rulers, but there is no evidence he ever did.

The best-known work of Ptolemy is his Annales (1061–1303), finished about 1307, wherein are recorded in terse sentences the chief events of this period. His Historia Ecclesiastica Nova in twenty-four books relates the history of the Church from the birth of Christ till 1294; considering as appendixes the lives of Pope Boniface VIII, Pope Benedict XI, and Pope Clement V, it reaches to 1314 (Muratori, loc. cit., XI, 751 sqq.; the life of Clement V is in Baluze, Vitae pap. Aven., 23 sqq.).

He also wrote a Historia Tripartita known only from his own references and citations. The Extract[us] de chronico Fr. Ptolomaei de Luca and the Excerpta ex chronicis Fr. Ptolomaei are no longer considered original works by separate authors, but are extracts from the Historia Ecclesiastica Nova by some unknown compiler who lived after the death of Ptolemy. He is also well known for his completion of the De Regimine Principum ("On the Government of Rulers"), which Aquinas had been unable to finish before his death. This was no small task, for the share of Ptolemy begins with the sixth chapter of the second book and includes the third and fourth books (vol. XVI, in the Parma, 1865, edition of Aquinas). Though he does not follow the order of the saint, yet his treatment is clear and logical. A committed republican, Ptolemy was central to developing a theory for the practices of Northern Italian republicanism and was the first writer to compare Aristotle's examples of mixed constitutions - Sparta, Crete, and Carthage - with the Roman Republic, the ancient Hebrew polity, the Church, and medieval communes, yet he remained a staunch defender of the absolute secular and spiritual monarchy of the pope.

A work on the Hexaemeron by him was published by Masetti in 1880. The lives of the Avignon popes were written from original documents under his hands and were controlled by the statements of eyewitnesses. His acceptance of fables now exploded, e.g. the Popess Joan, must be attributed to the uncritical temper of his time.

== Editions ==
- Ptolemy of Lucca (1997). On the Government of Rulers (De Regimine Principum). Translated by James M. Blythe. Philadelphia: University of Pennsylvania Press. ISBN 978-0812233704.
- Ptolemy of Lucca. Historia Ecclesiastica Nova: Nebst Fortsetzungen Bis 1329 [= New Ecclesiastical History, with continuations until 1329], ed. Ottavio Clavuot and Ludwig Schmugge. Monumenta Germaniae Historica, Scriptores, vol. 39 (Hannover, 2009).
