= Commenta in Ciceronis Rhetorica =

Commenta in Ciceronis Rhetorica is a work written by Gaius Marius Victorinus in the 4th century AD. It is the sole integral commentary on Cicero's De Inventione which survived. A new critical edition has been issued between 2013 and 2015.

== Bibliography ==
- Riesenweber, Thomas; C., Marius Victorinus (2013). Commenta in Ciceronis Rhetorica, Accedit incerti auctoris tractatus de attributis personae et negotio. Berlin, Boston: De Gruyter. ISBN 978-3-11-031366-6.
- Riesenweber, Thomas (2015). C. Marius Victorinus, "Commenta in Ciceronis Rhetorica", Band 1: Prolegomena. Band 2: Kritischer Kommentar und Indices (2 Bde. ed.). Berlin, Boston: De Gruyter. ISBN 978-3-11-031648-3.
