= Gratia non tollit naturam, sed perficit =

'Grace does not destroy nature, but perfects it,' phrase by Thomas Aquinas

Gratia non tollit naturam, sed perficit is translated as 'Grace does not destroy nature, but perfects it', or 'grace does not remove nature but fulfills it'. This phrase is a quote from Thomas Aquinas (c. 1224–1274).

== Theology ==
Thomas observes that "... grace does not destroy nature, but fulfills its potential ..." in his Summa Theologica. "Since therefore grace does not destroy nature but perfects it, natural reason should minister to faith as the natural bent of the will ministers to charity." Thomas maintains that the truth of human nature finds total fulfilment through sanctifying grace, since this is "perfectio naturae rationalis creatae" (Quaestiones quodlibetales, 4, 6).

He stated that grace does not contradict nature. God's creation cannot be totally corrupted by human sin; grace heals the incomplete natural notion of God. Aquinas divides grace into two basic kinds (ST I-II, III). One is gratia gratum faciens. This is commonly translated as "sanctifying grace". This is the grace that sanctifies an individual, granting the person a participation in the divine nature and ordering him to God as to one's supernatural end. It is this grace that receives the much greater part of the attention in the treatise on grace. The other kind of grace is gratia gratis data, commonly translated as "gratuitous grace". The phrase is not altogether happy; after all, the first kind of grace is also gratuitously, in the sense of freely, given by God. This gratuitous grace, in the technical sense, is given not for the sanctification of the recipient, but to allow the recipient to help others to God (I-II. III, 1c).

== See also ==
- Thomas Aquinas
- Divine grace
