= Clemens Baeumker =

German historian of philosophy

Clemens Baeumker (16 September 1853 – 7 October 1924) was a German historian of philosophy.

Baeumker was born in Paderborn to a gymnasium teacher. He studied philosophy, theology, and philology at Paderborn University and later at the University of Münster, from which he obtained a doctorate in 1877. From 1879, he was a teacher at a secondary school (Gymnasium) in Münster.

Through the efforts of Georg von Hertling he was appointed professor of philosophy at the University of Breslau in 1883, where he remained until 1900. In that year, he moved to the University of Bonn, and in 1903 to the University of Strasbourg, where he filled the chair vacated by Wilhelm Windelband. In 1912, he moved to the Ludwig-Maximilians-Universität München, filling the chair vacated by his friend von Hertling. He died in Munich in 1924.

Baeumker was known in particular for his studies in the history of medieval philosophy.

== Selected works ==
- Das Problem der Materie in der griechischen Philosophie, 1890
- The founder of the "Beiträge zur Geschichte der Philosophie des Mittelalters" (since 1891)
- Die europäische Philosophie des Mittelalters, 1909
- Roger Bacons Naturphilosophie, 1916
- Der Platonismus im Mittelalter, 1916
- Petrus von Hibernia der Jugendlehrer des Thomas von Aquino unde seine Disputation vor König Manfred, Munich, 1920.
