= Petrus de Ibernia =

Petrus de Ibernia, also known as Peter of Ireland, was a 13th-century writer and lecturer who is believed to have taught logic and natural philosophy to Thomas Aquinas.

Peter of Ireland is mentioned by the Aquinas' biographers Wilhelm of Tocco and Peter Calo.

== Career ==
Peter lectured in natural philosophy at the University of Naples during Thomas Aquinas's term of attendance (1239–1244). He was the author of 'Determinatio magistralis', "On the question that the bodily organs have been created in order that they might carry out their functions, or the functions created for the benefit of the organs." Peter felt this question to be purely a metaphysical one, despite his vocation being natural philosophy.

In 1260 he presided over a dispute on physics held before Manfred of Sicily.

Peter of Ireland studied Moses Maimonides with a Jewish–Christian group in the 1250s.

== His works ==
Works attributed to him include

- Two commentaries on Porphyry's Isagoge and the Perihermenias, both logical works
- A commentary on Aristotle's 'De longitudine et brevitate vitae', discussing physical questions on the nature and causes of life.

== Sources ==
- Clemens Baeumker, Petrus von Hibernia der Jugendlehrer des Thomas von Aquino unde seine Disputation vor König Manfred, Munich, 1920.
- A New History of Ireland, volume one, 2008, pp. 960–61.
