= Thomistic sacramental theology =

Catholic theology by St. Thomas Aquinas

Thomistic sacramental theology is St. Thomas Aquinas's theology of the sacraments of the Catholic Church. It can be found through his writings in the 13th-century works Summa contra Gentiles and in the Summa Theologiæ.

== General view of the sacraments ==
In the Catholic Church, there are seven sacraments: Baptism, Confirmation, Holy Eucharist, Penance, Extreme unction (also called "Anointing of the Sick"), Holy Orders, and Matrimony.

From Summa Contra Gentiles, Book 4:

since the spiritual remedies of salvation (as was said) have been given to men under sensible signs, it was suitable also to distinguish the remedies provided for the spiritual life after the likeness of bodily life. Now, in bodily life we find a twofold order: for some propagate and order the bodily life in others; and some are propagated and ordered in the bodily life. [...] [I]n the spiritual life, also, the first thing is spiritual generation: by baptism; the second is spiritual growth leading to perfect strength: by the sacrament of confirmation; the third is spiritual nourishment: by the sacrament of the Eucharist. A fourth remains, which is the spiritual healing; it takes place either in the soul alone through the sacrament of penance; or from the soul flows to the body when this is timely, through extreme unction. These, therefore, bear on those who are propagated and preserved in the spiritual life.
[...] Matrimony, then, in that it consists in the union of a husband and wife purposing to generate and educate offspring for the worship of God, is a sacrament of the Church; hence, also, a certain blessing on those marrying is given by the ministers of the Church.

Aquinas also states, in the Summa Theologica: "a sacrament is nothing else than a sanctification conferred on man with some outward sign. Wherefore, since by receiving orders a consecration is conferred on man by visible signs, it is clear that Order is a sacrament."

== Council of Trent ==
Thomistic sacramental theology was definitely confirmed by the Seventh Session (March 3, 1547) of the Council of Trent that elaborated 13 canons of the decree De sacramentis as a reply to the Protestant Reform (e. g. the Five solae).

== See also ==
- Anointing of the Sick in the Catholic Church
- Baptism (Catholic Church)
- Confirmation in the Catholic Church
- Eucharist in the Catholic Church
- Ex opere operato
- Holy orders in the Catholic Church
- Marriage in the Catholic Church
- Penance
- Sacramental matter and form
- Scholasticism
- Thought of Thomas Aquinas
- Validity and liceity (Catholic Church)
