= Gaius Marius Victorinus =

4th-century Roman philosopher and rhetorician

Gaius Marius Victorinus (also known as Victorinus Afer; fl. c. 355) was a Roman grammarian, rhetorician and Neoplatonic philosopher. Victorinus was African by birth and experienced the height of his career during the reign of Constantius II. He is also known for translating two of Aristotle's books from ancient Greek into Latin: the Categories and On Interpretation (De Interpretatione). Victorinus had a religious conversion, from being a pagan to a Christian, "at an advanced old age" (c. 355), which has been described in Augustine's Confessions.

== Life ==
=== Birthplace and early career ===
Victorinus, at some unknown point, left his home of North Africa to live permanently in Rome (hence some modern scholars have dubbed him Afer), probably for a teaching position, and had great success in his career, eventually being promoted to the lowest level of the senatorial order. That promotion probably came at the time when he received an honorific statue in the Forum of Trajan in 354. Victorinus' religious conversion to Christianity (c. 355), "at an advanced old age" according to Jerome, made a great impression on Augustine of Hippo, as recounted in Book 8 of the latter's Confessions. Marius Victorinus developed a theology of predestination and justification that anticipated St. Augustine, as well as themes that we find again in the anti-Pelagian treatises of Augustine. His conversion is historically important in foreshadowing the gradual conversion to Christianity of the traditionally pagan intellectual class.

Jerome, who was his student of rhetoric, dedicated the following words to him:

I am not unaware that Gaius Marius Victorinus, who taught me rhetoric in Rome when I was a young man, has published commentaries on the apostle; but, versed as he was in knowledge of secular literature, he was completely ignorant of the Scriptures; and no one, no matter how eloquent, can correctly discuss something he knows nothing about.

=== Victorinus' historical milieu ===
Brought up a Christian, Emperor Julian had converted to a philosophical and mystical form of paganism; and once in power upon the providential death of Constantius II, Julian attempted to reorganize the highly decentralized pagan cults, on lines analogous to the Christian Church. The emperor, wanting to purge the schools of Christian teachers, published an edict in June 362 mandating that all state appointed professors receive approval from municipal councils (the emperor's accompanying brief indicated his express disapproval of Christians lecturing on the poems of Homer or Virgil, because their religion was considered incongruous with the religion of Homer and Virgil).

Victorinus resigned his position as official rhetor of the city of Rome, a professor of rhetoric, not an orator. He continued writing treatises on Trinitarianism to defend the adequacy of the Nicene Creed's definition of Christ the Son being "of the same substance" (Gr. homoousios) with the Father. His writings illustrate a crucial fusion of Neo-Platonic philosophy and Christian theology, in which Victorinus effectively weaponized the former to prove and disprove arguments of the various Trinitarian debates raging during the fourth century. Sister Mary Clark has noted that the fourth century was one of deep conflict between pagans and Christians, which she summarized as "the renaissance of pagan culture [and] the birth of Christian culture", at the crossroads of which stood Victorinus. His importance is also seen in his large-scale use of lexical innovation (e.g. neologisms) to introduce new technical terms into Christian theological debates, especially in his translation of Greek theological and philosophical expressions (e.g. consubstantialis from ὁμοούσιος, consistentia from σύστασις, essentialitas from ὀντότης).

== Works ==
After finishing this series of works (begun probably in late 357), he turned his hand to writing commentaries on the Pauline Epistles, the first in Latin. Although it seems from internal references that he wrote commentaries on Romans and the Corinthians letters as well, all that remains are works, with some lacunae, on Galatians, Ephesians, and Philippians (the comments from the first 16 verses of this latter are missing).

We are fairly well informed on his previous works, mostly texts for his teaching areas of grammar and rhetoric. His most important works from the standpoint of the history of philosophy were translations of Platonist authors (Plotinus and Porphyry at least), which are unfortunately lost. They greatly moved Augustine and set him on a road of creating a careful synthesis of Christianity and Neoplatonism that was very influential. Victorinus wrote a brief treatise De Definitionibus (On Definitions), which lists and discusses various types of definitions used by rhetoricians and philosophers; he recommends the substantial definitions preferred by the latter (prior to the late 19th century, this work was ascribed to Boethius). Victorinus' manual of prosody, in four books, taken almost literally from the work of Aphthonius, still exists. His commentary on Cicero's De Inventione is very diffuse. It incorporates many paraphrases to enable students to understand Cicero's text, along with philosophical explanations and digressions that reflect its Neoplatonist character.

He retained his Neoplatonic philosophy after becoming Christian, and in Liber de generatione divini Verbi, he argues that God is above Being, and thus it can be said that He is not. Victorinus noted, "Since God is the cause of Being, it can be said in a certain sense, that God truly is (vere ων), but this expression merely means that Being is in God as an effect is in an eminent cause, which contains it though being superior to it." As well, Victorinus' Adversus Arium books ("Against Arius") would prove influential in blending Neo-Platonism and Christianity in the Latin West.

For medieval authors, Victorinus' works became important to students of the Scholastic movement. Later, they were widely used by Claudius of Turin at the beginning of the 9th century, by Haimo of Auxerre around 850 and by Atto of Vercelli around 920.

Sister Mary T. Clark has identified the following works attributed to Victorinus:

=== Theological works ===
- Candidi Arriani ad Marium Victorinum rhetorem de generatione divina (in Latin)
- De Generatione Divini Verbi. ad Candidum Arianum (in Latin)
- Marii Victorini rhetoris urbis Romae ad Candidum Arrianum
- Candidi Arriani epistola ad Marium Victorinum rhetorem (in Latin)
- Adversus Arium (in Latin) ("Against Arius")
  - I. Liber Primus
    - IA. pars prior
    - IB. pars posterior
  - II. Liber Secundus
  - III. Liber Tertius
  - IV. Liber Quartus
- De homoousio recipiendo
- Hymnus Primus
- Hymnus Secundus
- Hymnus Tertius

=== Exegetical works ===
- In epistolam Pauli ad Ephesios libri duo (in Latin)
- In epistolam Pauli ad Galatas libri duo (in Latin)
- In epistolam Pauli ad Philippenses liber unicus (in Latin)

=== Secular works ===
- Ars grammatica
- Explanationes in Ciceronis Rhetorica
- In Ciceronis Topica commenta (lost)
- De syllogismis hypotheticis (lost)

== See also ==
- Arianism
- Book of the 24 Philosophers
- Maria gens
- Neo-Platonism
- Trinitarianism
