= List of works by Thomas Aquinas =

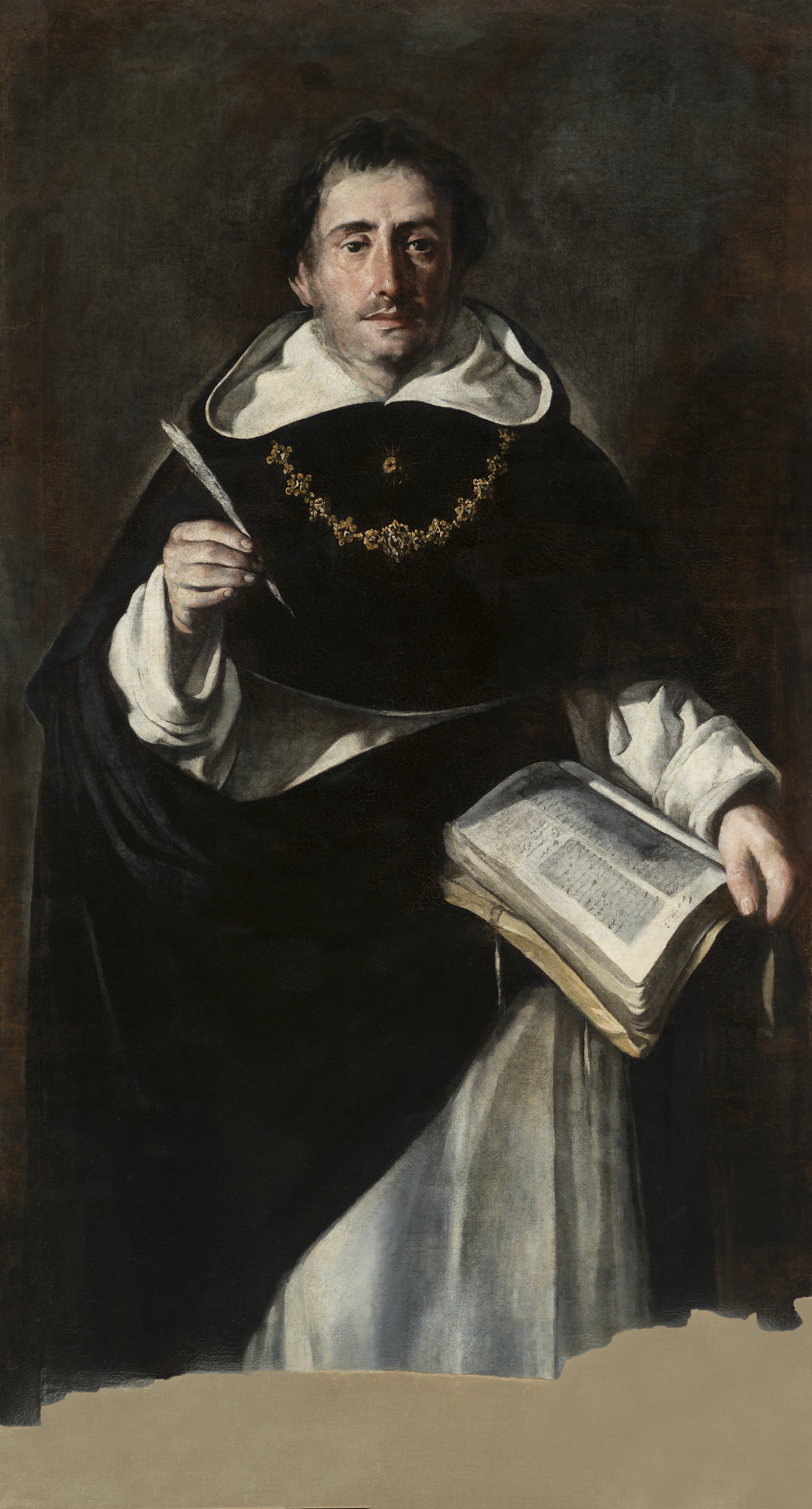
Thomas Aquinas by Bartolomé Esteban Murillo, 1650

The collected works of Thomas Aquinas are being edited in the Editio Leonina (established 1879). As of 2014, 39 out of a projected 50 volumes have been published.

The works of Aquinas can be grouped into six categories as follows:

1. Works written in direct connection to his teaching
  - Seven systematic disputations (quaestiones disputatae), on:
    - Truth;
    - The union of the Incarnate Word;
    - The soul;
    - Spiritual creatures;
    - Virtues;
    - God’s power; and
    - Evil.
  - Twelve quodlibetal disputations
2. Philosophical commentaries
  - Eleven commentaries on Aristotle;
  - Two expositions of works by Boethius;
  - Two expositions of works by Proclus
3. Lesser tractates and disputations
  - Five polemical works;
  - Five expert opinions, or responsa;
  - Fifteen letters on theological, philosophical, or political subjects;
  - Ninety-nine Homilies Upon the Epistles and Gospels for Forty-nine Sundays of the Year
  - A collection of glosses from the Church Fathers on the Gospels (Catena aurea)
4. Systematic works (Summa Theologiae, Summa contra Gentiles, and commentary on Peter Lombard's Sentences)
5. Biblical commentaries on Job, Psalms and Isaiah, Canticles and Jeremiah, John, Matthew, and on the epistles of Paul
  - Nine exegeses of Scriptural books
6. Liturgical works

In 1985 the Italian Thomist Battista Mondin, O.P., proposed the following classification: systematic works (In quattuor libros sententiarum, Summa contra Gentiles, Summa Theologiae, Compendium Theologiae); philosophical essays (De ente et essentia, De regimine principium; quaestiones disputatae (De veritate, De potentia, De malo, De anima, De virtutibus); free questions (which emerged during public disputes held in the Easter holidays at the University of Paris) (Quodlibeta VI-XI, Quodlibeta I-V e XII); philosophical commentaries (Physics e Metaphysics by Aristoteles, Ethica Nicomachea, Politica, Analytica posteriora, De coelo et mundo, De anima, De intepretatione; De hebdomadibus and the Boethius' De Trinitate; De divinis nominibus by Pseudo-Dionysius the Areopagite), the Neoplatonic origin of the Liber de causis (which Aquinas firstly recognized); biblical commentaries (Super Job ad litteram, Super Isaiam, Super Psalmos, Super Ieramiam,Expositio continua super IV Evangelia, also known asCatena aurea, Lectura super Matheum, Super Epistulas Pauli, Lectura Super Johannem).

== Editions ==
In 1570 the first edition of Aquinas's opera omnia, the so-called editio Piana (from Pius V, the Dominican pope who commissioned it), was produced at the studium of the Roman convent at Santa Maria sopra Minerva, the forerunner of the Pontifical University of Saint Thomas Aquinas, Angelicum. The critical edition of Aquinas's works is the ongoing edition commissioned by Pope Leo XIII (1882-1903), the so-called Leonine Edition. Abbé Migne published an edition of the Summa Theologiae, in four volumes, as an appendix to his Patrologiae Cursus Completus. English editions: Joseph Rickaby (London, 1872), J. M. Ashley (London, 1888).

== Works in chronological order ==
Title	Date
De fallaciis ad quosdam nobiles artistas	1245–1246
Commentary on the Prophet Jeremiah (Expositio in Jeremiam prophetam)	1248–52 (under Albert Magnus)
De propositionibus modalibus	by 1251
On the Principles of Nature (De principiis naturae ad fratrem Sylvestrum)	c. 1255
On Being and Essence (De ente et essentia, ad fratres socios)	1252–1256
Contra impugnantes Dei cultum et religionem	1256
Commentary on the Sentences of Peter Lombard (Scriptum super libros Sententiarum)	1252–1256
Two Sermons from MS Florence [Principium (?)]	1256 (?)
Disputed Questions on Truth (Quaestiones disputatae de Veritate)	1256–1259
Commentary on the Gospel of St. Matthew (Expositio in evangelicum s. Mattaei)	1256–1259 or 1269–1272
Literal Commentary on Job (Expositio in Job ad litteram)	1260
Commentary on Boethius's Book De hebdomadibus (Expositio in librum Boethii De hebdomadibus)	c. 1260
Commentary on Boethius's Book On the Trinity (Expositio super librum Boethii De Trinitate)	by 1261
De articulis fidei et Ecclesiae sacramentis, ad archiepiscopum Panormitanum	c. 1261
De emptione et venditione ad tempus	1262
Summa contra Gentiles (Tractatus de fide catholica, contra Gentiles [contra errores infidelium])	1261–1263
Against the Errors of the Greeks, to Pope Urban IV (Contra errores Graecorum, ad Urbanum IV Pontificem Maximum)	1263
Sermon on the Holy Eucharist preached in Consistory before Pope Urban IV and the Cardinals	1264
Officium de festo Corporis Christi, ad mandatum Urbani Papae IV	1264
On the Reasons of the Faith against the Saracens, Greeks and Armenians, to the Cantor of Antioch (De rationibus fidei contra Saracenos, Graecos et Armenos, ad Cantorem Antiochiae)	1261–1264
The Golden Chain (Glossa (expositio) continua in Mattheum, Marcum, Lucam, Joannem [Catena aurea])	1263ff.
Summa Theologica	1265–1273
Responsio ad fr. Joannem Vercellensem, Generalem Magistrum Ordinis Praedicatorum, de articulis CVIII ex opere Petri de Tarentasia	by 1266
Disputed Questions on the Soul (Quaestiones disputatae de Anima)	1267
On Kingship, to the King of Cyprus (De regno [De regimine principum), ad regem Cypri)	1267
Expositio in Dionysium De divinis nominibus	by 1268
Expositio super primam decretalem "De fide catholica et sancta Trinitate" et super secundam "Damnamus autem"	1259–1268
Disputed Questions on the Power of God (Quaestiones disputatae de potentia Dei)	1259–1268
Commentary on Aristotle's Posterior Analytics (In libros posteriorum Analyticorum expositio)	c. 1268
Commentary on Aristotle's De anima [On the Soul] (In libros De anima expositio)	c. 1268
Commentary on Aristotle's On Sense and What Is Sensed (In librum De sensu et sensato expositio)	c. 1268
Commentary of Aristotle's Memory and Recollection (In librum De memoria et reminiscentia expositio)	c. 1268
De substantiis separatis, seu de angelorum natura, ad fr. Reginaldum, socium suum carissimum	c. 1268
De secreto	by 1269
Disputed Questions on Spiritual Creatures (Quaestiones disputatae de spiritualibus creaturis)	1266–1269
De perfectione vitae spiritualis	1269
Commentary on the Book Of Causes (Super librum De causis expositio)	by 1270
On the Unity of the Intellect against the Averroists (De unitate intellectus, contra Averroistas)	1270
De perfectione vitae spiritualis	1270
Contra pestiferam doctrinam retrahentium pueros a religionis ingressu	1270
Sermons from MSS Madrid and Sevilla	1270
Two sermons from MS Paris	1270
Sermon on Christ the King from MS Soissons	1270
Commentary on the Eight Books of Physics (In octo libros Physicorum expositio)	1268–1271
De regimine Judaeorum, ad Ducissam Brabantiae	1270–1271
De aeternitate mundi, contra murmurantes	1271
Responsio ad fr. Joannem Vercellensem, Generalem Magistrum Ordinis Praedicatorum, de articulis XLII	1271
De motu cordis, ad Magistrum Philippum	1270–1271
De mixtione elementorum, ad Magistrum Philippum	c. 1271
Responsio ad lectorem Venetum de articulis XXXVI [two versions]	c. 1271
Commentary on the Prophet Isaiah (Expositio in Isaiam prophetam)	1256–1259 or 1269–1272
Four Exordia (Prothemata) of sermons from MS Angers	1269–1272
De forma absolutionis, ad Generalem Magistrum Ordinis	1269–1272
De occultis operationibus naturae, ad quendam militem ultramontanum	1269–1272
De sortibus ad Dominum Jacobum de ... (?)	1269–1272
Quaestiones disputatae de unione Verbi incarnati	1269–1272
Disputed Questions on Evil (Quaestiones disputatae de malo)	1269–1272
Disputed Questions on the Virtues (Quaestiones disputatae de virtutibus)	1269–1272
Commentary on the Gospel of John (Expositio in evangelium Joannis)	1269–1272
Commentary on Aristotle's Meteorology (In libros Meteorologicorum expositio)	1269–1271, 1269–1272 or 1272–1273
Commentary on Aristotle's On Interpretation (In libros Peri Hermeneias expositio)	1269–1272
Commentary on the Twelve Books of Metaphysics (In duodecim libros Metaphysicorum expositio)	1270–1272
Commentary on the Ten Books of [Nicomachean] Ethics (In decem libros Ethicorum expositio)	1271–1272
Commentary on Aristotle's Politics (In libros Politicorum expositio)	1271–1272
Quaestiones de quodlibet I-XII	1256–1259, 1269–1272
Commentary of the Epistles of St. Paul (Expositio in s. Pauli Epistolas)	1259–1265 and 1272–1273 (?)
Commentary on the Psalms of David (In Psalmos Davidis expositio)	1272–1273
Commentary on Aristotle's On the Heavens and Earth (In libros De caelo et mundo expositio)	1272–1273
Commentary on Aristotle's On Generation and Corruption (In libros De generatione et corruptione expositio)	1272–1273
Lenten Sermon-Cycle delivered at Naples (57 vernacular sermons, e.g., On the Two Laws of Charity and the Ten Commandments [De duobos praeceptis caritatis et decem legis praeceptis]; Devotissima expositio super symbolum apostolorum; Expositio devotissima orationis dominicae)	1273
Devotissima expositio super salutatione angelica	1269–1272 or 1273
Compendium of Theology (Compendium theologiae ad fratrem Reginaldum socium suum carissimum)	c. 1273 (?)
To Bernard, Abbot of Monte Cassino (Ad Bernardum, abbatem Cassinensem)	1274

== Works of uncertain date ==
De iudiciis astrorum, ad quendam militem ultramontanum
De modo studendi
Commentary on the Song of Songs (Expositio in Canticum Canticorum)
Commentary on the Lamentations of Jeremiah (Expositio in Threnos Jeremiae prophetae)
Hymn: "Adoro te"
Hymn: "Concede mihi misericors Deus"
Hymn: "Tantum Ergo" from Pange Lingua, a Mediaeval Hymn
Quaestio disputata utrum anima coniuncta cognoscat seipsam per essentiam
Disputed Questions on the Immortality of the Soul (Quaestiones disputatae de immortalitate animae)
Responsio ad lectorem Bisuntinum de articulis VI
Three sermons from MS Paris
Three sermons from MS Venice

== Works of uncertain authenticity ==
De demonstratione
De instantibus
De natura accidentium
De natura generis
De natura materiae et dimensionibus interminalis
De quatuor oppositis
De natura verbi intellectus
De principio individuationis
Sermon: Beata Virgo nec originale nec mortale nec veniale peccatum incurrit, 1269–1272 or 1273
