= De principiis naturae, ad fratrem Sylvestrum =

Treatise by Thomas Aquinas (c.1255)

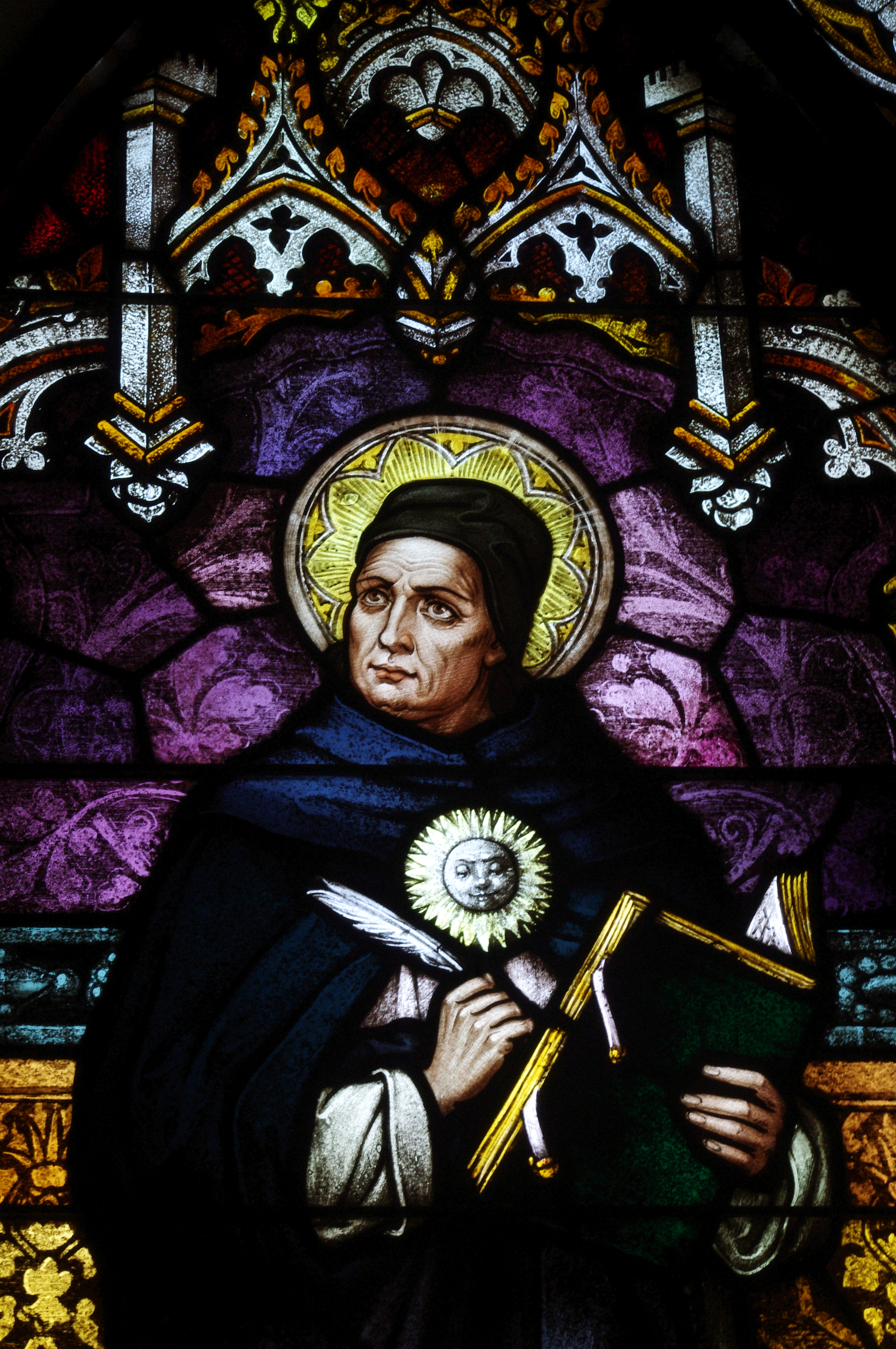
Stained-glass window depicting Thomas Aquinas at the Saint Joseph's Catholic Church of Central City, Kentucky.

De principiis naturae, ad fratrem Sylvestrum (lit. 'On the principles of nature, to brother Sylvester') is a philosophical treatise written by Saint Thomas Aquinas around 1255, what makes it one of his earliest works. Addressed to the Dominican Sylvester, it develops on natural philosophy from an Aristotelian point of view.

== Context ==
De principiis naturae was produced during Thomas' baccalaureate, a time in which he also wrote De ente et essentia. Both works have an introductory approach which makes them useful in presenting the author's philosophical vocabulary, and are usually dated aroung 1255. De principiis naturae is focused on "illustrating the principles that we can use to read the structure of natural reality".

The text is devoted to explaining the five principles of nature put forward by the Aristotelian tradition: matter, form, privation, agent and end. Such philosophical school had developed on them both as ontological principles found in physical things and as cognitional principles essential to scientific enquiry. In his commentary on Aristotle's Physics, Aquinas distinguishes the approach used in the first book as focused on the "principles of natural things" and that of the second book as focused on the "principles of natural science". De principiis naturae is based on the latter point of view.

Avicenna and Averroes have been proposed as particularly significant influences on the work's production, as probably Aquinas had made recourse to them due to the limitations of Michael Scot's Aristotelian translations. According to H. Dondaine, a responsible of the Editio Leonina, "[t]he only one trait one can assert without contest is the role of the Commentaries of Averroes, the almost exclusive source of the opusculum", a conclusion based on Aquinas' treatment of analogy in the sixth chapter. This opinion has been questioned, however, as other parts of the work seem to show a remarkable influence from Avicenna's Physics, which features a discussion on the scientific principles of nature in its first book.

== Doctrine ==
=== Chapter 1 ===
The work begins with an analysis of change as a concept. Considering that everything that is to be seen in nature seems to be subject to change, such change cannot be described as a passage from absolute nothingness to being, but rather from being in a certain mode and under a determinate form to being in another mode and under another form. Aquinas follows Aristotle in explaining change as a transition from being in potency to being in act.

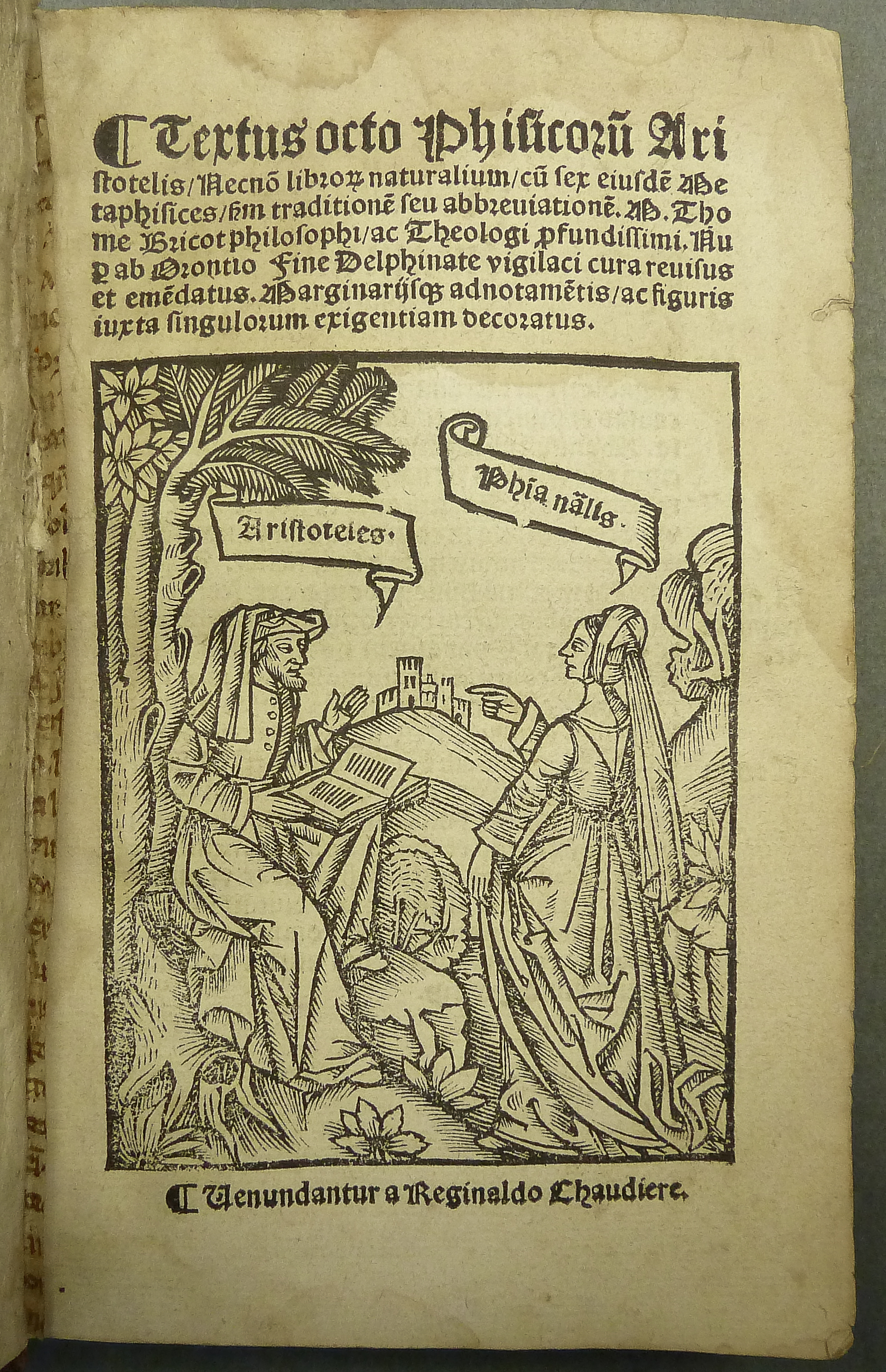
Woodcut depicting Aristotle conversing with an allegorical figure named "Philosophia naturalis".

Subsequently, the author distinguishes being as a twofold concept which can be applied both to "substantial being" and to "accidental being". Substantial being is that which is proper to every substance as substance, while accidental being is that proper to an accident that can inhere in a substance. Aquinas exemplifies the latter with the whiteness of a man, which does not define "man" as such because it is not part of the definition of the substance "man". Substantial being is presented as absolute insofar as it does not depend on another, while accidental being is relative because it cannot be obtained without the former as it is added onto it.

Following the Aristotelian theory of forms, every form is said to require a potential substratum to receive it, which is identified as "matter" by Aquinas. Matter is something that can receive different forms and must be understood in a twofold way. From a substantial point of view one may speak of a "matter from which", while from an accidental point of view it is present as a "matter in which". Regarding the substantial being of man, Aquinas exemplifies by saying that the "matter from which" man is originated as a substance is to be found in sperm and menstrual blood (following the consensus of the epoch), whereas the aforementioned whiteness as an accident has the man as a "matter in which". More properly speaking, the matter of accidental being can be called "subject" and the matter which has the potential to be substantial being can be called "material". A subject already possesses a complete being, while matter receives it from what comes to it (the substantial form) as it has an incomplete being in itself. Therefore matter depends on the substantial form for its being, while the accident depends on the subject.

As such being is received in act, Aquinas teaches that every form (substantial or accidental) must be in act. This implies a strict correspondence between potency and matter, and between act and form. On the metaphysical plane, the author later explains, this conclusion is to be rejected.

According to Aquinas, forms are received through the transition from potency to act in the process of generation. Two kinds of generation are distinguished: in its proper sense, generation implies the acquisition of a substantial form; while in a relative or accidental sense, an entity can acquire an accidental form such as being white or black. The cession by a form of its place to other is called "corruption", a process that can also be distinguished regarding its proper sense (losing the previous substantial form) and its accidental sense (losing an accidental form). All processes in nature, therefore, imply generation or corruption, and passage from being in potency to being in act and vice-versa. The only passage from absolute non-being to being is the divine Creatio ex nihilo, which is known through revelation despite being denied by some natural philosophers.

Aquinas concludes that three principles can be said to act in nature: being in potency, privation, and being in act (or as Aristotle put it, matter or substratum, privation and form). The theologian exemplifies with a copper statue, in which matter (copper) with the potentiality of being a statue first suffers a privation (not having the shape or figure of a statue) and then receives the form that shall give it the characteristics of a statue. This does not imply that the rough copper in the beginning did not have a substantial form which made it copper instead of any other metal. Matter is never found in nature without any form, as prime matter is only a mental concept, but in order to become a statue it must take a form different to its previous one.

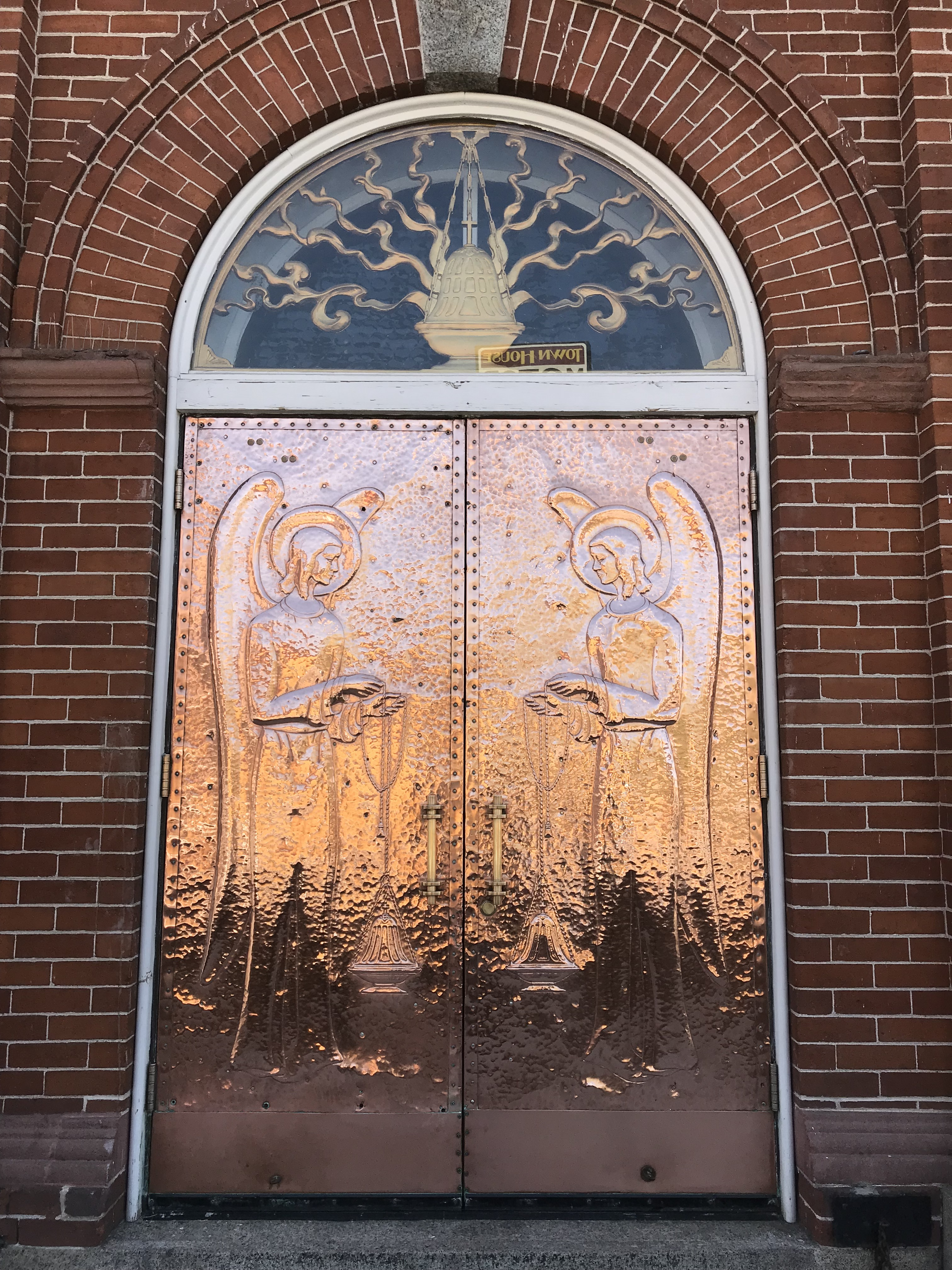
Copper front doors at the Saint Thomas Aquinas Cathedral of Reno, Nevada.

=== Chapters 2 to 5 ===
Aquinas continues developing on the three principles of nature in the second and third chapters. The author describes matter and privation as identical in subject but conceptually different as, in the copper that has not been made into a statue yet, what is copper and what is shapeless is the same despite both descriptions originate from distinct reasons. Privation is equal to matter in a real sense, although they can be distinguished as the former is not a generic potency but a determinate potency towards a determinate form. This implies that matter and privation coincide at the beginning of the process of generation, but differ at its end as the matter remains under another form which has absorbed the privation.

Aquinas follows Aristotle in affirming that forms are not generated nor corrupted, unlike substances. Matter and form, as the essential principles of generation and corruption, are not subject to such process as that would imply an infinite regress. The process of change is therefore circunscribed to substances, the composite of both principles. These principles are not enough to describe change, nevertheless, as the existence of an efficient cause or motor cause is also needed for the process to begin. Furthermore, as all change is undertaken in order to reach an end (conscious or not), natural processes also require a final cause.

The author arrives to Aristotle's five conditions for natural processes, namely three principles (matter, privation and form) and four causes (material, formal, agent and final). The material and formal causes are equal to matter and form. Aquinas applies this distinction as it is found at Aristotle's Physics, keeping in mind that the philosopher had called extrinsic causes "principles" and intrinsic causes "elements" at his Metaphysics. The saint does not see this as problematic, and stresses the fact that privation cannot be a cause because it does not contribute to the being of the generated substance, but is expected to disappear in the process. The efficient and final causes, similarly, cannot be described as principles because they are mostly extrinsic to the newly generated substance, but are indeed causes as they do contribute to what is being generated. Aquinas develops further on causality and hylomorphism in the fourth and fifth chapters.

=== Chapter 6 ===
The sixth chapter of De principiis naturae is devoted to introducing the theologian's views on "analogy". Aquinas contends that something can be predicated of multiple things in three different ways: univocally (when the same word has strictly the same meaning in different things), equivocally (when the same word is used to designate a number of things with a different meaning for each) and analogically (when the same word is used at different things while keeping relationship to some principal meaning). Thomas makes use of Aristotle's treatment of the word "healthy" in his Metaphysics, in which the same word is applied to a body, to a food and to urine as, despite not meaning strictly the same, all definitions converge towards the concept of health. Aquinas teaches that analogously common principles perform the same function or are in the same relationship despite differing in being. The author finishes his work by summing up the different forms of identity which can be found, either in individuals (numerical identity), in species (specific identity), in genera (generic identity) and between genera (analogical identity).

== See also ==
- Analogia entis
- Aristotelian physics
- Condemnations of 1210–1277
- De aeternitate mundi, contra murmurantes
- De motu cordis, ad Magistrum Philippum
- List of works by Thomas Aquinas

== Bibliography ==
- Houser, R. E. (2012). "Avicenna and Aquinas's De Principiis Naturae, cc. 1–3". The Thomist: A Speculative Quarterly Review. 76 (4): 577–610. doi:10.1353/tho.2012.0002. ISSN 2473-3725.
- Porro, Pasquale (2016). Thomas Aquinas: a historical and philosophical profile. Washington, D.C: Catholic University of America Press. ISBN 978-0-8132-2805-1.
