= Commentary on the Book of Causes (Aquinas) =

Work by Thomas Aquinas (c.1272)

Drawing of an elderly Thomas Aquinas by Leopold Bode (1862)

Commentary on the Book of Causes (Latin: Super librum De causis expositio) is a philosophical and theological commentary on the Book of Causes produced by Saint Thomas Aquinas in 1272.

== Background ==
Aquinas produced the text during the first half of 1272, what makes it one of his last works. Contemporary to the writing of the Summa Theologica and of many of his main commentaries on Aristotle, the saint probably decided to compose the book after reading William of Moerbeke's translation of Proclus' Elements of Theology, through which he realized that the Pseudo-Aristotelian Liber de Causis was mostly derived from such text.

Controversies regarding the authorship of the Book of Causes started soon after its introduction into the University of Paris. The work had reached medieval Europe through a translation by Gerard of Cremona and was attributed to Aristotle as a continuation of his Metaphysics. Despite the enforcement of the Condemnations of Paris, the book became increasingly popular as it was seen as congruent with Biblical cosmology and was widely read and studied. Its Aristotelian authorship, however, was soon questioned by Albertus Magnus, who claimed that the work had been composed by a Spanish Jew contemporary to Gerard, named Ibn Daoud. Thomas may have doubted of its attributed authorship before reading William's translation, as some of the Book's quotations on his previous works have a reluctant tone.

Aquinas had first come into contact with the Liber at least while studying the Sentences of Peter Lombard, and had quoted it repeatedly in his Disputed Questions on Truth, on the Soul, on God's power and on Evil. The Book is quoted as Aristotle's in his Expositio super librum Boethii De Trinitate. In his Commentary on the Sentences, however, Aquinas already states that many nuclear theses of the work are incompatible with Aristotelianism and notices the author's affinity with Plato.

The Book had already been commented by notable European thinkers such as Roger Bacon, Giles of Rome, Henry of Ghent and Siger of Brabant. Albertus Magnus had already produced a commentary between 1265 and 1272, but probably had no knowledge of Moerbeke's translation nor of Aquinas commentary, as he does not note any connection between the pseudo-Aristotelian work and Proclus', and assumes it to be a compilation of sayings of Aristotle, Avicenna, Al-Ghazali and Al-Farabi by "David the Jew".

Aquinas' commentary was classified as an "Opuscle" in the 1927 edition of his Opera Omnia by Pierre Mandonnet. As it is usually included among his large commentaries, this is not the case in any older compilation.

== Teaching ==
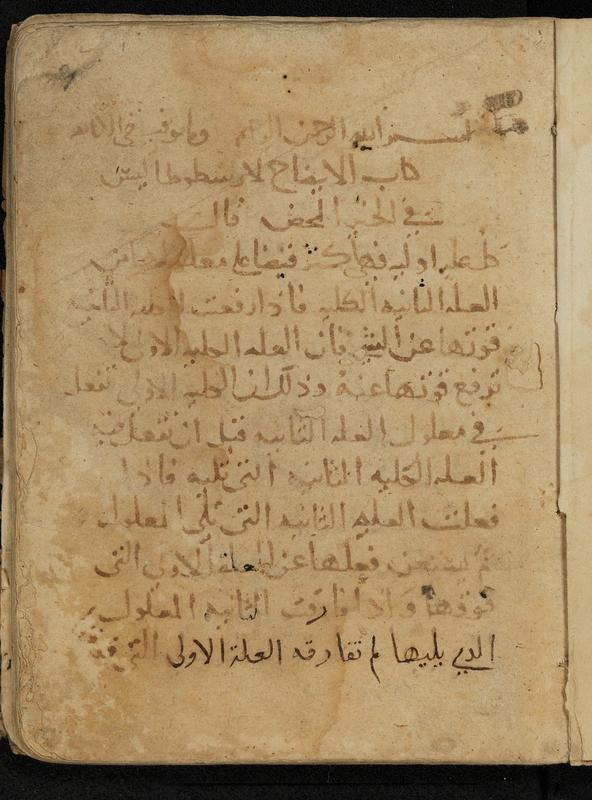
First page of an Arabic manuscript of the Liber de Causis, stored at the Leiden University Library.

Aquinas attributes the work to an unknown Arabic author, who had excerpted it from Proclus' Elements of Theology as a primary source. Therefore, the Elements are taken as a companion throughout the whole commentary and, keeping in mind that both the Arabic author and Proclus were not thinkers in the Christian tradition, the teachings of Pseudo-Dionysius the Areopagite are used to evaluate them. Comparisons between Aristotelian and Neoplatonic thought are also present, as the saint is closer to the former school. These aspects make the commentary closer to a compared theology book than to a plain exposition of the work's doctrine.

Thomas documents that at least 37 of the 211 propositions of Proclus' Elements can be related to the Liber. As such, the latter appears as a compendium of the essential teachings of the former. However, the Book of Causes seems to reformulate the original doctrine in order to follow a creationist point of view, what differs from Proclus' Neoplatonic approach and becomes closer to biblical teaching.

Thomas also realizes that the later author sometimes breaks his own method of exposition and causes inconsistencies, what can be seen as a weakness. Many issues can be identified at the work from the Doctor's viewpoint: the fact that the First Cause alone gives being to all entities is not explained in terms of potentiality and actuality; being and life are expressed as "two intelligences", "two lives" or "two beings" depending on whether the context implies intelligence, life or being; intelligences are presented as eternal while the First Cause is said to be "before and above eternity", among others.

The commentary begins with a straightforward rejection of Proclus' teaching, as Aquinas states that what is first in the order of being is last in the order of human knowing. Following Aristotle, what is taught in the book is described as not immediately knowable nor self-evident, and is set at the end of philosophical inquiry instead of at the beginning. Arriving at such knowledge, Thomas contends, requires first an instruction in logic, natural philosophy and philosophical anthropology, and shall never produce a perfect and full outcome during earthly life. Aquinas seems to understand the work as dealing with metaphysics rather than with theology proper, and therefore he uses the four causes theory in his interpretation of the first proposition.

Causality is a central topic of the commentator's analysis, particularly regarding the relationship between primary and secondary causes. Aquinas affirms that the former's power extends to the latter as "the first cause itself produces and moves the cause acting secondarily and so becomes the cause of its acting" and "the activity by which the second cause causes an effect is caused by the first cause, for the first cause aids the second cause, making it to act. Therefore, the first cause is more a cause than the second cause of that activity in virtue of which an effect is produced by the second cause". The theologian uses explicit Neoplatonic terminology in stating that secondary causes participate in the divine causality, of which their activity is a product. Therefore Aquinas contends that the actions performed by instrumental causes have their root in their participation pertaining to being and action. This implies the extension of providence to all created things, as "what is essentially act and goodness, namely God, essentially and originally communicates his goodness to things. This belongs to his rule, for it is proper for a ruler to lead those that are ruled to their appropriate end, which is the good...And so, the rule of the first cause, which is according to the essence of goodness, extends to all things".

Thomas notes the author's effort to drift from Proclus' polytheism, in which a number of depersonalized divine "henads" serve as subsisting ideas and are the second level of a threefold hierarchy that has the unparticipated One in its highest position, and that which participates (either knowingly or unknowingly as intelligences or simply temporal beings) in the lowest. The Liber avoids this position by eliminating completely the second hierarchs ("the participated") and leaving only the first and the third positions, what is more congruent with a creationist perspective in which the First Cause is a sufficient explanation for knowing and being.

Nonetheless, Aquinas affirms several times that many of the book's views had been better expressed by Proclus than by the work's author, what has been attributed either to the low-quality translation of the Liber used or simply to Proclus' philosophical proficiency. The theologian makes use of Pseudo-Dionysius the Areopagite and other Church Fathers in order to demonstrate which teachings of the Liber are closer to Christian doctrine than those of the original text. Such sources are sometimes used directly to correct either Proclus or the author in order to defend Catholic doctrine, while Aristotle is also invoked in order to refute those philosophical positions closer to Platonism.

== See also ==
- Christianity and Neoplatonism
- Compendium Theologiae (Aquinas)
- De aeternitate mundi, contra murmurantes
- List of works by Thomas Aquinas
- Thomism

== Bibliography ==
- Cruz, Juan (2000). "Fuentes neoplatónicas de la metafísica de la causalidad en Super Librum de Causis expositio". Exposición sobre el "Libro de las causas". Colección de pensamiento medieval y renacentista (in Spanish) (1st ed.). Pamplona: Ediciones Universidad de Navarra. ISBN 978-84-313-1773-7. OCLC 44182135.
- Guagliardo, Vincent A. (1996). "Introduction". In Guagliardo, Vincent A.; Hess, Charles R.; Taylor, Richard C. (eds.). Commentary on the Book of causes. Thomas Aquinas in translation. Washington, D.C: Catholic University of America Press. pp. ix–xxxii. ISBN 978-0-8132-0843-5.
- Silva, Ignacio (2019-08-20). "Aquinas and the Metaphysics of Divine Providence De Potentia Dei 3, 7 and Super Librum de Causis Expositio". Studium. Filosofía y Teología. 22 (43): 53–72. doi:10.53439/stdfyt43.22.2019.53-72. ISSN 2591-426X.
