= De iudiciis astrorum (Aquinas) =

Letter by Thomas Aquinas

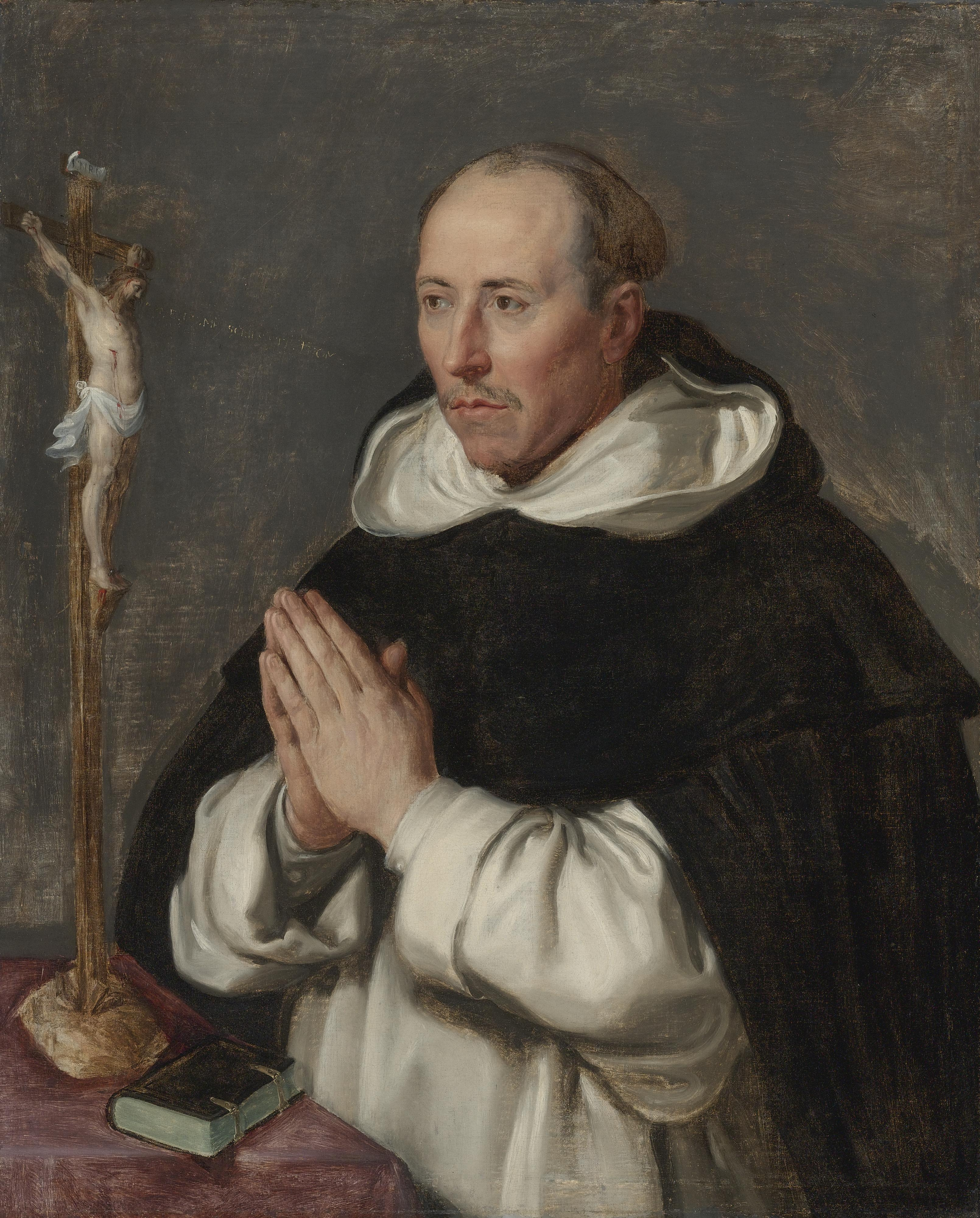
17th-century painting of a Dominican friar praying, presumably Thomas Aquinas, by the circle of Peter Paul Rubens.

De iudiciis astrorum (lit. 'On the judgement of stars') is a brief letter written by the Catholic Saint Thomas Aquinas to his friend Reginald of Piperno, on the subject of astrological speculations.

== Content ==
The text begins by claiming to follow the teachings of the Fathers of the Church. Quoting Augustine, Aquinas starts by acknowledging the influence of celestial bodies on sublunar natural events. The theologian contends that making recourse to the stars is not an evil if such inquiry is circumscribed to the physical aspects of nature, as farmers keep celestial bodies in mind when choosing the adequate time to perform specific works, sailors do the same in order to choose the days in which they shall sail, and doctors keep them in mind when treating their patients. Aquinas departs from Augustine on this subject, as the latter had condemned the use of astral indagation in those cases as well.

The author warns, however, of the illicit and erroneous nature of consulting the stars in order to learn about human actions, as free will is not subject to the celestial bodies.

But one thing must be absolutely certain, namely, that the human will is not subject to the necessity of the stars. If this were so, free will would disappear, and without it we could not attribute merit to good deeds or fault to bad deeds. And so every Christian must hold quite firmly that the things that depend on the human will-that is, all human operations-are not subject to the necessity of the stars.

Aquinas proceeds by mentioning how demons may interfere in the outcome of astrological research, what would cause the predictive results to be a product of an implicit or explicit pact with evil and therefore an "execrable" and gravely sinful practice. Following Augustine's Literal commentary on Genesis and De doctrina christiana, Aquinas states that astrological predictions which seem to be accurate are not but demonic crafts and are to be rejected.

== Context and legacy ==
Produced between 1269 and 1272 according to Ptolemy of Lucca, De iudiciis astrorum was written during Aquinas' second regency at Paris and was probably addressed to Reginald of Piperno. Its production coincides in time with that of the Secunda-Secundae Partis of the Summa Theologiae, in which Thomas starkly condemns astrology and divination in the questions 92-95.

The work is deeply connected with the author's De sortibus, as both were written in the context of a long papal sede vacante which coincided with the recent death of the bishop of Vercelli. A draw in the election of the latter's successor, which was proposed to be solved by casting lots, may have inspired the production of both texts. The conflicts at the University of Paris due to the Condemnations of 1210–1277, in which Aristotelians were charged with denying the universality of divine providence and with teaching determinism, may also have sparked Thomas' interest in dealing with such subjects. Indeed, a condemned proposition at Paris asserted that "our will is subject to the power of celestial bodies", and Aquinas' teacher Albertus Magnus had already developed thoroughly on the influence held by cosmic factors on the physical characteristics of newborns.

The aid of navigation, medicine and agriculture as a legitimate motif for the consultation of the stars was included in the rule IX of the Index Librorum Prohibitorum, despite not explicit mentions to Thomas' work are made.

== See also ==
- Albertus Magnus
- De aeternitate mundi, contra murmurantes
- De motu cordis, ad magistrum Philippum
- Medieval medicine of Western Europe
- Microcosm–macrocosm analogy

== Bibliography ==
- Medina Delgadillo, Jorge; Castro Manzano, José Martín (2019). "Dos opúsculos de Tomás de Aquino: Sobre las suertes y Sobre el juicio de los astros". Revista de filosofía open insight (in Spanish). 10 (18): 217–277. doi:10.23924/oi.v10n18a2019.pp25p.322 (inactive 1 July 2025). ISSN 2007-2406.
- Porro, Pasquale (2016). Thomas Aquinas: a historical and philosophical profile. Washington, D.C: Catholic University of America Press. ISBN 978-0-8132-2805-1.
- Rutkin, H. Darrel (2019). "Is Astrology a Type of Divination? Thomas Aquinas, the Index of Prohibited Books, and the Construction of a Legitimate Astrology in the Middle Ages and the Renaissance" (PDF). International Journal of Divination and Prognostication. 1 (1): 36–74. doi:10.1163/25899201-12340003. hdl:10278/3728111.
- Tarrant, Neil (2020-01-02). "Reconstructing Thomist astrology: Robert Bellarmine and the papal bull Coeli et terrae*". Annals of Science. 77 (1): 26–49. doi:10.1080/00033790.2020.1714286. ISSN 0003-3790. PMID 32134363.
