= De Regno =

De Regno may refer to:

- De Regno (Synesius) - 4th Century Speech by Synesius
- De Regno, to the King of Cyprus - 1267 Work by Thomas Aquinas
