= De regimine Judaeorum, ad Ducissam Brabantiae =

Epistle by Thomas Aquinas

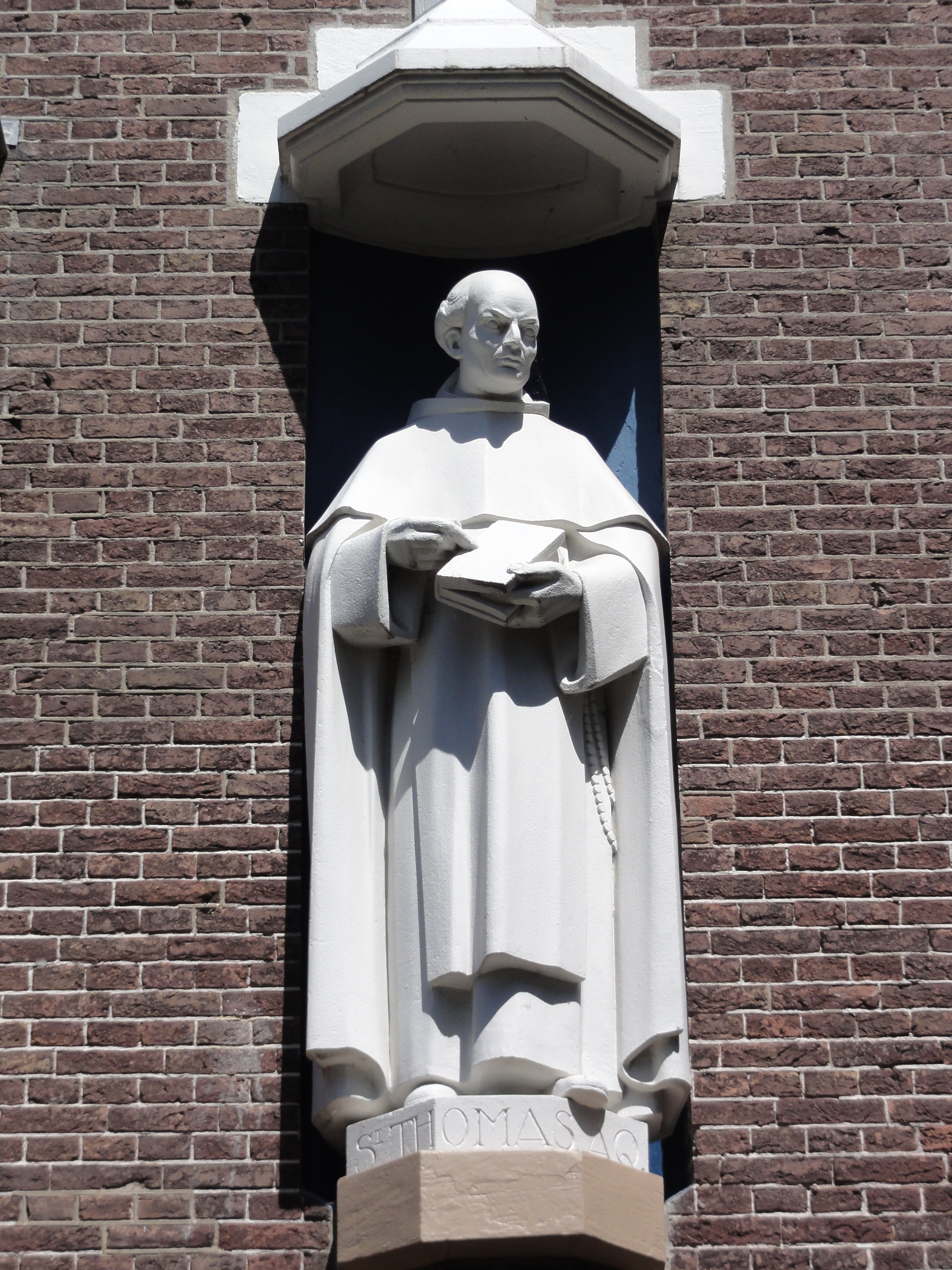
Statue of Saint Thomas Aquinas at the Dominican cloister of Huissen, Lingewaard.

De regimine Judaeorum, ad Ducissam Brabantiae (lit. 'On the government of the Jews, to the Duchess of Brabant'), also known as the Epistula ad Ducissam Brabantiae, is an epistle written by Dominican friar and Catholic saint Thomas Aquinas to Adelaide of Burgundy, Duchess of Brabant.

Despite its briefness, De regimine Judaeorum soon became one of the most widely quoted short works by Aquinas and has been characterized as a relevant document to understand the doctor's personal opinions on Judaism, as it deviates from the rather systematic approach used in the Summa Theologiae.

== Context ==
Coat of arms of the Duchy of Brabant.

The letter was written during Adelaide's regency (1261–1268) after the death of Duke Henry III of Brabant, who had four underage children of which the oldest was near to 10 years old. Up to the taking of power by John the Victorious after the disinheritance of Henry IV, the duchy suffered great instability not only due to pressures from the local and foreign nobility, eager to seize power over the realm, but also from the increasing political power of cities which would later constitute the États de Brabant. During the first two years of the regency, at least seventeen towns and villages had entered into reciprocal alliance pacts in case of a future war, and the estates intervention would later prove influential to depose Henry IV and name John as the lawful successor.

The ducal family held close relations with the Dominican Order. Henry III had chosen two friars as executors of his will and asked to be buried at the Dominican cloister of Leuven. In 1263, Adelaide built a house for the order at the same city and expressed her desire to spend her last years at a Dominican convent. She also established the Priory of Val Duchesse at Auderghem during her regency. Her devotion to the order is praised by Thomas in the letter.

The will and testament signed by Henry III in February 1261 has been pointed out by historians as a key motive for the duchess' request of Aquinas' help. Aside from granting jurisprudential rights to subjects and determining four causes by which they could ask for financial aid, in the context of other economic issues there was the order to carry out the expulsion of the Jews and cahorsins from the realm in case they persisted in the sin of usury.

Some historians have questioned the date of the letter and proposed it may have been addressed to Margaret of France, Duchess of Brabant and wife of John I, and written in 1270.

== Doctrine ==
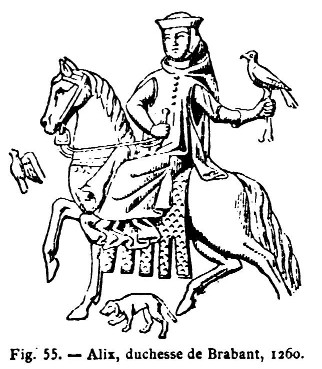
Adelaide of Burgundy, Duchess of Brabant (1233–1273)

The work consists of eight answered questions. Aquinas supports his views by quoting the Bible eleven times and the Fourth Council of the Lateran once. Five questions address the treatment of Jewish subjects, of which three deal with the issue of usury, while the other three regard topics such as the sale of offices to bailiffs and other officials, levying taxes and forced loans from Christian subjects, and handling the illicit revenues extorted by officials. As roughly half of the treatise is not concerned with the Jews, some commentators have preferred to style the work with other titles such as De regimine Subditorum or Determinatio quorundam casuum ad comitissam Flandrie.

Aquinas recommended policies were meant to "insulate the faithful from the influence of unbelievers" and included making Jews wear distinctive garbs, prohibiting their employment of Christians, and forcing them to live at ghettos. The doctor also supported the imposition of harsh taxation on them, as "earthly lords may take their property as though it were their own, provided only that the things necessary to sustain life are not withdrawn from them". Nevertheless, and despite describing the Jews as in a state of "perpetual slavery", the friar stated that "forced service should not be exacted of them" and advised the duchess to follow the customs of her predecessors regarding their treatment. These policies were notably more indulgent that those recommended towards Christian heretics, as Jews were not to be a target of official violent persecution and would be tolerated in their beliefs.

Regarding the morality of taxation on Christians, Aquinas briefly argues that the prince is justified in doing so in order to fulfill the duty of fighting for the common good.

== See also ==
- De regno, ad regem Cypri
- History of European Jews in the Middle Ages
- Sicut Judaeis

== Bibliography ==
- Dorin, Rowan (2016). "Les maîtres parisiens et les Juifs (fin XIIIe siècle) : perspectives nouvelles sur un dossier d'avis concernant le regimen Iudaeorum". Journal des savants (in French). 2 (1): 241–282. doi:10.3406/jds.2016.6381. ISSN 0021-8103.
- Imparato, Mary (October 2020). On religious toleration: prudence and charity in Augustine, Aquinas, and Tocqueville (PhD dissertation thesis). State University of New Jersey.
- Kusman, David (1995). "À propos de la consultation de Thomas d'Aquin par la duchesse Aleyde de Brabant (ca. 1267)". Revue belge de Philologie et d'Histoire (in French). 73 (4): 937–946. doi:10.3406/rbph.1995.4055.
- Meredith, Christopher Todd (2008). "The ethical basis for taxation in the thought of Thomas Aquinas". Journal of Markets & Morality. 11 (1): 41–57.
