= René-Antoine Gauthier =

French-Dominican and Philosophical Historian

René Antoine Gauthier (1913–1999) was a French Dominican friar, philologist and historian of philosophy.

Gauthier joined the Dominican order as a novice in 1933, in the Lyon province, taking his professio on 3 November 1934. He studied in Saint-Alban-Leysse. After his military service of 1936–1937 he was ordained in 1940. Suffering from tuberculosis, he spent 1941-42 and again 1947-49 convalescing in the Assy sanatorium. His dissertation on magnanimitas was completed in 1942 (published 1951).

He joined the Commissio Leonina in 1952. During the 1950s to 1970s, during which time he resided in Le Saulchoir, L'Arbresle, Santa Sabina and in Grottaferrata, he was the editor of the editions of several of Aquinas' Aristotelian commentaries, including Expositio libri Peryermenias, Expositio libri Posteriorum, Quaestiones De potentia Dei, Quaestiones de quolibet'', Sentencia libri De anima, De memoria et reminiscencia, Sententia libri Ethicorum, Tabula libri Ethicorum. He also edited the medieval translations of Aristotle's Nicomachean Ethics and wrote an original monograph on Aristotle's ethics and with Jean-Yves Jolif published a translation of Aristotle's Ethics with extensive commentary in 1959.

== Bibliography ==
- René Antoine Gauthier (O.P.), Jean Yves Jolif (O.P.), L' Éthique à Nicomaque. Introduction, traduction et commentaire. T. I: Introduction et traduction. Publications Universitaires, Louvain; B. Nauwelaerts, Paris 1959. T. II: Commentaire. Publications Universitaires, Louvain; B. Nauwelaerts, Paris 1959.
