= Summum bonum =

Latin expression meaning the highest or ultimate good

Summum bonum is a Latin expression meaning the highest or ultimate good, which was introduced by the Roman philosopher Cicero to denote the fundamental principle on which some system of ethics is based—that is, the aim of actions, which, if consistently pursued, will lead to the best possible life. Since Cicero, the expression has acquired a secondary meaning as the essence or ultimate metaphysical principle of Goodness itself, or what Plato called the Form of the Good. These two meanings do not necessarily coincide. For example, Epicurean and Cyrenaic philosophers claimed that the 'good life' consistently aimed for pleasure, without suggesting that pleasure constituted the meaning or essence of Goodness outside the ethical sphere. In De finibus, Cicero explains and compares the ethical systems of several schools of Greek philosophy, including Stoicism, Epicureanism, Aristotelianism and Platonism, based on how each defines the ethical summum bonum differently.

The term was used in medieval philosophy. In the Thomist synthesis of Aristotelianism and Christianity, the highest good is usually defined as the life of the righteous and/or the life led in communion with God and according to God's precepts. In Kantianism, it was used to describe the ultimate importance, the singular and overriding end which human beings ought to pursue.

== Plato and Aristotle ==
Plato, in The Republic argued that, "In the world of knowledge the idea of good appears last of all, and is seen...to be the universal author of all things beautiful and right". Silent contemplation was held to be the route to the appreciation of the Idea of the Good.

Aristotle, in his Nicomachean Ethics, accepted that the target of human activity, "must be the 'Good', that is, the supreme good.", but challenged Plato's Idea of the Good with the pragmatic question: "Will one who has had a vision of the Idea itself become thereby a better doctor or general?". However, arguably at least, Aristotle's concept of the unmoved mover owed much to Plato's Idea of the Good.

== Hellenic syncretism ==
Philo of Alexandria harmonized the Old Testament God with the unmoved mover and the Idea of the Good. Plotinus, the neoplatonic philosopher, built on Plato's Good for his concept of the supreme One, while Plutarch drew on Zoroastrianism to develop his eternal principle of good.

Augustine of Hippo in his early writings offered the summum bonum as the highest human goal, but was later to identify it as a feature of the Christian God in De natura boni (On the Nature of Good, c. 399). Augustine denies the positive existence of absolute evil, describing a world with God as the supreme good at the center, and defining different grades of evil as different stages of remoteness from that center.

== Middle Age ==
Thomas Aquinas identified the Summum Bonum with the Christian God. In his work The Summa Theologiae, Aquinas explains that God alone is good by His very essence, while everything else derives (takes part) its goodness from Him.

Aquinas' Compendium Theologiae stated that the supreme good coincides with the ultimate end (chapters 104 and 113) This is the natural desire and need for knowledge of causes and things in their essence, which leads to the First Cause and the vision of God in His being.

== Later developments ==
The summum bonum has continued to be a focus of attention in Western philosophy, secular and religious. Hegel replaced Plato's dialectical ascent to the Good by his own dialectical ascent to the Real.

G. E. Moore placed the highest good in personal relations and the contemplation of beauty—even if not all his followers in the Bloomsbury Group may have appreciated what Clive Bell called his "all-important distinction between 'Good on the whole' and 'Good as a whole'".

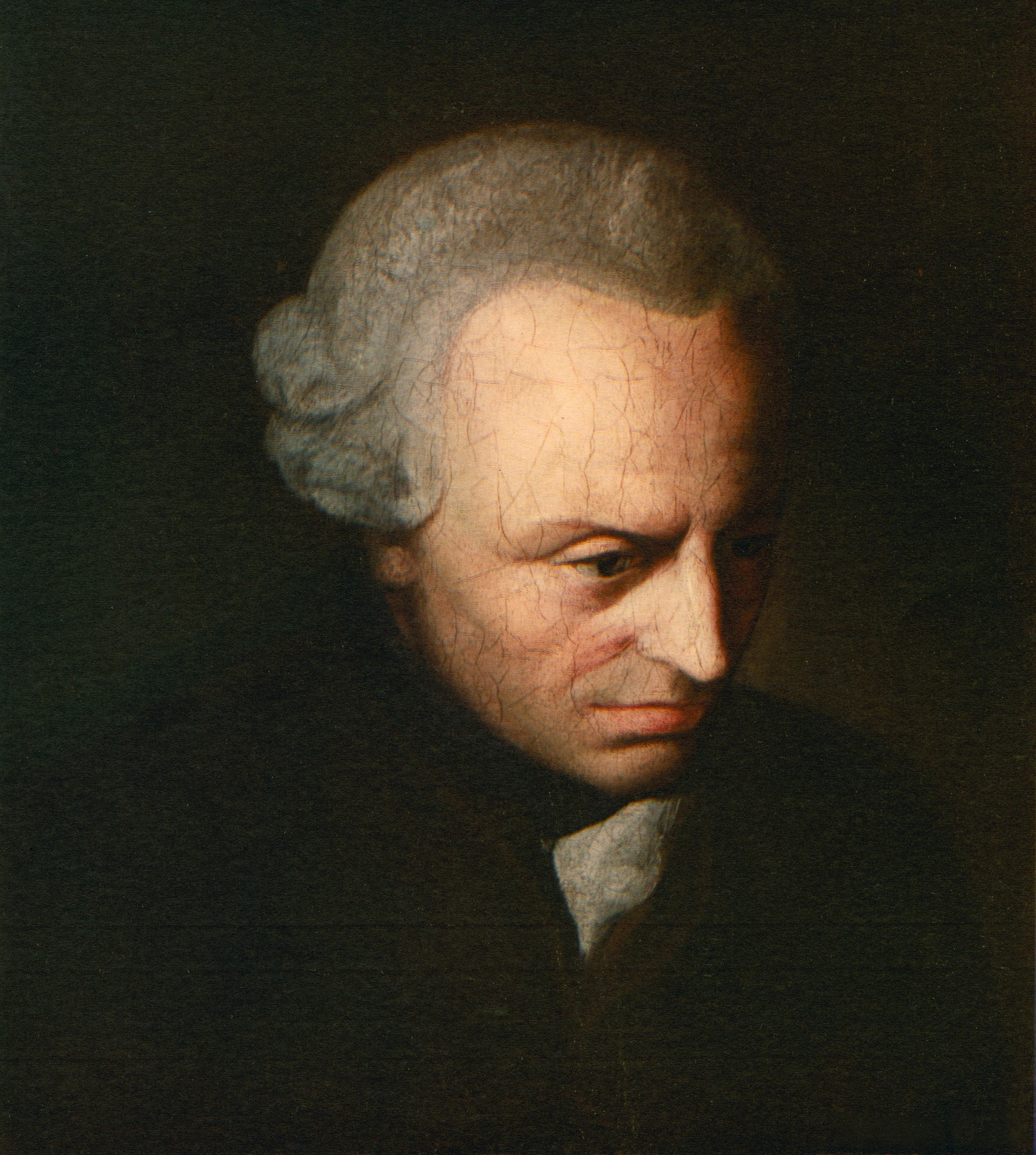
Immanuel Kant

The doctrine of the highest good maintained by Immanuel Kant can be seen as the fulfillment of all rational will. It is the supreme end of the will, meaning that beyond the attainment of a good will, which is moral excellence signified by abiding by the categorical imperative and pure practical reason, this is not reducible to hypothetical imperatives such as happiness. Furthermore, in virtue of the doctrine of the highest good, Kant postulates the existence of God and the eternal existence of rational agents, in order to reconcile three premises: (i) that agents are morally obligated to fully attain the highest good; (ii) that the object of an agent's obligation must be possible; (iii) that an agent's full realization of the highest good is not possible.

== Judgments ==
Judgments on the highest good have generally fallen into four categories:

- Utilitarianism, when the highest good is identified with the maximum possible psychological happiness for the maximum number of people;
- Eudaemonism or virtue ethics, when the highest good is identified with flourishing;
- Rational deontologism, when the highest good is identified with virtue or duty;
- Rational eudaemonism, or tempered deontologism, when both virtue and happiness are combined in the highest good.

== See also ==
- Common good
- Intrinsic value (ethics)
- Meaning of life
- Omnibenevolence
- Summum

== Notes ==
Attribution
