= Compendium Theologiae (Aquinas) =

Work by Thomas Aquinas

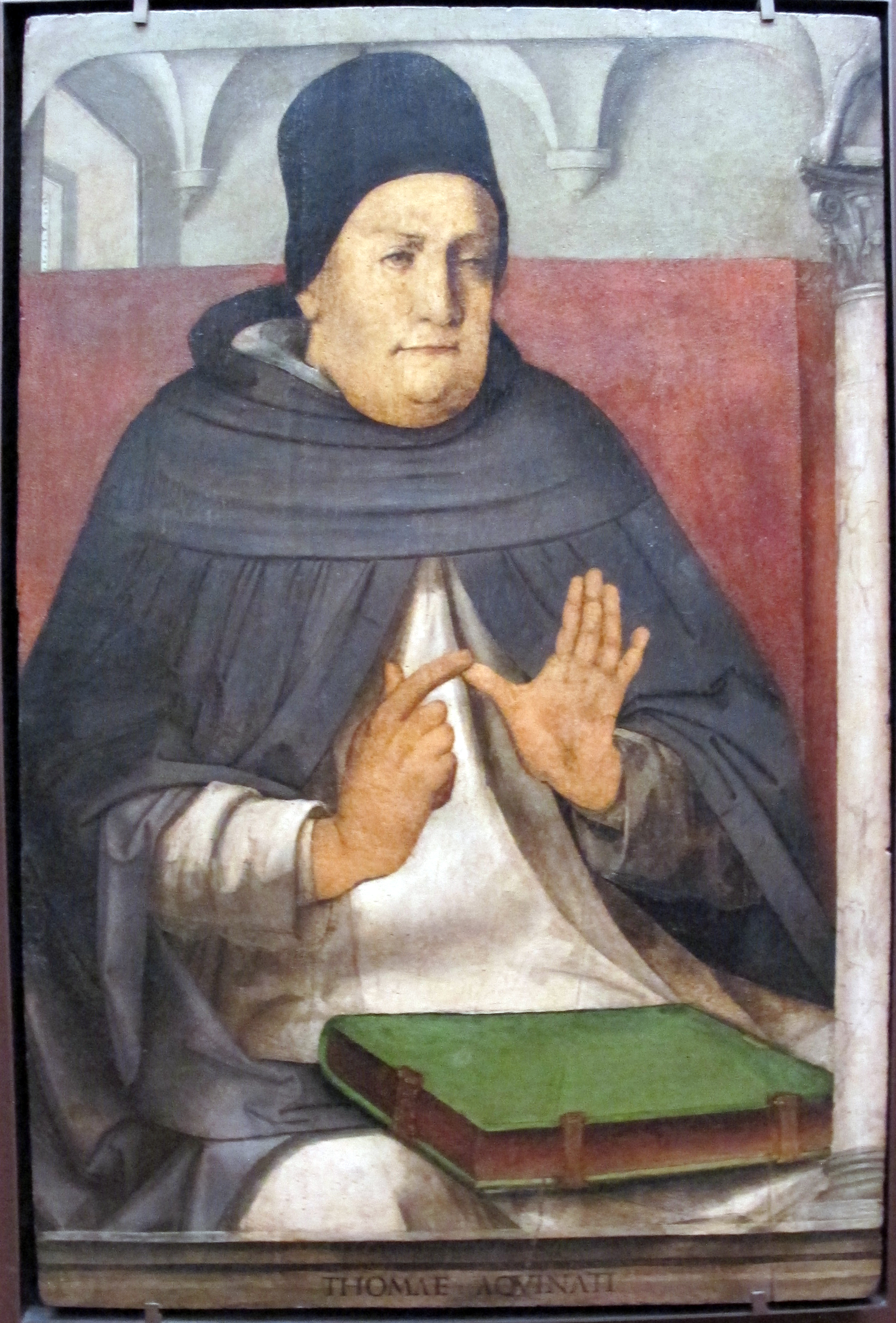
Painting of Thomas Aquinas by Pedro Berruguete and Justus van Gent, currently held at the Louvre (c. 1473).

Compendium Theologiae ad fratrem Reginaldum socium suum carissimum (lit. 'Compendium of theology, to brother Reginald, his most dear fellow'), also known as De fide et spe (lit. 'On faith and hope') is a short summa written by Catholic Saint Thomas Aquinas. It was left unfinished before the author's death.

== History ==
In the opening chapter, Aquinas affirms that the book's target audience are those searching for a convenient synopsis of Christian theology. The Compendium is a particularly mature work, written at the end of the theologian's career, and it can be seen as a brief assessment of the topics which the author understood as most important. The book was planned as "a summary of the principal teachings of Christian doctrine" and dedicated to brother Reginald of Piperno, a Dominican friar and companion of Thomas who had transcribed his notes and lectures and had asked for the work.

The chapters of the Compendium are usually no longer than a few paragraphs, as Aquinas aimed at brevity rather than the thorough style of the Summa Theologica. Even if the Doctor's death is usually taken as the cause for its incompletion, the first part seems to have been composed as early as in the 1265-1267 time span, soon after finishing his Summa contra Gentiles. Both works sometimes parallel each other in organization and topics, and the possibility of the Compendium being a reduced version of the former has been proposed by scholars.

Against the historical consensus, it has been recently proposed that Aquinas might have voluntarily abandoned the book due to a change in his teaching strategy.

== Content ==
The book was originally planned to follow a three-parts organization based on the theological virtues, in which the first section would be named after faith, the second after hope and the third after charity. Aquinas died before finishing the second part, which was left at its tenth chapter. The first part amounts to 246 chapters. "On faith" is based on the Apostles' Creed, while "On hope" follows the Lord's Prayer. "On charity" was planned to take the Commandments as an organizational ground.

The first part, being the only complete one, has been described as "the most important from the theological point of view". Subdivided in two treatises, the first one is devoted to the study of the Holy Trinity and the second to Christ's humanity. The first treatise takes from chapter 3 to chapter 184, while the second spans from 185 to 246.

Probably inspired in Augustine's Enchiridion, Aquinas justifies the organization of his work through his notion of salvation. According to the author, Jesus taught the doctrine of salvation in order to make it accessible to those "who are too occupied with work" through the practice of the theological virtues. By knowing the truths of the faith (faith), ordering the will towards its ultimate end (hope) and practicing justice (charity) one may expect to attain salvation.

Love cannot be rightly ordered unless the proper goal of our hope is established; nor can there be any hope if knowledge of the truth is lacking. Therefore the first thing necessary is faith, by which one may come to a knowledge of the truth. Secondly, hope is necessary, that one’s intention may be fixed on the right end. Thirdly, love is necessary, that one’s affections may be perfectly put in order.

Up to chapter 36 of the first part, Thomas discusses the doctrine of God's oneness and other aspects which are philosophically deductible, namely the divine necessity, eternity, immutability, simplicity, identity of being and essence, not belonging to any genus nor being a species, being incorporeal, omnipotent and infinite, containing every perfection in things in an eminent and unified way, not possessing accidents, not losing simplicity because of holding multiple names, being undefinable, intelligent, possessing a will and being identical to the divine essence.

== Translations ==
1. Vollert, Cyril (1958) [1947]. Compendium of Theology (Reprint ed.). St. Louis, Missouri: Herder Book Co.
2. Compendium of Theology by Richard J. Regan (2009) published by Oxford University Press, ISBN 978-0-1953-8530-4

== Bibliography ==
- Cessario, Romanus (2020). The godly image: Christian satisfaction in Aquinas. Sacra doctrina. Washington, DC: The Catholic University of America Press. ISBN 978-0-8132-3294-2.
- Eberl, Jason T. (2016). The Routledge guidebook to Aquinas' Summa Theologiae. Routledge guides to the great books. New York: Routledge. ISBN 978-1-315-72842-1.
- Porro, Pasquale (2016). Thomas Aquinas: a historical and philosophical profile. Washington, D.C: The Catholic University of America Press. ISBN 978-0-8132-2805-1.
- Weigel, Peter (2002). "Simplicity and Explanation in Aquinas' God". Proceedings of the Society for Medieval Logic and Metaphysics. 2: 77–86.
