= Summa contra Gentiles =

Work by Thomas Aquinas

The Summa contra Gentiles (Note: lit. 'Summary against the unbelievers'; also known as Liber de veritate catholicae fidei contra errores infidelium (lit. 'Book on the truth of the Catholic faith against the errors of the unbelievers')) is one of the best-known treatises by Thomas Aquinas, written as four books between 1259 and 1265.

Whereas the Summa Theologiæ was written to explain the Christian faith to theology students, the Summa contra Gentiles is more apologetic in tone. While the last of the four books (parts) of the S.C.G. deals with topics of revealed theology such as trinity, incarnation, and the sacraments, the first three books limit themselves to natural theology: arguments on the basis of reason, Thomas believes, will be understood also by those who do not believe in Christian revelation.

== Title ==
The conventional title Summa contra Gentiles, found in some of the earliest manuscripts, is sometimes given in the variant Summa contra Gentes. The title is taken from chapter I.2, where Thomas states his intention as the work's author:

I have set myself the task of making known, as far as my limited powers will allow, the truth that the Catholic faith professes, and of setting aside the errors that are opposed to it. To use the words of Hilary: 'I am aware that I owe this to God as the chief duty of my life, that my every word and sense may speak of Him' (De Trinitate I, 37).

A longer title is also given as Tractatus de fide catholica, contra errores infidelium, meaning "Tractate on the universal faith, against the errors of the pagans".

== Date and composition ==
The work was written over a period of several years, between 1259 and 1265.

In the spring of 1256 Thomas was appointed regent master in theology at Paris and one of his first works upon assuming this office was Contra impugnantes Dei cultum et religionem, defending the mendicant orders, which had come under attack by William of Saint-Amour. During his tenure from 1256 to 1259, Thomas wrote numerous works, and he was working on Summa contra Gentiles by the time he left Paris. From Aquinas's autograph, Torrell (1996) identified the first 53 chapters of Book I as having been written in Paris based on studies of the parchment and the ink used.

According to a tradition that can be traced to shortly after Thomas's death, the Summa contra Gentiles was written in response to a request, made in 1259, for a book that would help the Dominican missionaries in Spain to convert the Muslims and Jews there. The request was made by Raymond of Peñafort, a Dominican friar and advisor to James I of Aragon. Raymond had been active in the Christian defense against the Moors (Muslims) and Jews in the kingdom of Aragon since the 1240s. To this end, Raymond instituted the teaching of Arabic and Hebrew in several houses of the friars, and he also founded priories in Murcia (then still under Muslim rule) and in Tunis. Additionally he went to help establish the Church in the recently conquered island of Mallorca. Raymond's request to Thomas was transmitted by fellow Dominican Ramón Martí, one of eight friars appointed to make a study of oriental languages with the purpose of carrying on a mission to Jews and Moors.

The historicity of this account has been questioned in modern scholarship. Arguments adduced include the lack of an explicit dedication to Raymond, the evidence that substantial portions of book 1 were complete by mid-1259 (suggesting that Thomas started work on the book as early as 1257), and the suggestion that the work makes no effort to address tenets of Islam specifically.

Later in 1259, Thomas left Paris and returned to Naples, where he was appointed as general preacher by the provincial chapter of 29 September 1260. In September 1261 he was called to Orvieto as conventual lector responsible for the pastoral formation of the friars unable to attend a studium generale. It was in Orvieto that Thomas completed Summa contra Gentiles, which was followed by the Catena aurea and minor works produced for Pope Urban IV such as the liturgy for the newly created feast of Corpus Christi and the Contra errores graecorum.

Parts of the text have survived in Aquinas's autograph, kept in the Vatican Library as Lat. 9850. The manuscript includes fragments of books one and two, and large portions of book three.

== Contents ==
The Summa contra Gentiles consists of four books. The structure of St. Thomas's work is designed to proceed from general philosophical arguments for monotheism, to which Muslims and Jews are likely to consent even within their own respective religious traditions, before progressing to the discussion of specifically Christian doctrine.

- Book I begins with general questions of truth and natural reason, and from chapter 10 investigates the concept of a monotheistic God. Chapters 10 to 13 are concerned with the existence of God, followed by a detailed investigation of God's properties (chapters 14 to 102). When demonstrating a Truth about God which can be known through reason, St. Thomas gives multiple arguments, each proving the same Truth in a different way.
- Book II is dedicated to the Creation (viz. the physical universe, everything which exists).
- Book III discusses providence and the human condition, i.e. good and evil acts, human fate and intellect and the relation of created beings to the creator.
- Book IV is dedicated to discussing points of Christian doctrine which separate Nicaean Christianity from the other monotheistic religions, i.e. the doctrines of the Trinity, the Incarnation, the Sacraments and the Resurrection.

Books I–III cover truths that naturally are accessible to the human intellect while Book IV covers revealed truths for which natural reason is inadequate.

== Editions and translations ==
Giuseppe Ciantes (d. 1670), a leading Hebrew expert of his day and professor of theology and philosophy at the College of Saint Thomas in Rome, was appointed in 1640 by Pope Urban VIII to the mission of preaching to the Jews of Rome (Predicatore degli Ebrei) in order to promote their conversion. In the mid-1650s Ciantes wrote a "monumental bilingual edition of the first three Parts of Thomas Aquinas’ Summa contra Gentiles, which includes the original Latin text and a Hebrew translation prepared by Ciantes, assisted by Jewish converts, the Summa divi Thomae Aquinatis ordinis praedicatorum Contra Gentiles quam Hebraicè eloquitur…. Until the present this remains the only significant translation of a major Latin scholastic work in modern Hebrew."

The first modern edition of the work is the one by Ucceli (1878) re-published in 1918 as part of the Editio Leonina. Appendices to the first three books, based on the authograph, were edited as vols. 13 (1918, 3–61) and 14 (1926, 3–49) of the Leonine edition. The Leonine text was re-edited, with corrections, by P. Marc, C. Pera and P. Carmello and published with Marietti, Torino-Rome, in 1961.

Modern translations have been published in: English (1924, 1957), German (1937, 2001), Spanish (1968) and French (1993, 1999).

== Bibliography ==
- M. Asín y Palacios: “El averroísmo teológico de Santo Tomás de Aquino.” Homenaje á d. Francisco Codera en su jubilación del profesorado, estudios de erudición oriental. Zaragoza, 1904, pp. 271–331.
- R. R. Burns: Muslims, Christians, and Jews in the Crusader Kingdom of Valencia, Cambridge, 1984.
- J.-M. Casciaro: El diálogo teológico de Santo Tomás con musulmanes y judíos, Madrid, 1969.
- C. Chang, Engaging Unbelief: A Captivating Strategy from Augustine & Aquinas. Downers Grove, IL, 2000.
- L. Getino: La Summa contra gentiles y el Pugio fidei. Vergara, 1905.
- H. Hoping: Weisheit als Wissen des Ursprungs: Philosophie und Theologie in der "Summa contra gentiles" des Thomas von Aquin. Freiburg, 1997.
- Matthew Kostelecky: Thomas Aquinas’s Summa contra Gentiles: A Mirror of Human Nature. Leuven: Peeters, 2013. ISBN 978-90-429-2747-6
- A. Huerga: “Hipótesis sobre la génesis de la Summa contra gentiles y del Pugio fidei.” Angelicum 51 (1947), 533–57.
- T. Murphy: “The date and purpose of the contra Gentiles.” Heythrop Journal 10 (1969), 405–15.
- R. Schönberger: Thomas von Aquins “Summa contra Gentiles”. Darmstadt, 2001.
- John Tolan: "Thomas Aquinas: Summa contra gentiles", in D. Thomas et al., eds., Bibliographical History of Christian-Muslim Relations, vol. 4, Leiden: Brill, 2009–12.
- Jean-Pierre Torrell, OP: St. Thomas Aquinas: The Person and His Work: vol. 1. Washington, DC: Catholic University of America Press, 1996.
- J. Waltz: "Muhammad and the Muslims in St. Thomas Aquinas." Muslim World 66 (1976): 81–95.
- Summa contra gentiles (in Latin). Vol. 1. Naples. 1773 – via archive.org.
- The English Dominican Fathers (1923). The Summa contra gentiles of Saint Thomas Aquinas. Vol. First Book (literally translated from the Latest Leonine ed.). London: Burns Oates & Washbourne Ltd. – via archive.org. (with imprimatur of Edmund Canon Surmont, Westminster general vicar)
  - Second book
  - Fourth book
