= Quaestiones Disputatae de Veritate =

C. 1256 work by Thomas Aquinas

The Quaestiones Disputatae de Veritate (transl. Disputed Questions on Truth, henceforth QDV and sometimes spelled de Ueritate) by Thomas Aquinas is a collection of questions that are discussed in the disputation style of medieval scholasticism. It covers a variety of topics centering on the true, the good and man's search for them, but the questions range widely from the definition of truth to divine providence, conscience, the good and free decision.

== Authorship ==
The work was originally written circa 1256–1259, during Aquinas's first period in Paris.

It is one of the few of Aquinas's works for which the original dictation (for questions 2 to 22) still exists. This determination was made by A. Dondaine of the Leonine Commission in 1956, and is generally accepted by scholars.

Following the form of a disputatio, the QDV comprises a series of articles, each one being a lecture by Aquinas followed by "disputation" in response from his students. The whole was gathered from a series of sessions over three scholastic years. The fact that the number of articles averages out at some 80 per year, which is slightly more than the number of teaching days in the year (estimated by Bernardo Carlos Bazán at between 79 and 75 days), indicates that it was accumulated by Aquinas and his students at the rate of 1 article per day; although it is highly likely that it isn't a verbatim account of the actual day's disputatio, as the usual process involved some reorganization to form the final work, and also evidently some editing because in general the quality, length, and complexity of the work is above what one would expect of an unedited live discussion from students.

Evidence that the final work was compiled and edited fairly quickly after the actual disputatio comprises an early cataloguing in Aquinas's published works in 1293, an even earlier counterargument by William de la Mare against the theses of QDV starting in 1278, and quotations that match fragments from the QDV in Vincent of Beauvais's Speculum maius which dates to sometime before he died in 1264/65.

== Text and modern translations ==
The Leonine edition was published in 1925 and again in 1964.

It was translated into German by Edith Stein in two parts, questions 1–13 published in 1931 and questions 14–29 in 1932, which was republished in 1952 and 1955, and again in 1970. Martin Grabmann provided a preface to her translation. Although she had started a study of the QDV earlier, it was Erich Przywara that requested her to do the full translation, which she completed in 1929. By translating it into modern German philosophical terms, she made it more accessible, but at the same time incurred objections from people such as (for one) Laurentius Siemer, who had actually assisted her with the work, and criticized it in a letter to her in 1934 as a mistranslation that mis-framed Aquinas in phenomenological terms. Stein's reply to Siemer was that "No one knows better than I how little versed I am in Thomism". Her work on the translation of that and others in fact spurred her to then reinterpret phenomenology in Thomistic terms.

It was translated into Italian by Fernando Fiorentino (with notes and an introduction by Maurizio Mamiani) in 2005. V. O. Benetollo and R. Coggi edited a translation into Italian in 3 volumes that was published in 1993.

Francis-Xavier Putallaz published a French translation of question 1 in 1986, B. Jollès of questions 4 and 9 in 1983 and 1992, and Serge-Thomas Bonino of questions 12 and in 1989 and 1992. Bonino was reported in 2005 to be working on a translation of the whole into French.

=== English Translation ===
A complete translation into English was published by Henry Regnery Company in three volumes beginning in 1952, the first volume translated by R. W. Mulligan, the second by J. V. McGlynn, and the third by R. W. Schmidt.

== Structure and contents ==
The QDV comprises 253 articles, collected into 29 questions that are divided into two general groups. The first group is questions 1 to 20 that deal with truth and knowledge, the title for the entire work coming from the title of question 1. The second group is questions 21 to 29 that deal with the good and the appetite for the good. Serge-Thomas Bonino suggested that within each group a substructure exists such that it begins with God, then proceeds to the angels, them to man's structures, and finally to man's historical realizations.

The work is subdivided into 29 questions, as follows:

1. de Veritate - on Truth
2. de Scientia Dei - on the Knowledge of God
3. de Ideis - on Ideas
4. de Verbo - on the Divine Word and Names of Things
5. de Providentia - on Providence
6. de Praedestinatione - on Predestination
7. de Libro Vitae - on the Book of Life
8. de Cognitione Angelorum - on the Knowledge of the Angels
  This is one of the texts where Aquinas elaborates his theory of angelic knowledge, alongside the Summa Theologicae, Quodlibet 9, and the Scriptum super libros Sententiarum. This question covers a point that is not addressed in the latter Scriptum, namely how angels had what Augustine called "morning knowledge" without having direct access to God. Aquinas lays out Augustine's problem statement that angels had only natural powers and yet still had "morning knowledge" of Creation, which would require supernatural access, and answers it in two different ways, but does not choose which is the right answer. Either, says Aquinas, angels only gain "morning knowledge" after beatification, and have no inherent access to it as they are originally created, or their perception of God was not direct but a reflection of knowledge imbued into them, a copy of God's Word in the angel as it were.
9. de Communicatione Scientiae Angelicae per Illuminationes et Locutiones - on the Communication of the Angels through Illuminations and Locutions
10. de Mente in qua est Imago Trinitatis - on the Mind inasmuch as it is the Image of the Trinity
  This is a systematicization of what Aqunias initially addressed in the Scriptum super libros Sententiarum, which was to finally mature in the Summa Theologicae. In it, he discusses ideas such as a distinction between knowing that one has a soul versus knowing what that soul actually is, i.e. the general nature of souls. The former he further subdivides into knowing that one has a soul because of one's actions, because of an innate awareness of souls of themselves, by simply reasoning it out, and as a result of judging that it is simply true that one has a soul.
11. de Magistro - on Teaching
  This question provides insight into Aquinas's view of teaching itself. Aquinas presents an Augustinian view of teaching being divided into "interior" and "exterior" processes; that is modified by Aristotelian ideas. The former process is inventio, a means of teaching that is reserved to God, the principal teacher, a process of "natural reason [arriving] by itself at the knowledge of things previously unknown". The latter process is disciplina, a means of teaching available to Man, a process whereby a teacher attempts to convey to a student the same inventio processes that the teacher has undergone.
12. de Prophetia - on Prophesy
13. de Raptu - on Rapture, or religious ecstasy
14. de Fide - on Faith
15. de Ratione Superiori et Inferiori - on Superior and Inferior Reason
16. de Synderesi - on Synderesis
17. de Conscientia - on Conscience
18. de Cognitione Primi Hominis in Statu Innocentiae - on the Knowledge of the first man in the State of Innocence
19. de Cognitione Animae post Mortem - on the Knowledge of the Soul after death
20. de Scientia Animae Christi - on the Knowledge of the Soul of Christ
21. de Bono - on the Good
22. de Appetitu Boni et Voluntate - on the Striving for Good and the Will
23. de Voluntate Dei - on the Will of God
24. de Hominis Libero Arbitrio - on the Free Decision of Man
25. de Sensualitate - on Sensuality, or rather "the sensitive appetitive part of the soul"
26. de Passionibus - on the Emotions
27. de Gratia - on Grace
28. de Remissio Peccatorum - on the Remission of Sins
29. de Gratia Christi - On the Grace of Christ
