= De motu cordis, ad Magistrum Philippum =

Work by Thomas Aquinas

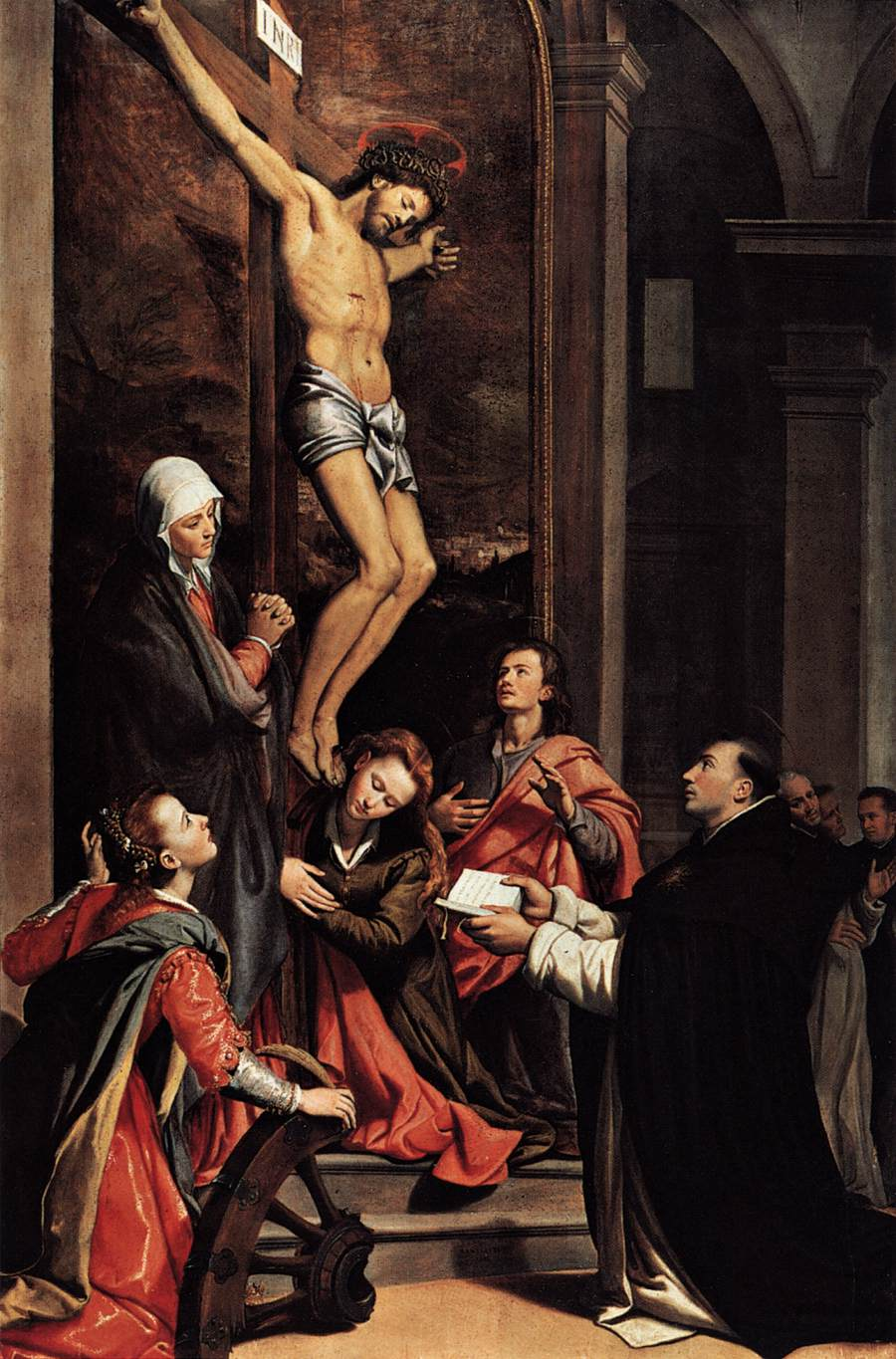
The Vision of Saint Thomas Aquinas by Santi di Tito (1593).

De motu cordis, ad Magistrum Philippum (lit. 'On the motion of the heart, to Master Philip') is a short work by Saint Thomas Aquinas. Addressed to a professor at Bologna and Naples, it is dated close to 1273 and is therefore one of the latest texts produced by Aquinas.

The work is particularly brief. In it, Aquinas attempts to give a philosophically sound explanation of the relationship between the soul and the human heart as an organ, mostly by making recourse to Aristotelian premises.

The work became popular enough to survive in 126 manuscripts and more than 30 printed editions.

== Context ==
The work is to be understood within the framework of medieval medicine. Aquinas wrote De motu cordis at the request of Philip of Castro Caeli, a professor of medicine at the University of Bologna and the University of Naples, with whom Thomas probably shared his last years at the latter city. Philip was born at a contiguous commune to Thomas' Roccasecca, and was also the addressee of his De mixtione elementorum.

Aquinas' teaching opposes to the theses put forward by Alfred of Sareshel in his 1217 "De motu cordis", in which the English author argued that the motion of the heart was unnatural, violent and produced by an extrinsic cause. Alfred's work was extensive and featured 16 chapters preceded by a prologue. The treatise is mostly devoted to physiology and medicine, and includes anatomical and cardiological propositions.

The epistle was also written amidst the controversy regarding Aristotelianism in High Medieval Europe. The work is significant in light of an objection leveled by Thomas' friend Bonaventure, who had contended that the human soul was to be substantially separable from the body in order to be immortal and able to ascend to God, what would therefore imply that the soul can be identified as an individual substance. This view was presented as incompatible with the Thomistic notion of the human composite (which describes the soul as the form of the body), in contrast to Bonaventure's view by which "[s]ince a soul that is capable of blessedness has to be immortal, it follows that the soul is united to a mortal body in such a manner that it can be separated from it. Hence it is not only a [perfecting] form, but also an individual substance". Contrary to Bonaventure's desire of proving the soul's self-sufficiency, Aquinas insists in affirming the unity of the human composite by taking the body as a completion of the human composite, and as the matter that serves as principle for the existence of the human soul.

== Doctrine ==
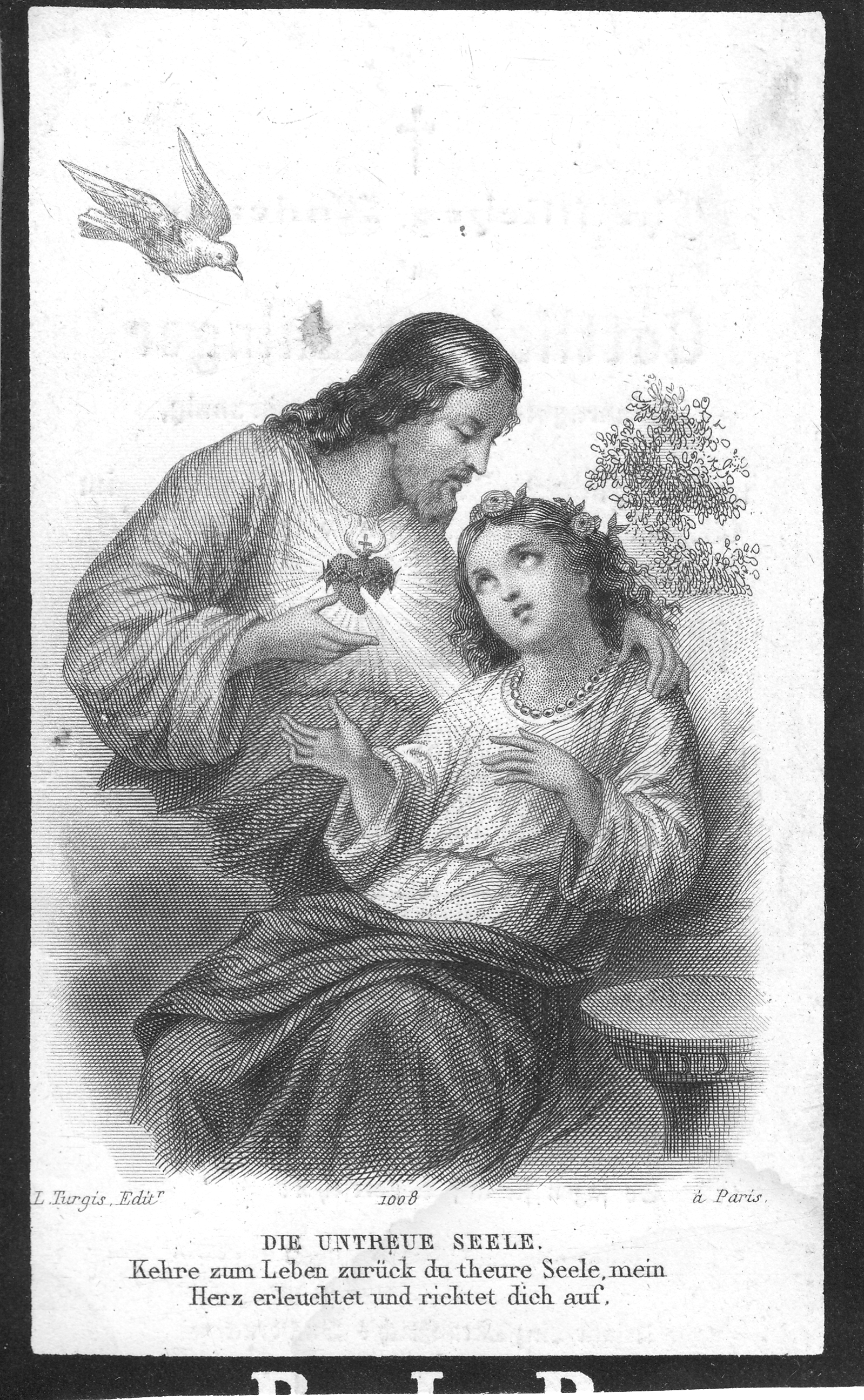
1879 depiction of the Sacred Heart of Jesus and a devout soul, on the rear side of an obituary.

The work is developed on the premise that the soul can be defined as "the form of living the body, and principally of the heart".

Thomas' starts by formulating the questions that the text will try to answer, namely "what moves the heart and exactly what kind of movement does it have". Throughout the indagation, Aquinas uses the Aristotelian definition of motion, which implies the actualization of potentiality.

The movements of the heart are classified either as a "push" or as a "pull", considering the mover as a terminus a quo of the former and as a terminus ad quem of the latter. Consequently, the saint studies if the principle of such motions could be extrinsic to the animal as a violent motion or not. This possibility is quickly dismissed.

to say that the motion of the heart is violent is irrational. For obviously if we do away with this motion, we end up doing away with the animal, but nothing violent preserves a nature. Indeed, the heart's motion must be most natural, since animal life is inseparably united to it.

The motion of the heart is therefore attributed as intrinsic to the animal itself, what is confirmed by the following reasoning.

In addition, when the motions in lower bodies are caused by a universal nature, such motions are not always present in them. Take, for example, the ebb and flow of ocean tides, which result from the motion of the moon and change in accord with it. But the motion of the heart is always present in the animal. Therefore, the heart's motion does not result from a separate cause but from an intrinsic principle.

Aquinas subtly inverts the terms of an analogy set forth by Maimonides, who had stated that "the heavens are to the universe as the heart to the animal, as their movement, if stopped for a moment, would cause the end of the body's life" by saying that

Now the most subtle form on earth is the soul, which is most like the principle of the motion of the heavens. Thus, the motion that results from the soul is most like the motion of the heavens. In other words, the heart moves in the animal as the heavenly bodies move in the cosmos.

By this statement, the author not only exalts the nobility of the human soul, but also presents the then-widespread view according to which humans can be understood as microcosms. As Aquinas puts it, the soul functions as a mover, what directly implies its substantial unity with the body in which the heart serves as an intermediate organ.

[A] fully developed animal, one that is capable of moving itself, is more like the whole universe than anything else. This is why man, who is the most fully developed of animals, is called by some a microcosm. Now in the universe the first motion is local motion, which causes alteration and the other motions. So we more clearly see in animals that local motion is the principle of alteration, and not the contrary. As the Philosopher says in the Physics: "For all natural things, to move is to live".

The cause of the motion, however, is not the nutritive, the sensitive nor the intellectual soul, as the motion does not produce any of the former's effects nor moves appetitively like the latter two. Aquinas also denies that the heart is moved by heat, despite affirming that the heart produces heat by its moving. The possibility of an intentional moving is also discarded, as animals possess motion in their hearts despite not holding intentionality. The movement must be understood as a natural one.

Nevertheless, the principle of every human action is natural. For although the conclusions of the theoretical and practical sciences are not naturally known, but rather are discovered through reasoning, nevertheless the first indemonstrable principles are naturally known, and from them we come to know other things. In the same way, the desire for the ultimate goal, happiness, is natural to humans, as is the aversion toward unhappiness. Thus, the desire for things other than what constitute happiness is not natural. The desire for these other things proceeds from the desire of the ultimate goal. For the goal in acts of desire is just like the indemonstrable principles in acts of the intellect, as is said in the second book of Physics. And so even though the movements of all the other parts of the body are caused by the heart, as the Philosopher proves in On the Motion of Animals, these movements can still be voluntary, while the first movement, that of the heart, is natural.

Developing on the cosmic analogy, Aquinas states that the motion of the heart is the "first motion" of the animal, what implies that the heart is analogous the cosmos' Unmoved mover at the body. The author teaches that "thus, the motion of the heart is a natural result of the soul, the form of the living body and principally of the heart".

an upward motion is natural to fire as a result of its form, and hence that what generates fire, giving it its form, is essentially a place-to-place mover...[I]nsofar as the animal has a particular kind of form, namely the soul, nothing prohibits it from having a natural motion as a result of that form. And the cause responsible for this motion would be what gives the form.

By saying that the soul is "principally" the form of the heart, Aquinas does not contradict his teaching regarding the full presence of the soul in the whole body, put forward in his Summa Theologica. This is solved by the cosmic analogy. The Unmoved mover's omnipresence does not imply being as present in one place as in another in an unqualified sense but according to the mode of being of each entity (because the more actual something is, the more it partakes in being and therefore resembles and holds the divine presence). A cause that imparts causality to all other causes is therefore "more strongly the cause of all motions than are the individual moving causes themselves". This implies that, within the body, the heart causes all other movements as a Prime mover, but, within the human composite, "the heart receives its natural motion from the soul as the cosmos is moved by the First Mover".

== See also ==
- Commentary on the Book of Causes (Aquinas)
- Hypostatic union
- Immaculate Heart of Mary
- Sacred Heart

== Bibliography ==
- Friesen, Corin A. (2018). Principaliter Cordis: Personhood and the primacy of the heart in Aquinas's De motu cordis (Senior thesis). Northeast Catholic College.
- Jones, Jordan P. (2020). The function of the human heart as it relates to the soul according to the thought of Thomas Aquinas (Master of Arts thesis). Saint Louis University.
- Lázaro, Nicolás A. (April 2018). De motu cordis: La posición del Aquinate en torno a la realidad del corazón. La realidad del corazón en el pensamiento medieval (in Spanish).
