= Reginald of Piperno =

Italian Dominican, theologian and companion of Thomas Aquinas

Reginald of Piperno (or Reginald of Priverno) was an Italian Dominican theologian and the companion of Thomas Aquinas.

== Biography ==
Reginald was born at Piperno about 1230. Since 1927 this town of the Lazio region in central Italy is Priverno. He entered the Dominican Order at Naples. Thomas Aquinas chose him as his socius and confessor at Rome about 1265. From that time Reginald was Aquinas's constant and intimate companion.

By November 1268 Aquinas had completed his tenure at the Santa Sabina studium provinciale, the forerunner of the studium generale at Santa Maria sopra Minerva which would be transformed in the 16th century into the College of Saint Thomas (Latin: Collegium Divi Thomæ), and then in the 20th century into the Pontifical University of Saint Thomas Aquinas, Angelicum. Reginald was with Aquinas and Nicholas Brunacci (1240-1322), Aquinas' student from Santa Sabina, as they left Viterbo on their way to Paris to begin the academic year.

Aquinas dedicated several of his works to Reginald.

In 1272 Reginald began to teach with Aquinas at Naples. He attended at Aquinas's death-bed, received his general confession, and pronounced the funeral oration in 1274. He returned to Naples, and probably succeeded to the chair of his master. He died about 1290.

Reginald's testimony is continually cited in the process of Aquinas's canonization.

== Writings ==
Reginald collected all the works of Aquinas. Four of the Opuscula ('small works'), Postilla super Joannem (corrected by St. Thomas), Postillae super Epistolas S. Pauli, Postilla super Tres Nocturnos Psalterii and Lectura super Primum de Anima, are reports he made of lectures delivered by Aquinas, either taken down during the lecture or afterwards written out from memory.

Reginald is also considered by some as the compiler of the Supplement to the Summa Theologiae. This supplement was meant to afford completion to the unfinished Summa Theologiae, and it was composed out of book IV of Aquinas's Commentary to the Sentences of Peter Lombard.

The funeral discourse published at Bologna in 1529 under the name of Reginald is the work of the Italian humanist Joannes Antonius Flaminius.
