= Editio Leonina =

Edition of the works of Thomas Aquinas

The Editio Leonina or Leonine Edition is the edition of the works of Saint Thomas Aquinas originally sponsored by Pope Leo XIII in 1879.

The Leonine Commission (Commissio leonina) is the group of scholars working on the ongoing project of critically editing the works of Aquinas. The first superintendent of the commission was Tommaso Maria Zigliara, professor and rector of the Collegium Divi Thomae de Urbe (the future Pontifical University of Saint Thomas Aquinas). Its current seat is in Paris, rue de la Glacière and it is currently (as of 2015) chaired by friar Adriano Oliva. The editions are published with editions du Cerf, the historical Dominican publishing house in France founded in 1929 at the request of Pope Pius XI.

Aquinas' main work, the Summa Theologiae, was edited in nine volumes (tt.IV–XII) during 1888–1906. As of 2014, the Editio Leonina comprises 39 volumes, representing about half of the entire scope of the project.

== History ==
The Leonine Commission was composed of Dominicans, while the Franciscans were entrusted with the task of publishing the complete works of St. Bonaventure, a friend of Aquinas.

Between 1888 and 1930 the Leonine Commission published the eight volumes of the Summa Theologiae and the three volumes of the Summa contra Gentiles.

After a period of apparent inactivity, but of fruitful silent research, the Commission became active again in 1952, under the impetus of the General Chapter of the Dominican Order (Washington, 1949) and the Master of the Order, Emmanuel Suarez. Under the presidency of Antoine Dondaine (1952) and Pierre-Marie de Contenson_{fr} (1964), the Leonine Commission was given a new impetus that resulted in the publication of more than twenty folio volumes at close intervals.

This was followed by commentaries on Job (1965) and on Isaiah (H.-F. Dondaine and L. Reid, 1974). This highly significant choice emphasized the quality of Thomas Aquinas's Magister in sacra pagina, in which he commented on the Bible throughout his life as a teacher (in addition to Job and Isaiah, Jeremiah, the Lamentations and the Psalms for the Old Testament, and, for the New, Matthew and John, all of Saint Paul and, in another way, the four Gospels in the form of an enormous collection of Patristic quotations in the Golden Chain).

While these works consisted of ordinary questions discussed privately by the teacher with his bachelor and his disciples, the quodlibeta gave rise to a public dispute that was held twice a year (in Advent and Lent), in front of the whole university gathered for the occasion. The two volumes of the Quodlibeta were published in 1996 by R.-A. Gauthier.

Some thirty shorter works, known as Opuscula, were published in four volumes between 1967 and 1979 by H.-F. Dondaine. Some are quite long, such as the Compendium Theologiae; others, more modest, are no less famous and important, such as De unitate intellectus, De aeternitate mundi or Contra errores Graecorum. Reflecting the issues debated at the time, they are a valuable testimony to discover the importance of Aquinas in the philosophical and theological reality of his time. We have another testimony in the form of commentaries on the works of Aristotle, which was then making its definitive entry into the West. Most of these editions are due to the tireless work of R.-A. Gauthier: the Sententia libri Ethicorum (2 vols., in 1969), the Tabula libri Ethicorum (1971), the Sententia libri De anima, librorumque de sensu et De memoria (2 vols., in 1984), the Expositio libri Peryermenias and the Expositio libri Posteriorum [Analyticorum] (2 vols., in 1989); however, the Sentencia libri Politicorum was published by H.-F. Dondaine and L.-J. Bataillon (1971). As for the commentaries by Boethius, the Leonine Edition published in 1992 the Super Boetium De Trinitale (P.-M. Gils) and the Expositio libri De Ebdomadibus (Louis Jacques Bataillon and C. Grassi).

Important works such as the Scriptum super Libros Quattuor Sententiarum by Peter Lombard, the commentaries on Physics, on Metaphysics and many other works by Aristotle, the Commentaries on Saint John, on Saint Matthew, on Saint Paul, on The Divine Names by Pseudo-Dionysius the Areopagite, the Golden Chain, as of 2002 they were still being edited and will no doubt continue to be for a long time. Compared to normal printed editions, which are often very deficient, they offer above all the guarantee of access to Thomas's true text. For example, before the arrival of the Leonine Edition of De veritate, the text of current editions contained no less than ten thousand more or less seriously erroneous variants compared to the original. To neglect this not only means misunderstanding the true text; it means ignoring the author's intention and his very thought.

A second interest offered by these volumes lies in the preface (more or less long depending on their importance) that precedes each of the published texts, in which the researchers explained and justified their work of restitution of the original text. In these introductions, a multitude of indications of textual criticism are also presented (showing the way Thomas worked); dates and places of composition; the influence of contemporaries (Alexander of Hales, Bonaventure, Albert the Great...); the most remote sources, Arabic, Greek and Latin, patristic or simply philosophical, that Thomas used and the way in which he adapted them to integrate them into his synthesis.

Thus Aquinas was an author dedicated to a path of constant growth, always concerned with adding to an already considerable body of documentation, who didn't hesitate to correct himself and change his previous opinions. These prefaces, which are monuments of erudition, have been supplemented by more specialized studies - such as that of P.-M. Gilson S. Thomas écrivain, which, through the study of the saint's autographs, sheds new light on his person - and have considerably renewed the knowledge we had of Thomas Aquinas and his work.

== Bibliography ==
- t.I*-1. Expositio libri Peryermenias, editio altera retractata, [ed. R.-A. Gauthier ]. Roma - Paris,1989.
- t.I*-2. Expositio libri Posteriorum, [ed. R.-A. Gauthier]. Roma - Paris, 1989.
- t.II. Commentaria in octo libros Physicorum Aristotelis. Roma, 1884.
- t.III. In libros Aristotelis De caelo et mundo expositio, In libros Aristotelis Meteorologicorum expositio., Roma, 1886.
- t.IV–XII. Summa Theologiae (with the commentaries by Thomas Cajetan). Roma, 1888–1906.
- t.XIII-XV. Summa contra Gentiles. Roma, 1918–1930.
- t.XXI. Quaestiones disputatae De potentia Dei, [ed. R.-A. Gauthier]. [forthcoming].
- t.XXII.1-3. Quaestiones disputatae De veritate, [ed. A. Dondaine]. Ed. Leon., Roma: Editori di san Tommaso, 1972-1976.
- t.XXIII. Quaestiones disputatae De malo, [ed. P.-M. Gils]. Roma - Paris 1982.
- t.XXIV-1 Quaestiones disputatae De anima, ed. B.-C. Bazán. Roma - Paris, 1996.
- t.XXIV-2, Quaestiones disputatae De spiritualibus creaturis, ed. J. COS. Roma - Paris, 2000.
- t.XXV.1-2. Quaestiones de quolibet, [ed. R.-A. Gauthier], 1996.
- t.XXVI. Expositio super Iob ad litteram, [ed. A. Dondaine]. Romae [Ad Sanctae Sabinae], 1965.
- t.XXVIII. Expositio super Isaiam ad literam, [ed. H.F. Dondaine et L. Reid]. Romae [Ad Sanctae Sabinae]: Editori di San Tommaso, 1974.
- t.XL. Opuscula, vol.I. Romae [Ad Sanctae Sabinae], 1969.
- t.XLI, Opuscula, vol.II. Romae [Ad Sanctae Sabinae], 1970.
- t.XLII Opuscula, vol.III. Roma: Editori di San Tommaso, 1979.
- t.XLIII Opuscula, vol.IV. Roma: Editori di san Tommaso, 1976.
- t.XLVI. Sentencia libri Metaphysice, ed. J.P. Reilly. (in preparation)
- t.XLV-1. Sentencia libri De anima, [ed. R.-A. Gauthier]. Roma - Paris, 1984.
- t.XLV-2. De memoria et reminiscencia, in Sentencia libri De sensu et sensato cuius secundus tractatus est De memoria et reminiscencia..., [ed. R.-A. Gauthier]. Roma - Paris, 1985.
- t.XLVII.1-2. Sententia libri Ethicorum, [ed. R.-A. Gauthier]. Romae [Ad Sanctae Sabinae], 1969.
- t.XLVIII. Sententia libri Politicorum, [edd H.F. Dondaine et L-J. Bataillon]. Romae [Ad Sanctae Sabinae], 1971, p.A.69-A.205.
- t.XLVIII. Tabula libri Ethicorum, [ed. R.-A. Gauthier]. Romae [Ad Sanctae Sabinae], 1971, p.B.63-B.158.
- t.L. Expositio libri Boetii De ebdomadibus, [edd L-J. Bataillon et C.A. Grassi]. Super Boetium De Trinitate, [ed. P.-M.J. Gils]. Roma - Paris, 1992.

== See also ==
- List of works by Thomas Aquinas
