= Contra Errores Graecorum =

1263 treatise by Thomas Aquinas written to help Urban IV resolve the Great Schism

Contra errores Graecorum, ad Urbanum IV Pontificem Maximum (Against the Errors of the Greeks, to Pope Urban IV) is a short treatise (an "opusculum") written in 1263 by Roman Catholic theologian Saint Thomas Aquinas as a contribution to Pope Urban's efforts at reunion with the Eastern Church. Aquinas wrote the treatise in 1263 while he was papal theologian and conventual lector in the Dominican studium at Orvieto after his first regency as professor of theology at the University of Paris which ended in 1259 and before he took up his duties in 1265 reforming the Dominican studium at Santa Sabina, the forerunner of the Pontifical University of Saint Thomas Aquinas, Angelicum, in Rome.

Aquinas died on his way to participate in the 1274 Second Council of Lyons, to which he had been invited, but this treatise, which he had written eleven years before and not for the use of this Council, was influential at the Council.

The work is listed in the socalled Prague Catalog of Aquinas' writings and its content is closely similar to the one presented in Naples by Bartholomew of Capua at the Aquinas' canonization process.

== Contents ==
The title of the treatise was not given by Aquinas himself, and it contains nothing that is directed against the doctrine of the Eastern Orthodox Church, but only, in the view of theologian Yves Congar, a defence of Catholic doctrine against Eastern misunderstandings.

The 72 chapters of the work are each of the length of a paragraph in a modern book. In it Aquinas presents the teaching of the Greek Church Fathers as in harmony with that of the Latin Church. The book is arranged in two parts, the first of 32 chapters and the second of 40, each part preceded by a prologue, and the work as a whole concluded with an epilogue. All the first part and 31 of the 40 chapters of the second concern pneumatology (doctrine on the Holy Spirit). Of the final 9 chapters, 7 deal with the position of the Roman Pontiff, and the last two with the use of leavened bread in the Eucharist and with purgatory. In all of these Aquinas quoted expressions by Fathers of the Greek Church in support of the teaching propounded by the Latin Church.

In his treatise, Aquinas "demonstrated that there was a theological harmony between the Greek Church Fathers and the Latin Church". He pointed out that one source of misunderstandings between Greeks and Latins was the difficulty of finding appropriate words in each language with which to translate technical theological terms used in the other:

Many things which sound well enough in Greek do not perhaps, sound well in Latin. Hence, Latins and Greeks professing the same faith do so using different words. For among the Greeks it is said, correctly, and in a Catholic way, that the Father, Son and Holy Spirit are three hypostases. But with the Latins it does not sound right to say that there are three substantiae, even though on a purely verbal basis the term hypostasis in Greek means the same as the term substantia in Latin. The fact is, substantia in Latin is more frequently used to signify essence. And both we and the Greeks hold that in God there is but one essence. So where the Greeks speak of three hypostases, we Latins speak of three personae, as Augustine in the seventh book on the Trinity also teaches. And, doubtless, there are many similar instances.
It is, therefore, the task of the good translator, when translating material dealing with the Catholic faith, to preserve the meaning, but to adapt the mode of expression so that it is in harmony with the idiom of the language into which he is translating. For obviously, when anything spoken in a literary fashion in Latin is explained in common parlance, the explanation will be inept if it is simply word for word. All the more so, when anything expressed in one language is translated merely word for word into another, it will be no surprise if perplexity concerning the meaning of the original sometimes occurs.

== Problem of the sources ==
The apologetic impact of the work is limited, due to the fact that Thomas bases himself on a collection of texts compiled by Nicholas of Crotone, which contains doubtful attributions and personal glosses of the compiler that bent the text in direction of the Latin theology. According to Jean-Pierre Torell, "on four specific questions concerning the procession a filio, the primacy of the pope, the Eucharistic celebration with unleavened bread, and purgatory, Thomas is clearly forced to rely more on the texts that are closer to Latin theology, when these are in fact glosses foreign to the Fathers."

== See also ==
- Filioque
- East-West Schism
- Eastern Orthodox – Roman Catholic theological differences
- Eastern Orthodox – Roman Catholic ecclesiastical differences
