= De aeternitate mundi, contra murmurantes =

Treatise by Thomas Aquinas

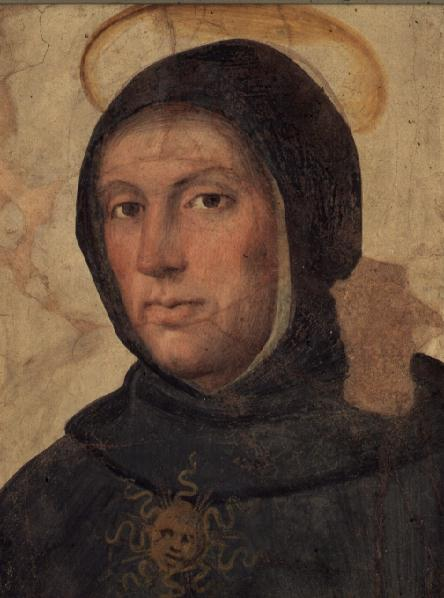
Portrait of Thomas Aquinas by Fra Bartolomeo (1472–1517).

De aeternitate mundi, contra murmurantes (lit. 'On the eternity of the world, against the murmurers') is a treatise by the Doctor of the Catholic Church Saint Thomas Aquinas regarding the possibility of an ever-existing universe.

The work is usually dated around 1270 and is particularly brief. Aquinas uses the medieval definition of world, which refers to "the totality of creatures". Despite acknowledging the denial of an eternal universe by Catholic doctrine, the saint attempts to study the logical coherence of such a proposition from a philosophical point of view.

== Context ==
De aeternitate mundi was written in the context of a philosophical confrontation between Christian Platonists and Aristotelians. The former, who followed Plato's system as the most appropriate for theological interpretation, criticised Aristotle's notion of an eternal universe, which was perpetually intervened by the Unmoved Mover, on the grounds of its opposition to the Catholic doctrine of Creation. After centuries of Platonic dominance, the growing popularization of Aristotle's works thanks to Arabic translations had caused a fierce controversy, as Aristotelianism implied a worldview change under an allegedly more scientific approach which was seen as conflicting with the established dogma.

The conflict was deepened by the widespread reading of Averroist commentaries on the subject, which placed a particular emphasis on the eternal nature of the universe and therefore its apparent incompatibility with Christian teaching. A critical point was finally reached when a list of 219 propositions, including the eternity of the world, was condemned in 1277 (three years after Aquinas' death) by the bishop of Paris Étienne Tempier and forbidden from being taught in universities.

== Doctrine ==
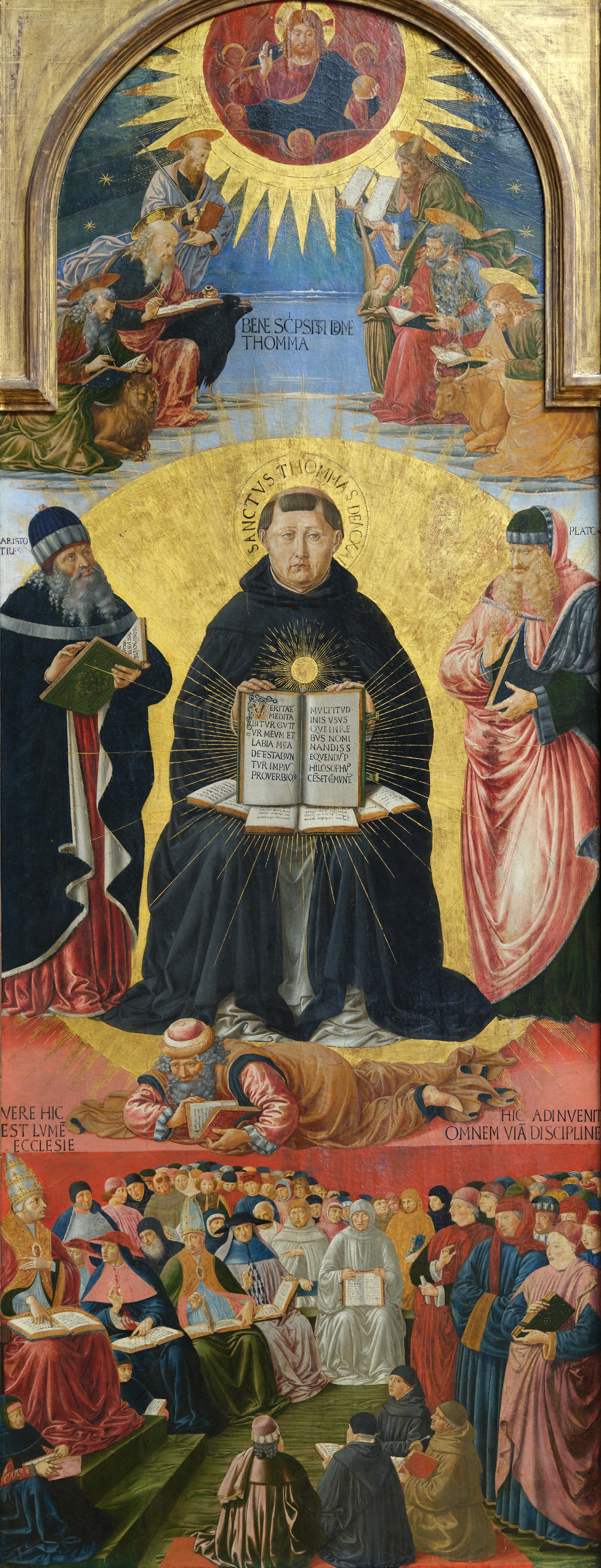
Triumph of Thomas Aquinas by Benozzo Gozzoli (c. 1470). Aristotle and Plato are depicted left and right to Aquinas, while Averroes is shown defeated in the floor.

Aside from the main topic of the work, Aquinas reviews an ancient debate regarding whether time could be said to have existed and flowed before Creation. A topic already discussed by Origen of Alexandria and Augustine of Hippo, the philosopher follows the latter in affirming that time is a property to be adscribed to created things and therefore could not be applied to the divine preexistence to the universe. There was therefore no divine inactivity before the act of Creation, but rather an eternal way of existence which can only be attributed to God.

The theologian develops on this view by using the Aristotelian notion of time. Time is understood to be a measure of change and thus, before Creation, there was no matter to be subjected to change, there was no time, properly speaking, before Creation.

Regarding the possibility of the existence of an eternal universe, Aquinas' reasoning begins by acknowledging that the world had indeed begun to exist at a specific moment according to the Catholic faith, but the question regarding the logical possibility of a created eternal universe nevertheless remained open. The theologian proceeds to inquire on whether the premises of Creation and eternal existence imply contradiction or not as a potential refutation to the idea.

Thomas follows Aristotelian metaphysics in stating that Creation implies "producing a whole substance of a thing". Therefore, the incompatibility of being created in a whole substance by God and not having a beginning in time is subsequently considered.

[N]o cause instantaneously producing its effect necessarily precedes the effect in time. God, however, is a cause that produces effects not through motion but instantaneously. Therefore, it is not necessary that he precede his effects in time. (…) Further, if, granted a cause, its effect does not immediately exist as well, this can only be because something complementary to that cause is lacking: the complete cause and the thing caused are simultaneous. God, however, never lacks any kind of complementary cause in order to produce an effect. Therefore, at any instant at which God exists, so too can his effects, and thus God need not precede his effects in time. (…) Thus it is clear that there is no contradiction in saying that something made by God has always existed.

Aquinas distinguishes Creation from beginning in the fact the latter is a temporal category that can be adscribed exclusively to beings which exist in time, while the former implies a relationship between a Creator and a created entity in a metaphysical and ontological dependence. The act of Creation is therefore not a single event in time, but it must be said that "God continuously creates the world" as Creation extends throughout the entire period in which an entity exists and the world "could not even exist for a moment without its Creator". As the relation between the Creator and the world does not depend on time (considering the fact God needs not to precede his effects in time), there appears to be no apparent contradiction on the notion of a created and ever-existing universe even if Revelation denies such a doctrine and must therefore not be followed.

The work finishes with a number of authoritative quotations which support the author's views, including fragments from Augustine of Hippo, John Damascene, Hugh of Saint Victor and Severinus Boethius. Aquinas considers a last objection regarding the existence of infinite souls in an eternal universe and concludes the treatise by dismissing other arguments either as too weak or as already answered.

== Legacy ==
It has been pointed out that Aquinas' intervention played a fundamental role in ending the crisis and arriving at a consensus for future Christian theologians. Nevertheless, his reasoning was still fiercely resisted in the following years, to the point the 1277 condemnations (which included the view that the debate on the eternity of the world could not be philosophically settled, what Aquinas taught) were enforced after his death and not lifted until his canonization in 1323.

== See also ==
- Cosmological argument
- Five Ways (Aquinas)
- The Incoherence of the Philosophers, by Al-Ghazali.
- Why is there anything at all?

== Bibliography ==
- Cavallazzi Sánchez, Alejandro (2012). "Un comentario a la estructura lógica del opúsculo De aeternitate mundi contra murmurantes de Tomás de Aquino" (PDF). Revista de Filosofía Open Insight (in Spanish). 3 (4): 113–141. doi:10.23924/oi.v3i4.54. ISSN 2007-2406.
- Pabjan, Tadeusz (2020-06-30). "The Problem of the Beginning of the World in the Interpretation of Saint Thomas Aquinas". The Person and the Challenges. The Journal of Theology, Education, Canon Law and Social Studies Inspired by Pope John Paul II. 10 (1): 5–15. doi:10.15633/pch.3608. ISSN 2391-6559.
