= List of people associated with the Pontifical University of St. Thomas Aquinas =

This is a partial list of alumni, faculty and staff associated with the Pontifical University of St. Thomas Aquinas (Angelicum) in Rome, Italy.

== Medieval origin: 1222 The Santa Sabina Studium Conventuale ==
- Jacek Odrowąż, 1220, among the first to enter the convent and studium at Santa Sabina before its official donation to the Dominican Order by Pope Honorius III on 5 June, in 1222.
- Czesław Odrowąż (c. 1184 – c. 1242), 1220, among the first to enter the convent and studium at Santa Sabina.
- Herman of Germany, 1220, among the first to enter the convent and studium at Santa Sabina.
- Heinrich von Mähren (Henry of Moravia), 1220, among the first to enter the convent and studium at Santa Sabina
- Giovanni Colonna (1206 c. – 1290) studied theology and philosophy at the Santa Sabina studium making solemn vows c. 1228. Colonna, the nephew of Cardinal Giovanni Colonna di Carbognano Cardinal Deacon of Santi Cosma e Damiano, became Archbishop of Messina in 1255.
- Annibaldo degli Annibaldi (1220c. – 1272c.). Before 1245 entered the Order at Santa Sabina and completed his initial studies in the studium there. Third Master of the Sacred Palace after Dominic and Bartolomeo di Breganze.

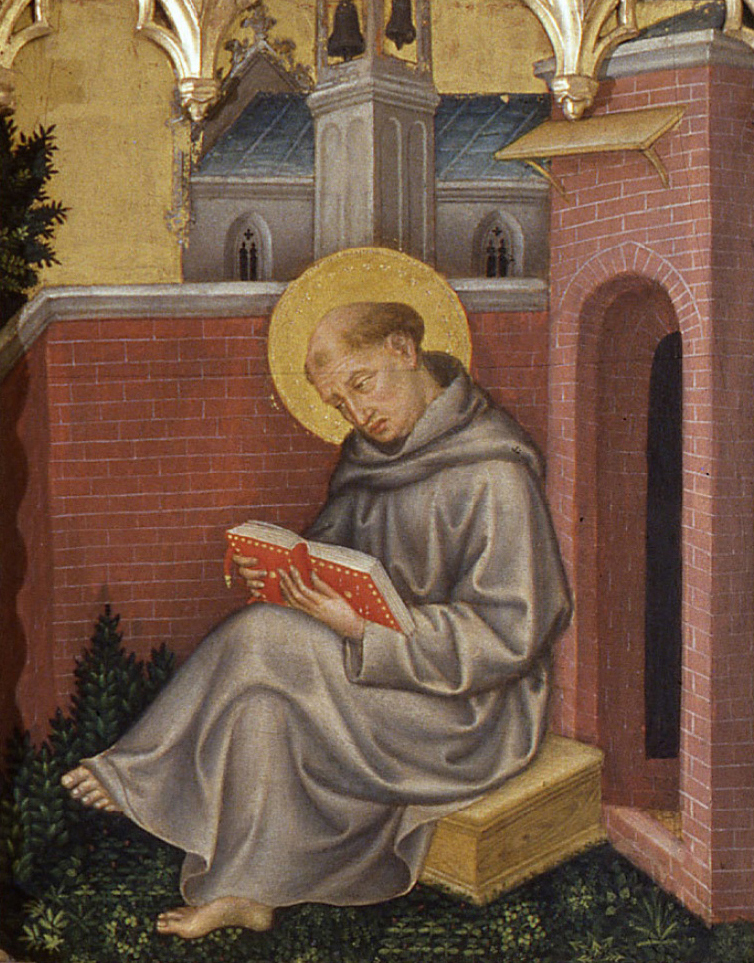
Angelicum patron, Doctor Angelicus Thomas Aquinas, by Gentile da Fabriano c. 1400

== 1265 Studium Provinciale ==
- Thomas Aquinas. 1265 to 1268 regent master at the Santa Sabina studium.
- Tommasello da Perugia. 1265 c. studied with Aquinas at the Santa Sabina studium provinciale. Blessed
- Nicholas Brunacci [1240–1322]. 1265 c. studied with Aquinas at the Santa Sabina studium and later at Paris. In November 1268 he accompanied Aquinas and his associate and secretary Reginald of Piperno from Viterbo to Paris to begin the academic year.
- Jacob of Ranuccio. 1265 to 1268 studied with Aquinas at the Santa Sabina studium provinciale. Possible scribe of the so-called "lectura romana" or "alia lectura fratris Thome", a reportatio on Aquinas' second commentary on the Sentences of Peter Lombard.
- Latino Malabranca Orsini (+1294). Before 1278 prior at Santa Sabina convent and studium. Cardinal.
- Hugh Aycelin, (Hughes of Billom). Before 1288 lector at the Santa Sabina studium. Master of the Sacred Palace from 1281 to 1288, Cardinal.

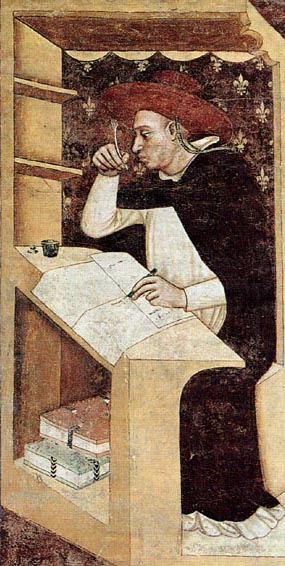
Hugh Aycelin. By Tommaso da Modena, 1352

== 1288 Studium particularis theologiae, 1291 Studium nove logice, 1305 Studium naturarum ==
- Milone da Velletri. 1293 lector at the Santa Sabina studium nove logice.
- Niccolò da Prato (+1321). Before 1296 lector at the Santa Maria sopra Minerva studium. Procurator general of the Roman curia.
- Bartolomeo da San Concordio (+1347). 1299 lector at the Santa Maria sopra Minerva studium. Author of the Summa de casibus coscientiae (1338) and of the Ammaestramenti degli antichi, the first collection of statements from ancient authors translated from Latin into the common Italian of his day. The latter work forms a manual or philosophical tretise on the virtues.
- Peter Baratta was assigned as lector at Santa Sabina in this period.
- Peter de Trutta of Viterbo was assigned as lector of the Sentences at Santa Sabina in this period.
- Peter de Cho' of Siena was lector at Santa Sabina in this period.
- Alexander and Martin of Orvieto studied under Peter de Cho' of Siena at the Santa Sabina studium.
- Filippo da Monte Vibiano (Phylippus de Monte Obiano) (+1322) was lector at the Santa Sabina studium.
- Giovanni da San Gemignano. 1305 lector at the Minerva studium. Author of the Summa de Exemplis ac Similitudinibus Rerum as well as the Sermones dominicales, pro adventu, Quadragesimale, Sermones de sanctis, de mortuis. In 1305 at the Minerva studium Fr. Angelo of Orvieto taught Aristotle's Metaphysics and De anima along with its commentaries.
- Angelo di messer Bertacone dei Salimbeni da Siena. 1305 studied philosophy at the Minerva studium.
- Giovanni de S. Agnete, Gerrardo and Simeone of Rome were assigned to Angelo di messer Bertacone dei Salimbeni da Siena as students at the Minerva studium.
- Giovanni dei Tornaquinci. 1310 lector at the Santa Sabina studium.
- Paolo di Aliotto da Narni. 1313 lector at the Santa Maria sopra Minerva studium in 1313.
- Nerius de Tertia. 1331 lector at the Santa Sabina studium.
- Giovanni Zocco da Spoleto. 1331 student of logic at the Santa Sabina studium.

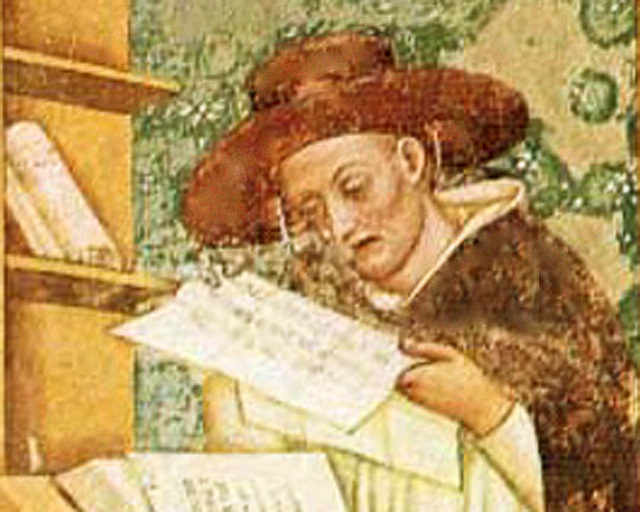
Matteo Orsini, by Tommaso da Modena, 1352

- Matteo Orsini. Probably taught 1316 to 1322 at the Minerva studium, between the end of his regency in Paris and his appointment as Provincial of the Roman province of the Order.
- Reginaldo (Nallo) Montemarte (+1348). Lector of theology at the studium at Santa Maria sopra Minerva. Montemarte entered the Order at Orvieto becoming baccalaureus there in 1330. He attended the studia generalia of the Order at Florence and Paris after 1331. Raymond of Capua praised Montemarte's erudition in his Legenda beate Agnetis de Monte Policiano calling him a "writer of great authority."
- Ambrogio da Chianciano (+1339). Lector at the Minerva studium. as was Tancredi dei Beccari da Orvieto.
- Iacopo Passavanti. After 1333 lector at the studium at Santa Maria sopra Minerva after finishing his studies in Paris c. 1333. Author of the Specchio di vera penitenza.
- Stefano da Rieti. 1338 lector at the studium conventuale at Santa Maria sopra Minerva.
- Giovanni dall’Incisa (+1348). 1338 lector at the studium conventuale at Santa Maria sopra Minerva.
- Joannes a S. Juvenali of Orvieto. 1340 taught at the Minerva studium.
- Andreas de Vannis de Gallo of Florence (+1347). Lector at the Minerva studium.
- Giacopo Cini of S. Andrea. 1344 baccalaureus at the Minerva studium. (+1378), author of an important commentary on the Sentences of Peter Lombard,

== 1426 Studium Generale ==
- Julianus de Laude. 1426 Magister at the Minerva studium
- Giuliano Naldi of Florence. 1459 professor of Sacred Theology and Prior at the Minerva studium.
- Annio da Viterbo obtained the degree of Master of Theology from the studium of Santa Maria sopra Minerva, and was lector there sometime before 1466.
- Ludovico Gentili Master of Sacred Theology completed his studies at the Minerva studium in 1477.
- Antonio Caramanico. 1507 regent master at the Santa Maria sopra Minerva studium generale. and again in 1525 after serving as the Provincial of the province of Sicily
- Gaspare da Perugia (1465–1531). 12 May 1512 appointed regent master at the Minerva studium by Master General of the Order of Preachers Thomas de Vio (Cajetan).
- Bartolomé Carranza de Miranda. May 1539 Master of Sacred Theology at the Minerva studium generale during the Order's general chapter at Rome. Former student and subsequently professor of theology at the College of San Gregorio at Valladolid.
- Giacomo Nacchiante (1502–1569). 1541 professor of philosophy and theology at the studium.
- Vincenzo Ercolani (1517–1586). 1546 c. taught theology at the Minerva studium. Author of numerous philosophical texts. Ercolani is credited with having saved the Minerva complex from the violence that erupted after the death of Pope Paul IV on August 18, 1559, when the Palace of the Inquisition was set aflame and the Dominicans of Rome were under attack.

== Modern history: 1577 Collegium Divi Thomae ==
- Sisto Fabri. Mid 1550s professor of theology at the Santa Maria sopra Minerva studium. Master of the Order of Preachers 1583–1598.
- Vincenzo Bonardi. Theology studies at the College of St. Thomas. Master of the Sacred Palace by Sixtus V in 1589 . Bonardi was appointed Secretary of the Sacred Congregation of the Index in 1583 by Pope Gregory XIII
- Diego Alvarez (1550 c. – 1635). 1596 to 1606 Professor of Sacred Theology at the college. Author of the De auxiliis divinae gratiae et humani arbitrii viribus and apologist for the Thomistic doctrines of grace and predestination.
- Tomas de Lemos. 1610 Professor of Sacred Theology at the college. In the Molinist controversy between Dominicans and Jesuits the papal commission or Congregatio de Auxiliis summoned Lemos and Alvarez to represent the Dominican Order in debates before Pope Clement VIII and Pope Paul V.
- Juan Gonzalez de Albelda. 1608 Regent of Studies at the college. Author of the Commentariorum & disputationum in primam partem Summa S. Thome de Aquino (1621)
- Giacinto Petroni, 1608 Bachelor of Theology, Professor of Theology, Master of the Sacred Palace 1614–1622.
- Gregorio Servantio (1563–1608). 1600 Baccalaureus at the college. Author of the Difesa della potestà, et immunità ecclesiastica.
- Isidoro Aliaga (1568–1648) Early 17th century lector at the college.
- Dominic Gravina. 1610 Professor of Sacred Theology at the college.
- Tommaso Caccini 1615 Baccalaureaus at the college. One of the principal critics of Galileo Galilei.
- Juan Gonzales de Leon. 1635- Regent at the college.
- Vincenzo Maria Fontana. 1637 c. completed studies under Vincenzo Candido at the college, was ordained in 1637, and became a master of theology in 1644. Author of Syllabus magistrorum S. Palatii apostolici (1663), and of Sacrum theatrum Dominicanum (1666).
- Giovanni Battista de Marinis. After 1624 Lector at the College of Saint Thomas.
- Niccolò Ridolfi Student at the College of St. Thomas. Author of the Apologia perfectionis vitae spiritualis (1632). and became rector there in 1630.
- Nicholas Riccardi. After 1621 Regent at the college.
- Michele Mazzarino. 1628 Professor of theology at the college. Mazzarino was appointed Master of the Sacred Palace under Pope Urban VIII in 1642, and Archbishop of Aix-en-Provence in 1645 by Pope Innocent X. He was brother of Cardinal Giulio Mazzarino, known as "Jules Mazarin", chief minister under Louis XIV of France.
- Hyacinthe Libelli (1617c.+1684). 1630-1634 student at the college, 1644 Doctor of Sacred Theology.
- Giovanni Battista Galvani. 1646 Baccalaureaus at the College of Saint Thomas. Appointed regent in 1662.
- Giacinto Libelli, 1650 c. Professor of Theology at the college.
- Paolino Bernardini. Before 1662 Professor at the college. Master of the Sacred Palace under Pope Alexander VIII.
- Tommaso Maria Ferrari. Before 1677 Philosophy studies at the college. 1688 Master of the Sacred Palace.
- Gregorio Selleri. 1677 completed his studies in theology and philosophy at the college and was made lector there. Selleri later fostered the condemnation of Jansenism through contributions to the papal bull Unigenitus of Pope Clement XI in 1713.
- Juan Melendez (+1690). 1681 Regent at the college. Author of Tesoros verdaderos de las Yndias, en la Historia de la gran Provincia del Peru.
- Vincenzo Ludovico Gotti. 1688 Professor of Pat the College of Saint Thomas. Gotti was perhaps the leading Thomist of his time. His writings include several polemics against Luther and Calvin as well as commentaries on the works of Thomas Aquinas. Cardinal Lambertini, who was later elected Pope Benedict XIV said to the College of Cardinals of Gotti at the Papal conclave of 1740 "If you wish to elect a saint, choose Gotti; a statesman, Aldrovandi; an honest man, me".
- Antoine Massoulié. (1632–1706) taught theology at the college.
- Agustín Pipia (1660–1730). 1701 Regent of the college.
- Norbert Delbecque. (+1714). 1700-1706 professor of theology at the college. Theologian sympathetic to the Jansenist cause. Author of Votum P. Delbecque in favorem Declatationis et Responsionis Petri Codei.
- Ignace Hyacinthe Amat de Graveson (1670–1733) taught theology at the college. Historian and theologian.
- Vittorio Giovardi (1699–1785). After 1717 Theology studies.
- Giovanni Battista de Rossi. Studied theology at the college before 1721.
- Antoine Brémond (1692–1755) Professor of Sacred Theology c. 1730. Later Master of the Order.
- Giuseppe Agostino Orsi. 1732 Professor of Sacred Theology at the college.
- Casto Innocenzio Ansaldi. 1733 studied at the college. Famed theologian and archaeologist.
- Giovanni Battista Audiffredi. Taught theology at the College of St. Thomas after 1749.
- Salvatore Roselli (1722–1784). professor of theology at the college, and author of the pioneering six volume Summa philosophica (1777) giving an Aristotelian interpretation of Aquinas validating the senses as a source of knowledge.
- Vitus Anton Winter. 1786 Doctorate in Theology
- Francesco Albertini (1770–1819). 1795 completed his theological studies at the college. Servant of God
- Giacinto Achilli 1833. Master of Sacred Theology at the college. Author of Dealings with the inquisition: or, Papal Rome, her priests, and her Jesuits... (1851).
- Alberto Guglielmotti (1812–1892). 1837 completed his studies in philosophy and theology at the college and was made professor of physics and mathematics. In 1849 Guglielmotti became Master of Theology and Regent of Studies.
- Joseph Sadoc Alemany. 1840 made Lector in Theology at the college."Upon the completion of his studies, he was awarded the degree of Lectorate in Theology at the Minerva, one of the venerable centers of Dominican life and culture." Missionary to California. Alemany was the first Archbishop of Monterey, California (1850–1853) and first Archbishop of San Francisco (1853–1884).
- Emanuele Alemany (born 1817). 1833 studied at the college under Francesco Xarrie' when religious order were suppressed in his native Spain. Brother of Joseph Sadoc Alemany. Alemany became lector in theology at the College of St. Thomas in 1844 and Master of theology at Florence.
- Vincenzo Maria Gatti. 1828 entered the novitiate at Santa Sabina and completed his theological and philosophical studies at the college. Gatti served as lector there from 1838 to 1847. Author of Indipendenza d'Italia e religione (1854), Principio protestante e principio cattolico (1854), and Institutiones apologetico-polemicae de veritate ac divinitate religionis et Ecclesiae catholicae (I–III, 1866–67). In 1872 Pope Pius IX appointed Gatti Master of the Sacred Palace. Gatti defended papal infallibility says of Christ's words "I have prayed for thee," etc., that "indefectibity is promised to Peter apart from (seorsum) the Church, or from the Apostles; but it is not promised to the Apostles, or to the Church. apart (seorsum) the head, or with the head," adding "Therefore Peter, even apart from (seorsum) the Church, is infallible." Gatti was also instrumental in rehabilitating the works of Antonio Rosmini-Serbati, author of The Constitution of Social Justice and Of the five wounds of the Holy Church, after they had been opposed especially among the Jesuits and were placed on the Index in 1849.
- Thomas Nicholas Burke (1830–1882). Studied philosophy and theology at the college in 1848 and became lector there in 1854
- Joseph Mullooly (1812–1880), initiator of the excavations at the Roman Basilica of San Clemente became lector in Sacred Theology at the college in 1849.
- Hermann Ernst Plassmann (1817–1864). Master of Sacred Theology at the college in 1856.
- Mariano Spada (1796–1872). Later Master of the Sacred Palace and author of the influential works on the Immaculate Conception preceding it dogmatic definition in 1854 by Pope Pius IX, was professor at the college in mid-century. Spada also wrote Esame Critico sulla dottrina dell’ Angelico Dottore S. Tommaso di Aquino circa il Peccato originale, relativamente alla Beatissima Vergine Maria (1839)
- Narciso Puig (d. 1865). Professor of theology at the college. Puig co-authored with Francisco Xarrié the Institutiones Theologicæ ad mentem D. Thomæ Aquinatis, and the Opusculum in quo plurimi errores refelluntur nostris temporibus granssantes as well as other works.
- Francisco Xarrie (d. 1866). Professor at the college.
- Alberto Lepidi. Called in 1885 by Pope Leo XIII to begin teaching Sacred theology at the college.
- Gian Battista Embriaco (Ceriana 1829 – Rome 1903). Taught at the college. Embriaco was the inventor in 1867 of the hydrochronometer, examples of which were built in Rome, first in the college's courtyard at the Minerva, and later on the Pincian Hill and in the Villa Borghese gardens. Embriaco had presented two prototypes of his invention at the Paris Universal Exposition in 1867 winning prizes and acclaim.
- Vincenzo Nardini (d. 1913). !855 Lector at the college teaching mathematics, experimental physics, chemistry and astronomy. Completed his theological and philosophical studies at the college. Nardini reorganized the institute of science founded at the college in 1840 by Albert Gugliemotti. He believed the doctrines of Aquinas to be the only means to reconcile science and faith. Nardini was a founding member of the Accademia Romana di San Tommaso in 1879. Between 1901 and 1902 he also founded an astronomical observatory on via di Pie’ di Marmo in Rome. In 1904 as Provincial of the Order's Roman province he proposed that the college be transformed into an international university. This was accomplished in 1908 by his successors.
- Andreas Frühwirth. 1870, Lectorate at the College of Saint Thomas.
- Tommaso Maria Zigliara. 1870-1879 taught at the college. Served as Rector from 1873 to 1879. Zigliara was a member of seven Roman congregations, including the Congregation of Studies and was a founding member of the Accademia Romana di San Tommaso in 1879. Zigliara's fame as a scholar at the forefront of the Neo-Thomist revival was widespread in Rome and abroad. "French, Italian, German, English, and American bishops were eager to put some of their most promising students and young professors under his tuition."
- Raffaele Pierotti. After 1870 taught in the college. Master of the Sacred Palace
- Henry Denifle (1844–1905). 1866 studied with Zigliara at the college. Austrian philosopher, paleographer, and historian, after his ordination in Graz. In 1877 Denifle stood the examination "ad gradum" in Rome and was created a Master of Sacred Theology.
- Paul Benoit. 1874 Doctorate of Sacred Theology
- Thomas Esser (1850–1926). 1874 studied theology at the college with Tommaso Maria Zigliara, Raffaele Pierotti, and Giacinto Frati. Author of Die Lehre des hl. Thomas von Aquino über die Möglichkeit einer anfanglosen Schöpfung (Munster, 1895). He later served as a professor of Canon Law at the college.
- Adolphe Tanquerey, OP, (+1932). 1878, Doctorate in Sacred Theology. One of the greatest and most famous authors in the tradition of scholastic manual theology.
- Girolamo Maria Mancini. 1878-1898 taught at the college. Author of Elementa philosophiae ad mentem D. Thomae Aquinatis doctoris angelici (1898). In his early masterpiece Portrait of the Artist as a Young Man James Joyce makes reference to Aquinas' doctrines through his knowledge of Mancini's Elementa
- Innocenzo Taurisano (1877–1960). 1903 completed his novitiate and theology and philosophy studies at the college. Paleographer and historian.
- Filippo Maria Guidi (1815–1879). Mid-1800s professor of philosophy and theology at the college. Master of Sacred Theology.
- Henri Didon (1840–1900). 1862 complete his theological studies at the college. Famed French preacher and coiner of the Olympic motto Citius, Altius, Fortius.
- Placido Riccardi O.S.B. 1865–1871, theology studies, Blessed.
- Martin Grabmann. 1901 Doctorate in Philosophy, 1902 Doctorate of Sacred Theology historian. Historian of medieval theology and philosophy.
- Vladimir Ghika. 1905 Doctorate of Sacred Theology, Diplomat and essayist, Roman Catholic convert, priest and martyr of the Romanian Communist regime, Blessed.

== 1906 Pontificium Collegium Divi Thomae de Urbe ==
- Hugh Pope, O.P., 1908–1911. Taught Philosophy and Theology at the college. 1908–1911. New Testament Exegesis. Master of Sacred Theology in 1911.
- Juan Gonzáles Arintero (+ 1928). 1909-1912 taught apologetics at the Angelicum. Theologian, Venerable.
- Réginald Marie Garrigou-Lagrange O.P. 1909–1960 Professor of Philosophy and Theology.
- Edouard Hugon O.P. 1909–1929 Professor of Philosophy.
- Daniel Callus (1888–1965). In 1924 the Maltese historian and scholar of medieval philosophy was ordained on November 6, 1910, and pursued postgraduate studies at the Angelicum. He sat the examination ad gradum and was made a Master of Sacred Theology.
- Servant of God Anton Durcovici. 1911 Durcovici completed his studies in philosophy at the Angelicum.
- Paul Marie André Richaud. 1915 Doctorate in Philosophy,
- Santiago María Ramírez Ruíz de Dulanto (1891–1967). 1917 Doctorate in Philosophy. 1917-20 professor of Philosophy: Logic, Critica, Cosmology, Psychology, History of Modern Philosophy. Philosopher and theologian.
- Michael Browne, O.P. (1887–1971). Professor of theology from 1919 to 1932 and 1941–1951, and Rector from 1932 to 1941. Master of the Sacred Palace from 1951 to 1955, and Master General of the Order of Preachers from 1955 to 1962.
- Georges Thierry d'Argenlieu, 1920 theology studies.
- Marie-Dominique Chenu O.P., 1920 Doctorate in Sacred Theology. Theologian.
- Francis Jeremiah Connell 1921 Doctorate in Sacred Theology. Noted American theologian. Dissertation entitled De scientia beata Christi.
- Angelo Pirotta studied at the Angelicum from 1917 to 1921 receiving his licentiate and doctorate in philosophy with theses entitled De reali distinctione inter essentiam et esse in creatis and De Supposto et Persona respectively. Pirotta taught at the Angelicum from 1926 to 1928. Pirotta's magnum opus is the Summa Philosophiae Aristotelico-Thomisticae (6 volumes). He also wrote several commentaries on the works of Aristotle.
- Joseph Lilly, C.M., 1922 Doctorate in Sacred Theology.
- Urban John Vehr, 1924, Licentiate of Canon Law.
- Daniel Callus O.P., 1924, Master of Sacred Theology. Maltese historian and philosopher.
- Fulton Sheen, Beatified, 1924 Doctorate in Sacred Theology. Philosopher, theologian, media personality, Roman Catholic Archbishop,Blessed
- Maurice Zundel (1897–1975), 1927 Doctorate in Philosophy. Theologian.
- George John Rehring, 1928, Doctorate in Sacred Theology.
- Joseph Kiwánuka 1932, Doctorate in Canon Law.
- Maurice Roy, 1929 Doctorate in Philosophy. Late Cardinal, Archbishop emeritus of the Roman Catholic Archdiocese of Québec (Canada).
- Jacek Woroniecki, O.P., Servant of God, 1929-1933 Moral Theology and Pedagogy.
  (1878–1949) Dominican lecturer at the University of Lublin in moral theology, rector of the university from 1922 to 1924. Woroniecki was the author of more than 70 works in moral theology and pedagogy. August 22, 1929 he was appointed professor of moral theology and pedagogy at the Angelicum. He was the founder of Zgromadzenie Sióstr Dominikanek Misjonarek Jezusa i Maryi (the Congregation of Sisters Dominicans Missionaries of Jesus and Mary)
- Tit Liviu Chinezu, 1930 Doctor of Sacred Theology. Bishop, victim of post-war Catholic persecution in Hungary.
- Marie-Alain Couturier, 1930-32 studied theology. Liturgical aesthetician, stained glass designer and promoter of Le Corbusier's Sainte Marie de La Tourette.
- Giuseppe Girotti, O.P., 1930 Sacred Scripture student, martyr at Dachau concentration camp in 1945, declared "Righteous Among the Nations" by Yad Vashem in 1995, Catholic martyr declared Venerable by Pope Francis on 8 April 2013, will be beatified on 26 April 2014.
- Thomas Cooray O.M.I., 1931 Doctorate in Philosophy. Late Cardinal, Archbishop of the Roman Catholic Archdiocese of Colombo (Sri Lanka)
- Joseph Clifford Fenton, 1931 Doctorate in Sacred Theology. Theologian.
- Ioan Suciu, 1925–1931 Doctorate in Sacred Theology. Auxiliary Bishop of Oradea, victim of post-war Catholic perscution in Hungary.
- Gerald Vann 1931.Doctorate in Sacred Theology. English Catholic Theologian and Philosopher.
- Mario Luigi Ciappi 1933 Doctorate of Sacred Theology. Dissertation entitled De divina misericordia ut prima causa operum Dei. At the Angelicum Ciappi was professor of dogmatic theology and served as Dean of the Faculty of Theology from 1935 to 1955. Ciappi also served as Theologian of the Pontifical Household under Pope Paul VI and advised the Pontif during the drafting of the encyclical Humanae Vitae
- Józef Maria Bocheński O.P., 1934 Doctorate in Sacred Theology. Historian of Logic, neo-Thomist philosopher and theologian, member of the "Cracow Circle". Bocheński taught logic at the Angelicum 1934–1940.
- Bruno Heim, 1934 Doctorate in Philosophy. Late Titular Archbishop of Xanthus, Apostolic Nuncio emeritus to Great Britain, prominent armorists of twentieth century ecclesiastical heraldry.
- Jean-Marie Villot (1905–1979) Licentiate in canon law, 1934 Doctorate in Sacred theology. Archbishop of Lyon from 1965 to 1967, Prefect of the Congregation for Council from 1967 to 1969, Vatican Secretary of State from 1969 to 1979, and Camerlengo from 1970 to 1979.
- Louis-Jean Guyot, 1935 Doctorate in Sacred Theology. Archbishop of Toulouse, France, 1966–1978, Cardinal.
- Hilary Paweł Januszewski O.C.D. (1907–1945), 1935 Licentiate in Theology. Victim of the Nazi regime at Dachau concentration camp, Professor of Church history and systematics, One of the "108 Martyrs of World War II" beatified by Pope John Paul II on 13 June 1999, Blessed.
- Paul-Pierre Philippe. 1935–1939; 1945-1950 History of Spirituality and of Mystical Theology.
- Denis Hurley, 1936 Licentiate in Philosophy. Bishop of Durban, South Africa
- Dominique Pire O.P., 1936 Doctorate in Sacred Theology. Laureate of the Nobel Peace Prize (1958)
- Silvio Oddi, 1936 Doctorate of Canon Law. Cardinal, Prefect emeritus of the Congregation for the Clergy.
- Candido Amantini Licentiate in Theology.
- George Duggan, 1937, Doctorate of Sacred Theology.
- Cornelio Fabro C.S.S., 1937 Doctorate in Sacred Theology. Philosopher and theologian.
- Johannes Willebrands, 1937 Doctorate in Philosophy. Cardinal, President emeritus of the Pontifical Council for Promoting Christian Unity
- Annibale Bugnini 1938 Doctorate in Sacred Theology. Dissertation entitled De liturgia eiusque momento in Concilio Tridentino
- Anthony John King Mussio 1939 Doctorate in Canon Law.
- Stanisław Wiórek, 1939 Licentiate in Theology, Polish Catholic theologian and priest, murdered by the Nazis on the ninth day of the Second World War, Servant of God.
- Mieczysław Albert Krąpiec 1946 Doctorate in Philosophy, Krąpiec completed a dissertation under the supervision of Servant of God Jacek Woroniecki entitled De naturali amore Dei super omnia in creatura. Krąpiec later founded the Lublin School of Philosophy as professor and Rector Magnificus of the Catholic University of Lublin.
- Edward A. McCarthy, 1948 Doctorate in Sacred Theology with a dissertation entitled "Epiky: a theoretical study of the virtue of epiky and its use, along with a historical review of the development of the doctrine on this subject".
- Jorge María Mejía, 1948 Doctorate in Sacred Theology. Cardinal, Archivist and Librarian emeritus of the Holy Roman Church.

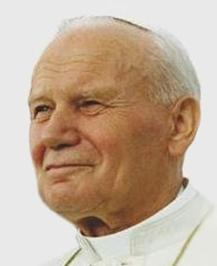
Angelicum alumnus Pope John Paul II in 1993

- Álvaro del Portillo 1948 Doctorate in Canon Law. Blessed
- Karol Wojtyła, 1948 Doctorate of Sacred Theology, later Pope John Paul II, later canonised. Philosopher, theologian.
- Joseph Lloyd Hogan, 1949 Doctorate in Sacred Theology. Bishop of Rochester, New York.
- Louis-Albert Vachon, 1949 Doctorate in Sacred Theology. Late Cardinal, Archbishop of Québec (Canada)
- Ernest Fortin, 1950 Licentiate in Sacred Theology
- Lorenzo Antonetti, 1951 Licentiate of Sacred Theology. Cardinal, President emeritus of the Administration of the Patrimony of the Apostolic See, Pontifical Delegate emeritus for the Patriarchal Basilica of St. Francis in Assisi.
- Alberto Bovone, 1951 Doctorate in Canon Law. Late Cardinal, Prefect emeritus of the Congregation for the Causes of Saints.
- James Aloysius Hickey, 1951 Doctorate of Sacred Theology. late Cardinal, Archbishop emeritus of the Roman Catholic Archdiocese of Washington (USA).
- Remi De Roo, 1952 Doctorate of Sacred Theology. Bishop of Victoria, Canada.
- Georges Cottier O.P., 1952 Licentiate of Sacred Theology. Emeritus Theologian of the Pontifical Household, Cardinal.
- Jean Jérôme Hamer, 1952-53 taught theology.
- Altamiro Rossato 1953 Doctorate in Philosophy, 1955 Doctorate in Theology.
- Charles Asa Schleck, C.S.C, 1953, Doctorate in Theology.
- Javier Echevarría Rodríguez, 1954, Doctor of Canon Law. Bishop (Catholic Church), current head of the Prelature of the Holy Cross and Opus Dei.
- Gerald Moverley, 1954 Doctorate of Canon Law. Late Bishop of the Roman Catholic Diocese of Hallam (England)
- Servais-Théodore Pinckaers O.P., 1954 Doctorate in Sacred Theology. Theologian.
- Salvino Busuttil 1961, Doctorate in Philosophy. Philosopher, Economist. Dissertation: Value in Karl Marx .
- Leonard Boyle, 1956–61, Professor of Latin Palaeography and History of Medieval Theology.
- Julián Herranz Casado, 1956, Doctorate of Canon Law. Cardinal, President emeritus of the Pontifical Council for the Interpretation of Legislative Texts
- Fernando Sebastián Aguilar, 1957, Doctorate in Sacred Theology with a dissertation entitled Maternitatis divinae diversa ratio apud Didacum Alvarez et Franciscum Suarez.
- Claude Geffré, 1957 Doctorate in Sacred Theology with a dissertation was entitled Le Péché comme injustice et manquement à l'amour. French Roman Catholic theologian.
- José Saraiva Martins, 1958 Doctorate in Sacred Theology. C.M.F., Cardinal, Prefect of the Congregation for the Causes of Saints.
- William Wakefield Baum, 1958 Doctorate in Sacred Theology. Cardinal, Major Penitentiary emeritus, Archbishop emeritus of the Roman Catholic Archdiocese of Washington (United States)
- Dom M. Basil Pennington O.C.S.O. (1931–2005), 1959 Licentiate in Theology. Leading Roman Catholic spiritual writer, speaker, teacher, and director.
- Mar Varkey Vithayathil C.Ss.R., 1959 Doctorate of Canon Law. Cardinal, Major Archbishop of the Syro-Malabar Catholic Archdiocese of Ernakulam-Angamaly (India).
- Aloysius Ambrozic, 1960 Licentiate of Sacred Theology. Cardinal, Archbishop emeritus of the Roman Catholic Archdiocese of Toronto (Canada)
- Alfonso López Trujillo, 1960 Doctorate of Philosophy. Late Cardinal, President of the Pontifical Council for the Family, Archbishop emeritus of the Roman Catholic Archdiocese of Medellín (Colombia)
- Aniceto Fernández Alonso taught the physical sciences and cosmology at the Angelicum 1950–58. Master of the Order of Preachers (1962–1974).
- Nicholas Gruner 1974 Licentiate in Sacred Theology.
- Thomas C. Kelly O.P., 1962 Doctorate of Canon Law. Archbishop emeritus of the Roman Catholic Archdiocese of Louisville (USA).

== 1963 Pontificia Studiorum Universitas a Sancto Thoma Aquinate in Urbe ==
- Santos Abril y Castelló, 1963 Doctorate in Social Science. Dissertation entitled Autores clásicos favorables a la disolubilidad del matrimonio rato y consumado?
- Velasio de Paolis 1965, Licentiate in Theology.
- John Patrick Foley, 1965 Doctorate of Philosophy. Cardinal, President emeritus of the Pontifical Council for Social Communications, Grand Master of the Equestrian Order of the Holy Sepulchre of Jerusalem.
- Nicolás de Jesús López Rodríguez, 1965 Licentiate in Social Science. Cardinal, Archbishop of the Roman Catholic Archdiocese of Santo Domingo (Dominican Republic), Military Ordinary for the Dominican Republic.
- Noël A. Kinsella, 1966 Doctorate of Philosophy. Senator and Speaker of the Senate of Canada (Canada)
- John Michael D'Arcy 1968 Doctorate in Sacred Theology. Diocesan bishop of the Diocese of Fort Wayne-South Bend, Indiana.
- Diarmuid Martin, 1969. Archbishop of Dublin, Ireland.
- Thomas Chakiath, 1972 Doctorate in Social Science. Retired Syro Malabar Catholic Bishop.
- Paul Cremona O.P., 1973 Doctorate in Sacred Theology. Archbishop of the Roman Catholic Archdiocese of Malta (Malta)
- Michel Gervais 1973, Doctorate in Sacred Theology.
- Donald Wuerl, 1974 Doctorate in Sacred Theology. Cardinal, Metropolitan Archbishop of the Roman Catholic Archdiocese of Washington (USA)
- Giuseppe Sciacca Licentiate in Canon Law. 2013 Appointed Adjunct Secretary of the Apostolic Signatura, the Supreme Tribunal of the Holy See.
- José Raúl Vera López, OP, 1975 Licentiate of Sacred Theology. Bishop of the Roman Catholic Diocese of Saltillo. 2012 Nobel Peace Prize nominee known for his defense of human rights and social justice.
- Timothy Dolan, 1976 Licentiate of Sacred Theology. Cardinal Archbishop of New York City, President, U.S. Conference of Catholic Bishops, Time Magazine World's Most Influential People in 2012.Cardinal of the Roman Catholic Archdiocese of New York (USA)
- Edwin Frederick O'Brien, 1976 Doctorate of Sacred Theology. Metropolitan Archbishop of the Roman Catholic Archdiocese of Baltimore (USA).
- Marc Ouellet P.S.S., 1976 Licentiate in Philosophy. Cardinal, Archbishop of the Roman Catholic Archdiocese of Québec (Canada) and Primate of Canada.
- Anders Piltz O.P. 1976. Latinist and medievalist.
- Paulos Faraj Rahho, 1976 Licentiate in Sacred Theology. Late Archbishop of the Archeparchy of Mosul of Chaldeans (Iraq).
- Kevin Farrell, 1976 Licentiate of Sacred Theology in pastoral theology (1977). Prefect of the Dicastery for Laity, Family and Life, and Cardinal as of 19 November 2016.
- Anselmo Guido Pecorari 1977, Doctorate in Sacred Theology, 1980 Doctorate in Canon Law.
- J. Peter Sartain, 1977 Bachelor of Sacred Theology. Archbishop of Seattle, Washington, "Archbishop Delegate" of the Congregation for the Doctrine of the Faith overseeing the reform of the Leadership Conference of Women Religious in the United States.
- Peter Smith, 1977 Doctorate in Sacred Theology. Metropolitan Archbishop of the Roman Catholic Archdiocese of Southwark (England)
- Daniel Acharuparambil O.C.D., 1978 Doctorate in Philosophy, late Archbishop of Diocese of Verapoly, India.
- Marcelo Sánchez Sorondo, 1978 Doctor of Sacred Theology. Titular Bishop of Forum Novum (Vescovio), Member of the Pontifical Commission for Latin America, Chancellor of the Pontifical Academy of Sciences and of the Pontifical Academy of Social Sciences.
- Tomas Tyn O.P., Servant of God, 1978 Doctorate in Sacred Theology. Theologian.
- Michael John Sheridan 1980 Doctor of Sacred Theology. Dissertation was entitled The Theology of the Local Church in Vatican II. Bishop of Colorado Springs.
- Jerome Edward Listecki, 1981 Doctorate of Canon Law. Archbishop of the Roman Catholic Archdiocese of Milwaukee (USA)
- James T. McHugh, 1981 Doctorate in Sacred Theology. Late Bishop of Roman Catholic Diocese of Rockville Centre (USA).
- Timothy O'Donnell, 1981 Doctorate of Sacred Theology. Theologian and President of Christendom College.
- Thomas Elavanal 1983 Doctorate in Sacred Theology
- Thierry de Roucy 1983, Licentiate in Sacred Theology. Founder and President of Heart's Home, a Catholic Movement that promotes a culture of compassion.
- Mark Miravalle, 1985 Doctorate of Sacred Theology. Theologian, President of International Catholic Movement Vox Populi Mariae Mediatrici
- Robert Francis Prevost, OSA, 1985 Doctorate of Canon Law. He was elected pope in May 2025, choosing the name Leo XIV. He was formerly Prior General of the Order of Saint Augustine and later become a bishop and cardinal under Pope Francis, as well as Prefect of the Dicastery of Bishops.
- Robert Reed, 1985 Master of Sacred Theology. Priest, President of The CatholicTV Network and host of television programs including WOW: The CatholicTV Challenge
- Randolph Roque Calvo, 1986 Doctorate of Canon Law. Bishop of Bishop of Reno, Nevada.
- Everard de Jong, 1986, Licentiate in Philosophy.
- Edward Janiak, 1986 Doctorate in Sacred Theology. Bishop of Kalisz, Poland.
- Jose S. Palma, 1987, Doctorate in Sacred Theology. Archbishop of Cebu, Philippines.
- Wojciech Giertych O.P., 1989 Doctorate in Sacred Theology. Theologian of the Pontifical Household.
- Michael Owen Jackels, 1989 Doctorate in Sacred Theology. Metropolitan Archbishop of Roman Catholic Archdiocese of Dubuque (USA)
- Kevin McDonald, 1989 Doctorate in Sacred Theology. Emeritus Archbishop of the Roman Catholic Archdiocese of Southwark (England).
- Wim Eijk, 1990 Doctorate of Philosophy. Cardinal and Metropolitan Archbishop of the Roman Catholic Archdiocese of Utrecht (Netherlands)
- Paolo Pezzi F.S.C.B., 1990 Licentiate in Sacred Theology. Metropolitan Archbishop of the Roman Catholic Archdiocese of Mother of God at Moscow (Russian Federation)
- Kevin John Dunn, 1991 Doctorate in Canon Law. Late Bishop of the Roman Catholic Diocese of Hexham and Newcastle (England)
- Carlos Azpiroz Costa O.P., 1992 Doctorate in Canon Law. Former Master of the Order of Preachers
- Timothy Radcliffe O.P., 1992–2001 Grand Chancellor of the Angelicum and Master of the Dominican Order.
- Joseph Gontrand Decoste 1993, Doctorate of Sacred Theology. Dissertation entitled Contemplation et mission : étude critique de la spiritualité missionnaire de Charles de Foucault.
- John Folda 1993 Licentiate of Sacred Theology.
- Robert Dwayne Gruss 1993 Bachelor of Sacred Theology, MA in Spiritual Theology, 1994. Bishop of the Diocese of Rapid City in South Dakota.
- Wojciech Giertych O.P. 1994–present Moral Theology. 2005–present Theologian of the Pontifical Household.
- Timothy Dolan 1994–2001 Theology. Cardinal Archbishop of New York City.
- Konrad Krajewski. 1995 Doctorate of Sacred Theology He was a papal master of ceremonies from 1998 to 2013. In 2013 Pope Francis appointed him Papal Almoner and Paul Titular Archbishop of Benevento.
- Paul Murray O.P., 1994–present Theology. Appointed Almoner of His Holiness Pope Francis, Titular Archbishop of Benevento.
- Helen Alford O.P., taught 1996 Social Sciences, 2001-present Dean of the Faculty of Social Sciences.
- Paul D. Etienne, 1995 Licentiate of Sacred Theology, Archbishop of Anchorage, Alaska.
- Leonard Paul Blair, 1996 Doctorate of Sacred Theology. Bishop of the Roman Catholic Diocese of Toledo (USA)
- Mieczysław Mokrzycki, 1996 Doctorate of Sacred Theology. Archbishop of the Roman Catholic Archdiocese of Lviv of the Latins (Ukraine)
- Charles Morerod O.P., taught 1996 Dogmatic Theology, 2004–2009 Philosophy, 2009–2011 Rector Magnificus.
- Fortunatus Nwachukwu, 1996 Doctorate of Canon Law. Titular Archbishop of Aquaviva and Apostolic Nuncio to Nicaragua.
- Baselios Cleemis, 1997 Doctorate of Sacred Theology
- James F. Checchio, 1998 Doctorate of Canon Law. Rector of the Pontifical North American College in Rome.
- Gallela Prasad, 1999 Doctorate in Sacred Theology. Fourth Bishop of the Roman Catholic Diocese of Cuddapah, in Andhra Pradesh, India.
- Sviatoslav Shevchuk, 1999 Doctorate in Sacred Theology. Head and Major Archbishop of the Ukrainian Greek Catholic Church (Ukraine).
- Daniel E. Flores 2000, Doctorate in Sacred Theology. Bishop of Brownsville, Texas.
- Carlos Azpiroz Costa O.P., 2001–2010 Grand Chancellor of the Angelicum and Master of the Dominican Order.
- Gintaras Grusas, 2001, Doctorate of Canon Law. Archbishop of Vilnius Lituania.
- Luís Gonzaga Silva Pepeu, O.F.M., 2001 Doctorate in Canon Law. Bishop of Vitória da Conquista, Bahia, Brazil.
- Boaventura Cardoso 2002, Licentiate in Social Sciences.
- Ragheed Ganni, 2003 Licentiate of Sacred Theology. Chaldean Catholic priest, ecumenist and victim of anti-Christian violence after the Iraq War of 2003.
- Andrew H. Cozzens, 2008 Doctorate in Sacred Theology. Titular Bishop of Bisica and Auxiliary to the Bishop of the Archdiocese of Saint Paul and Minneapolis appointed 11 October 2013.
- Bruno Cadoré O.P., 2010–present Grand Chancellor of the Angelicum and Master of the Dominican Order.
- Miroslav Konštanc Adam, O.P., 2012 to 2016 served as rector of the Angelicum.
- Antonio Arregui Yarza, Doctorate in Canon Law. Metropolitan Archbishop of the Roman Catholic Archdiocese of Guayaquil (Ecuador).
- Nicola Canali, late Cardinal, President of the Pontifical Commission for Vatican City State, Major Penitentiary emeritus
- David R. Choby, Licentiate in Canon Law. Bishop of the Roman Catholic Diocese of Nashville (USA).
- Pia de Solenni, Bachelor's Degree in Sacred Theology.
- Albert, 12th Prince of Thurn and Taxis, Doctorate in Philosophy, 2022. Dissertation entitled Rational Nature Or Wishful Thinking? Freedom & Rationality in Aquinas And Their Medieval Critique.
