= John Matthew Rispoli =

Maltese philosopher (1582–639)

- Born: 17 August 1582; Senglea, Malta
- Died: 6 April 1639 (aged 56); Catania, Sicily.
- Occupations: Philosopher, theologian, author and musician
- Parent: John Vincent Rispoli x Catherine

John Matthew Rispoli (17 August 1582 – 6 April 1639) was a Maltese philosopher of great erudition. He was held in high esteem by the Grand Masters of the Knights Hospitaller Order, the Bishops of Malta, the Viceroys of Sicily, cardinals, bishops, inquisitors, and the common people. Perhaps the most eminent Maltese philosopher of the Middle Ages, the various extant writings of his are witness to his philosophical aptitude and dexterity as to his high calibre as a philosopher. These qualities were highly appreciated during his lifetime, in Malta as in France and Italy. He lived a busy life, both as an intellectual and as an administrator. He was professor of philosopher at various institutions of high education, an able preacher, and an official at various posts within the Dominican Order, of which his was a member. He was an avid aficionado of music, and was talented with playing musical instruments. Though the fame of holiness accompanied him in his life, this did not deter the Inquisition from suspecting him of heresy, and keeping him in its dungeons for fourteen months. When he died, he was given an almost state funeral.

== Life ==
=== Birth and education ===
Rispoli was born in Senglea, Malta, on 17 August 1582, to John Vincent and Catherine. He was christened John Mary. His father was a pilot on one of the galleys of the Knights Hospitaller. This suggests that the family enjoyed a decent financial income. In fact, Rispoli was given a good education from an early age.

=== A Dominican friar ===
At sixteen years of age, in 1598, Rispoli joined the Dominican Order at the Annunciation Priory of Vittoriosa. He was formally admitted a year later, and given the name John Matthew as a sign of his new religious status. Thereafter, he was sent to Palermo, Sicily, to begin and complete his institutional education at the Dominican Studium Generale there in philosophy and theology.

=== At Paris ===
Rispoli's initial studies ended seven years later, in 1606. Though he returned to Malta to commence his academic and pastoral work, he came under the eye of Alof de Wignacourt, Grand Master to the Knights Hospitaller, who conceded him protection. Most probably, this was due to Rispoli's intellectual capabilities as much as the high esteem in which the Grand Master held his father, whom, as recompense for his thirty-seven years in the service of the Knights Hospitaller, had been elected Donat and Brother in the Order. Whatever the case, the Grand Master personally recommended Rispoli to King Henry IV of France in order to ensue his theological studies at the University of Sorbonne, in Paris. Thus Rispoli left almost immediately for France. This gave the twenty-four-year-old Rispoli an opportunity to upgrade his studies at one of the then most illustrious centres of learning in the world, and show his true colours. In fact, as it happened, this opening gave him great prestige throughout his whole life.

Rispoli remained in Paris for the next six years. Throughout his stay there he was known as le Jacobin Maltois, the Maltese Dominican (since in France the Dominicans were known as Jacobins because their first convent in Paris was built near the church of Saint Jacques). His outstanding intelligence and erudition can be gauged from the fact that, just over two years into his studies at the Sorbonne, in 1609, the twenty-seven-year-old Rispoli was earmarked to be appointed professor to the seat theology teaching on Lombard's Sentences . Unfortunately, the professorship was eventually awarded to one of the two French candidates who were presented together with Rispoli, this being solely due to their nationality, since Rispoli was clearly tanto dotto e più di quelli due (by far much brighter than the other two).

=== In the limelight ===
Despite this setback which could have changed his life forever, during that same year (1609) Rispoli published a book which impressed his peers and contemporaries. It was entitled Status Controversiæ Prædefinitionum et Prædeterminationum cum Libero Arbitrio (The State of the Question dealing with the Predefinition and the Predestination of Free Will). Basically, Rispoli concludes that divine grace fully respects human freedom, and does not tarnish it in any way. This conclusion clearly sides with the position of the Dominican Domingo Bañez against the Jesuit Luis Molina in the famous and very often acrimonious controversy on the intervention of divine grace in relation to free will. The work surely did not go unnoticed for, some two years later, in 1611, it threw him in the limelight. It so happened that, in 1611, the General Chapter of the Dominican Order, gathering some 450 Dominicans from across the world, met at Paris. As was the custom, four of the best scholars were chosen to carry out a public disputation, and Rispoli was the first to be given this great honour. According to one contemporary, Rispoli's disputation, held on May 15, 1611, was attended by the whole academic world of Paris, the Apostolic Nuntio to the King of France (Roberto Ubaldini), the bishops of Montpellier and Orléans together with a great number of ecclesiastics, and of course the Capitular friars, including the Master of the Dominican Order.

Rispoli's performance that day left a deep an impression upon his illustrious audience. Eyewitnesses attested that his words were docte et gloriose (brilliant and persuasive), and that they were received cum laude (with great praise). The impact was so great that the Apostolic Nuntio there and then requested of the Master of the Order that he grants Rispoli the coveted title of Master of Sacred Theology. He was only twenty-nine years old.

=== Academic posts ===
Such a success catapulted Rispoli to the highest ranks of learned Dominicans. Only a few months after his Paris disputation, in 1612, to show his delight in championing such a first rate scholar, and in respect towards his family, for all its worth Grand Master Alof de Wignacourt appointed him his personal theologian and consultor, and made him a familiar of the Order of Knights Hospitaller.

Upon terminating his studies in Paris in 1612, Rispoli was also on great demand at the many Studia Generali of the Dominican Order. That same year, the General Chapter of Paris appointed him Regent of Studies at the newly established Studium Generale of Messina, Sicily. Then, in 1613, not having yet completed his one-year assignment at Messina, the Provincial Chapter of Sicily, celebrated at Palermo, appointed him Regent at the Studium Generale of Palermo. He stayed at the Sicilian capital city up till 1617.

=== Accused of heresy ===
During his Regency at Palermo, between 1615 and 1616, he was accused before the Sicilian Inquisition of teaching heretical doctrines. The precise imputations against Rispoli are not known. It appears that the records of the Inquisition at Palermo have not survived the ravishes of time. However, it seems that Rispoli's accusers were numerous and powerful, and that the accusations were quite serious. Expenses for a defence lawyer were shared between Rispoli's religious communities at Palermo and at Vittoriosa.

The most heart-rending upshot of the incident was that, between May 1615 and July 1616, pending the charges, Rispoli was incarcerated at one of the Inquisition's dungeons for fourteen months. Eventually, his accusations were proved to be unfounded. He was thus declared not guilty, released, and, on July 15, 1616, reinstated to his former offices.

=== Reinstated ===
Having overcome this harrowing ordeal, Rispoli continued to hold the Regency at the Studium Generale of Palermo for another year. In 1617, after an absence of eighteen years, he was back to Malta as superior (of Vicar-General) of the Maltese Dominicans, and as official Visitor for the three Dominican Priories in Malta on behalf of the Sicilian Prior Provincial. During his stay in Malta, for one academic year (1617–18) Rispoli lectured at the Studium of the Portus Salutis Priory at Valletta, and, during the following academic year (1618–19), at the Dominican Studium of the Annunciation Priory at Vittoriosa. Here, at Vittoriosa, he was also chosen at Master of Studies, and elected Prior, offices he held up till 1623.

Grand Master Alof de Wignacourt attests to Rispoli's excellent conduct at the time. Already in 1617, when Rispoli returned to Malta, he immediately appointed him as his personal theologian and consultor. Now, two years later, he sent various letters to the Master of the Dominican Order and to the Prior Provincial of Sicily most probably to scotch current rumours about some alleged shortcomings on the part of Rispoli. The Grand Master referred to Rispoli's work and personal demeanour in glowing terms, praising his erudition and exemplary life, his prudence and charity shown in his administrative role, his good sense in the works and benefices with which he endowed the priory, and his high standards of strict observance within his religious community.

While at Vittoriosa between 1618 and 1620, Rispoli was also appointed Moderator and Consultor to the Inquisition in Malta. The appointment followed his earlier captivity for more than a year in the dungeons of the Sicilian Inquisition.

=== High activity ===
The latter years of Rispoli's life were rather hectic. He frequently had to travel by sea and land between and over Italy, France, Sicily and Malta, occupying a series of temporary abodes.

Rispoli left Malta for Italy in 1623 to take up the office of Regent of Studies at the college of San Sisto Vecchio in Rome, Italy. He stayed here for two years, until 1626. During this period, precisely in 1624, he was appointed by the Master of the Order, Seraphim Secchi, as Censor for a particular case dealing with a book, entitled Vox Turturis (A Dove's Voice), by the Dominican Dominic Gravina. In 1626, Rispoli was back to Malta for a few months once more as Vicar-General of the Maltese Dominicans, and as official Visitor for the three Dominican Priories in Malta.

In November of this year he was back in Rome, probably as Socius (or Assistant) to the Master of the Order. At the end of 1626 the Archbishop of Osimo, Italy, Augustine Galamini (who, one might recall, had presided as Master of the Dominican Order over Rispoli's disputation at Paris in May 1611; he had been created Cardinal in August 1611, and Archbishop of Osimo in April 1920), requested that Rispoli serves as his Vicar-General. This appointment probably lasted until 1629.

During this period, it appears that Rispoli was not residing continually at Osimo. In 1628 he attended the General Chapter of the Dominican Order at Toulouse, France, as Definitor. The following year he preached at Macerata, Italy. In May 1930, Rispoli was appointed by the Master of the Dominican Order to act as Commissioner to restore regular life at the priory at Messina, Sicily. On April 21, 1630, he was than appointed for the third time Vicar-General of the Maltese Dominicans, and as official Visitor for the three Dominican Priories in Malta. He stayed in Malta until 1632.

In that year, precisely on May 22, 1632, Rispoli was once more appointed Regent of Studies at Palermo, Sicily. However, he did not take up office until September, apparently because the Sicilian Prior Provincial had found some objection in the appointment He stayed in office until 1936, when he returned to Malta, once more as Vicar-General of the Maltese Dominicans, and as official Visitor for the three Dominican Priories in Malta on behalf of the Sicilian Prior Provincial. During this period, Rispoli also lectured in Holy Scripture and morals at the Cathedral of Mdina, Malta. In 1638, Rispoli was elected Prior of the community at Valletta. This was his last assignment in Malta.

=== Death ===
In March 1639, Rispoli was in Catania, Sicily, where he went to preach Lenten sermons at the cathedral. It seems that, during the rough 93 km crossing between Malta and Sicily, he caught an ugly chill. Unwilling to rest or take time to convalescent, Rispoli plod through the sermons of the first couple of days. On April 1, after the appointed sermon, he feverishly took to bed unable to rise again. His condition worsened during the night, and died the day after, on April 2, 1639.

His funeral in Catania was held four days later (April 6). Though technically just a simple friar, Rispoli was given a state funeral in everything but name. Chroniclers were impressed by the multitude of people, both common and dignitaries, who attended his service and interment. He was buried at the Dominican church of St. Catherine, Catania, in a grave reserved for all friars. Unfortunately, in the subsequent years, through war and natural disasters, the church was destroyed, and the burial place lost. Today, only the original plaque which covered the grave still exists.

== Posthumous recognition ==
Considering the outstanding intellectual and personal qualities of Rispoli, relatively little academic attention has been given to him, and much less to his philosophy. The only genuine biographical research carried out on original sources was done by Daniel Callus in the 1920s. Subsequent scholars heavily relied on his work, adding here and there some further unsubstantial information. Unfortunately, in general the academia ignored Rispoli, perhaps considering him just another withered mediaeval scholastic who, apart from some historical value, had no particular consequence or philosophical relevance to contemporary discussions.

Rispoli's works have never been meticulously or systematically studied. None of them have ever been translated, in part or in whole, into a modern language, let alone freshly read and studied. Indeed, the translation of his works, or even the transliteration of his manuscripts, is riddled with logistical problems. Most of the manuscripts (perhaps excluding the Commentaria of 1633) are written in a minuscule, mostly indecipherable, handwriting. Furthermore, they are peppered with inscrutable abbreviations. Of course, all of this does not apply to his Status Controversiæ of 1609, which is his only extant printed text, and which might possibly contain the best of his philosophy and originality.

As Rispoli's personality continues to attract attention, the eventual study of his philosophy is not a forlorn prospect.

== Works ==
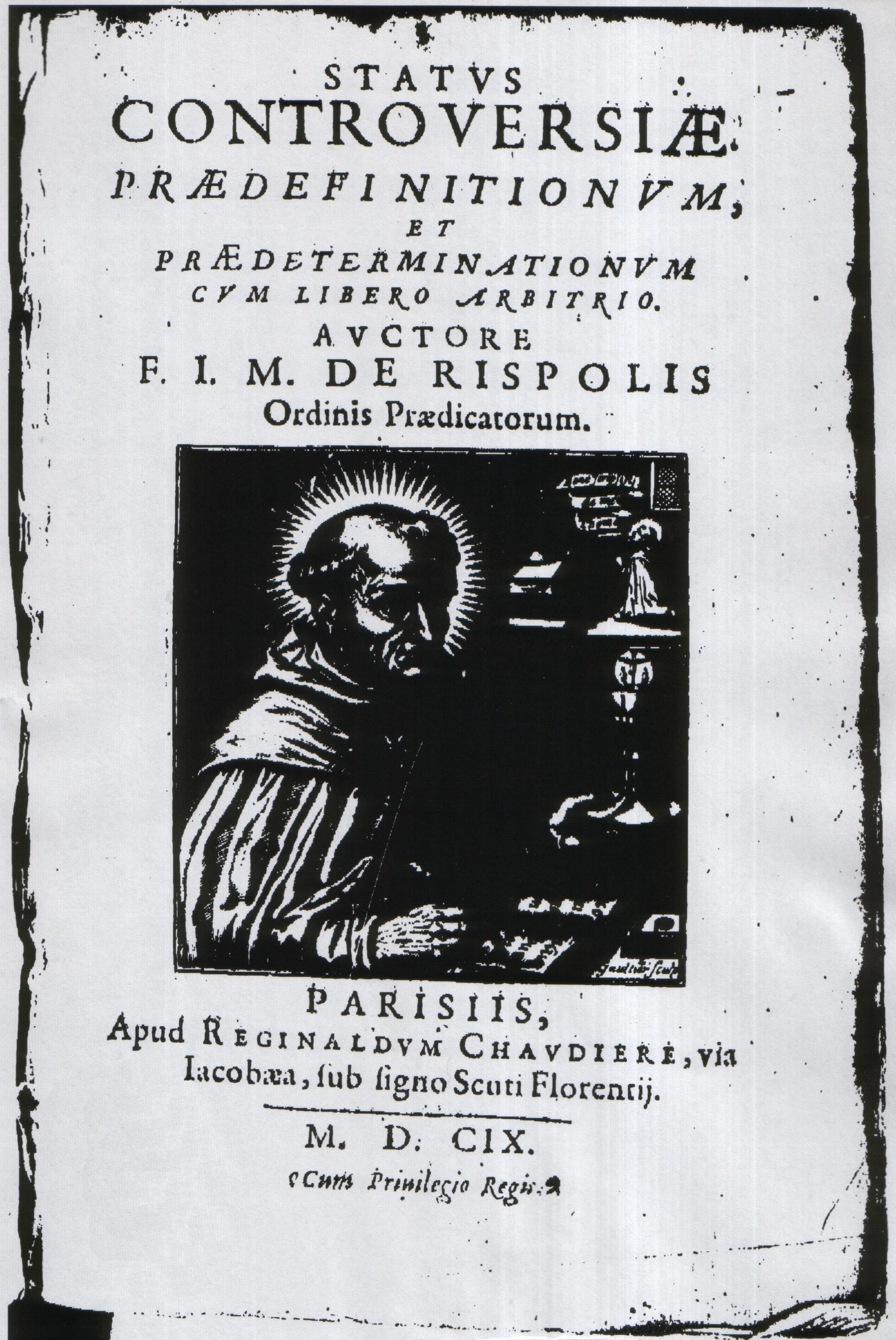
Frontispiece of Rispoli's 1609 magnum opus

All of Rispoli's works attest to his Aristotelian-Thomist type of philosophy. Basically, Aristotle and Thomas Aquinas are his main sources, and his writing style is heavily influenced by the method of composition proper to Scholasticism. For this reason, most of his works are organised into 'Books', 'Chapters', 'Questions', and 'Conclusions'. Rispoli's extant writings are sixteen in all. They are of three types: (1) one published book; (2) fourteen endorsed manuscripts; and (3) one authored manuscript.

=== Published book ===
Rispoli published just one book in his lifetime, and that was at the beginning of his academic and intellectual career. Copies of the publication are extremely rare. Two are known to exist, one is at the Dominican Archive at Rabat, Malta, and another at the Bibliothèque Nationale de France in Paris, France.

- 1609 – Status Controversiæ Prædefinitionum et Prædeterminationum cum Libero Arbitrio (The State of the Question dealing with the Predefinition and the Predestination of Free Will). The book, in Latin, was published on June 15, 1609, by Reginald Chaudière, Paris. It contains twenty-two introductory pages (Roman numbering) and 424 body pages (Arabic numbering), and measures 17 cm x 10.5 cm. It was published cum privilegio Regis (by appointment of the King).

=== Endorsed manuscripts ===
These fourteen manuscripts are all held at the Dominican Archive at Rabat, Malta. They were put in writing by a cleric, John Mary Camilleri, who attended Rispoli's lectures, and presumably sanctioned for their accuracy by Rispoli himself (for they were in his possession). Some of the lectures were read at the Dominican Studium of the Portus Salutis Priory at Valletta, Malta, and others at the Dominican Studium of the Annunciation Priory at Vittoriosa, Malta. They are the following:

- c.1617 – Tractatus Summularum (A Short Treatise on Logic).
- 1617 – Expositio Librorum Prædicabilium (An Exposition on Aristotle's 'Categories').
- 1617 – In Aristotelis Prædicamenta Expositio (An Exposition on Aristotle's 'Categories').
- 1617 – In Libros Posteriorum Aristotelis Expositio (An Exposition on Aristotle's 'Posterior Analytics').
- 1618/19 – Quæstiones in Libros De Anima (Themes related to Aristotle's 'On the Soul').
- 1618 – Subtilissima Expositio In Octo Libros Aristotelis Physicorum (A Detailed Exposition on the Eight Books of Aristotle's 'Physics').
- 1619 – Expositio In Libros Aristotelis De Generatione et Corruptione (An Exposition on the Books of Aristotle's 'On Coming-To-Be and Passing Away').
- 1619 – Expositio in Tractatum De Ente et Essentia Divi Thomæ (An Exposition on Aquinas' Treatise 'On Being and Essence').
- c.1631 – Summa Totius Logicae (An Anthology on Logic).
- c.1631 – Comentarium in Libros De Anima (A Commentary on the Books of Aristotle's 'On the Soul').
- c.1631 – Tractatus De Sensibus (A Treatise on the Senses).
- c.1631 – Tractatus De Potentia (A Treatise on Potency).
- c.1631 – Liber Primus De Generatione (On the First Book of Aristotle's 'On Coming-To-Be and Passing Away').
- c.1631 – Summa Librorum Physicorum (An Anthology on Physics).

=== Authored work ===
This manuscript was discovered by Mark Montebello in 1992, and as yet remains the last of Rispoli's work to be located. It is held at the Commune Library of the Municipality of Palermo in Sicily. The special and precious feature of this document is that it is the only manuscript personally penned down by Rispoli himself.

- 1633 – Commentaria in Primam Partem Divi Thomæ (A Commentary on the First Part of Aquinas' 'Summa Theologiæ').

== See also ==
- Philosophy in Malta
