= Grabmann =

Grabmann is a German surname. Notable people with the surname include:

- Martin Grabmann (1875–1949), German Catholic priest and historian
- Walter Grabmann (1905–1992), German Luftwaffe general
