= Jacek Woroniecki =

Polish Dominican priest and philosopher (1878–1949)

Servant of God Jacek Woroniecki OP
- Portrait, circa 1927
- Born: Adam Marian Tomasz Pius Leon Woroniecki; 21 December 1878; Lublin, Poland
- Died: 18 May 1949 (aged 70); Kraków, Poland

Adam Marian Tomasz Pius Leon duke Korybut Woroniecki, religious name Jacek (21 December 1878 – 18 May 1949) was a Polish Dominican priest, theologian, professor of ethics, scholastic philosopher, and rector of the Catholic University of Lublin from 1922 to 1924.

== Biography ==
Woroniecki was born on 21 December 1878 in Lublin to Mieczysław and Maria Woroniecki (née Drohojowska). As a youth, he was stated to have influenced the conversion of an English Quaker. He graduated from a Russian gymnasium in Warsaw in 1898, attaining the rank of warrant officer. After serving one year in the Grodno hussar regiment, he attended the University of Fribourg, obtaining a bachelor's degree in natural science in 1902. Under the spiritual guidance of Honorat Koźmiński, he began studying theology, obtaining a bachelor's degree in theology from the University in 1905. That same year, he began attending the diocesan seminary in Lublin; he was ordained a priest on 10 March 1906 by Franciszek Jaczewski.

Until 1907, Woroniecki served as chaplain and secretary to bishop Jaczewski; he also lectured in scripture and catechesis at the seminary in Lublin, while serving as a catechist at a grammar school. He then returned to the University of Fribourg to continue his studies, obtaining a doctorate in theology in 1909 with his dissertation, Les principes fondamentaux de la sociologie thomiste. After obtaining his doctorate, he entered the Dominican Order and begun his novitiate at the Convent of San Domenico, taking his solemn vows in 1911 and adopting the religious name Jacek. He served as chaplain and vice-rector of a boarding school at Fribourg between 1911 and 1913, lecturer of ethics at the Dominican studium generale in Kraków between 1914 and 1915, and professor of philosophy at the University of Fribourg between 1916 and 1919.

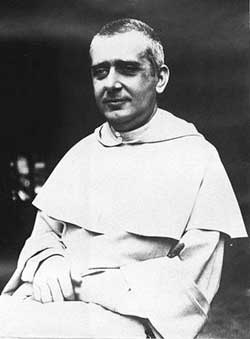
Photograph of Woroniecki

In 1918, Woroniecki was invited by Idzi Radziszewski to lecture at the Catholic University of Lublin. Between 1919 and 1929, he would lecture in moral theology, ethics and pedagogy, as well as the methodology of religious education. He also served as rector of the University between 1922 and 1924, and later as vice-rector between 1928 and 1929. In 1929, he went to the Pontifical University of Saint Thomas Aquinas, where he lectured in moral theology and pedagogy until 1933. Returning to Poland, he became rector of the Dominican studium generale in Lviv, where he lectured in paterology, asceticism and ecclesiastical history. He also helped to establish a studium generale in Warsaw, becoming its rector in 1937.

In 1939, Woroniecki was nominated as rector and lecturer of moral theology of the Dominican Philosophical and Theological College in Kraków; due to failing health, he would eventually withdraw from the College in 1944, devoting himself entirely to writing. He died on 18 May 1949 of a heart attack, and was buried at Rakowice Cemetery. His remains were transferred to St. Hyacinth's Church seven years after his death, in 1956.

== Cause for beatification ==
Efforts to begin Woroniecki's cause for beatification began in the late 20th century, led by Maurycy Niedziela, who served as his postulator. The diocesan investigation was opened in the Archdiocese of Kraków on 7 December 2004, lasting until 27 February 2023.
