= Tommaso da Modena =

Italian painter (1326–1379)

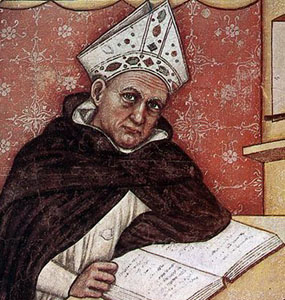
St Albertus Magnus O.P, painted by Tomaso da Modena in 1352.

Tomaso Barisini, better known as Tommaso da Modena and sometimes called Tomaso Baffini (1326 – 1379) was an Italian painter of the mid-14th century.

== Biography ==
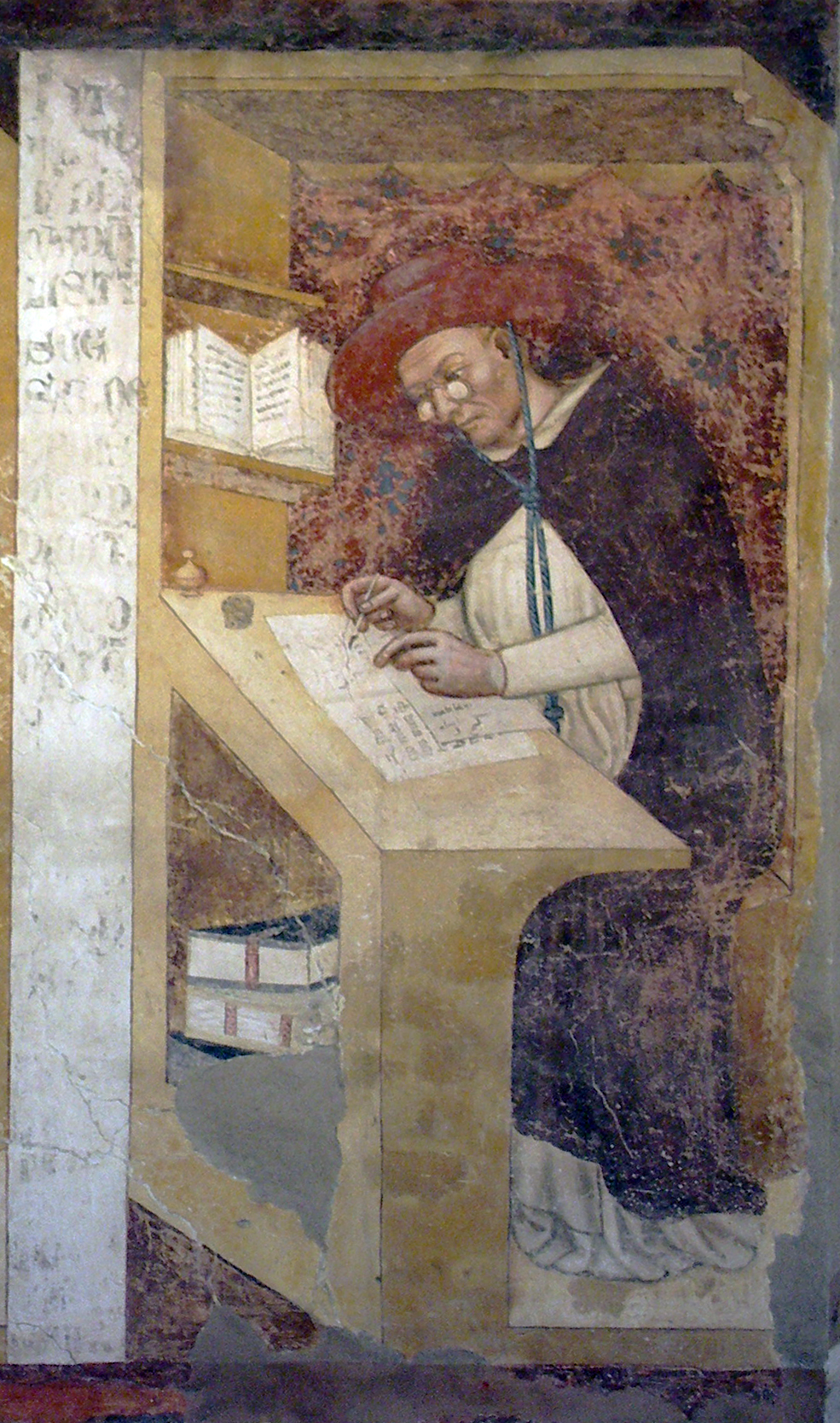
Portrait of Hugh of Saint-Cher, 1352

Tommaso trained in Venice and worked mostly in Northern Italy, but also worked for the court of the Emperor Charles IV in Prague.

In Karlstein Castle, two pictures on wood are attributed to him, an Ecce Homo and a Madonna. A St Catherine is in the Gallerie dell'Accademia in Venice.

Perhaps Tommaso's most important work was done in Treviso.

In 1352, as an expression of the Dominican intellectual vocation, Tommaso was commissioned to paint a fresco cycle of 40 Dominicans scholars at their desks including Popes, Cardinals, theologians, and philosophers. The work is in the chapter room of the former Dominican convent of San Nicolo' at Treviso, now a seminary. Among others, the cycle portrays Cardinal Annibale Annibaldi, Doctor of the Church Thomas Aquinas, Cardinal Hugh Aycelin, and Cardinal Latino Malabranca Orsini, all of whom were professors of the Dominican studium at Santa Sabina the forerunner of the Pontifical University of Saint Thomas Aquinas, Angelicum, as well as Bishop and Doctor of the Church Albert the Great, founder of the Dominican studium at Cologne, and renowned biblical commentator Cardinal Hugh of Saint-Cher. The portrait of Saint-Cher is the earliest known depiction of a person wearing spectacles.

A large early Renaissance fresco cycle in the church of Santa Margherita degli Eremitani was rescued from demolition in 1882. It was restored and is now on display in the Treviso Civic Museum.

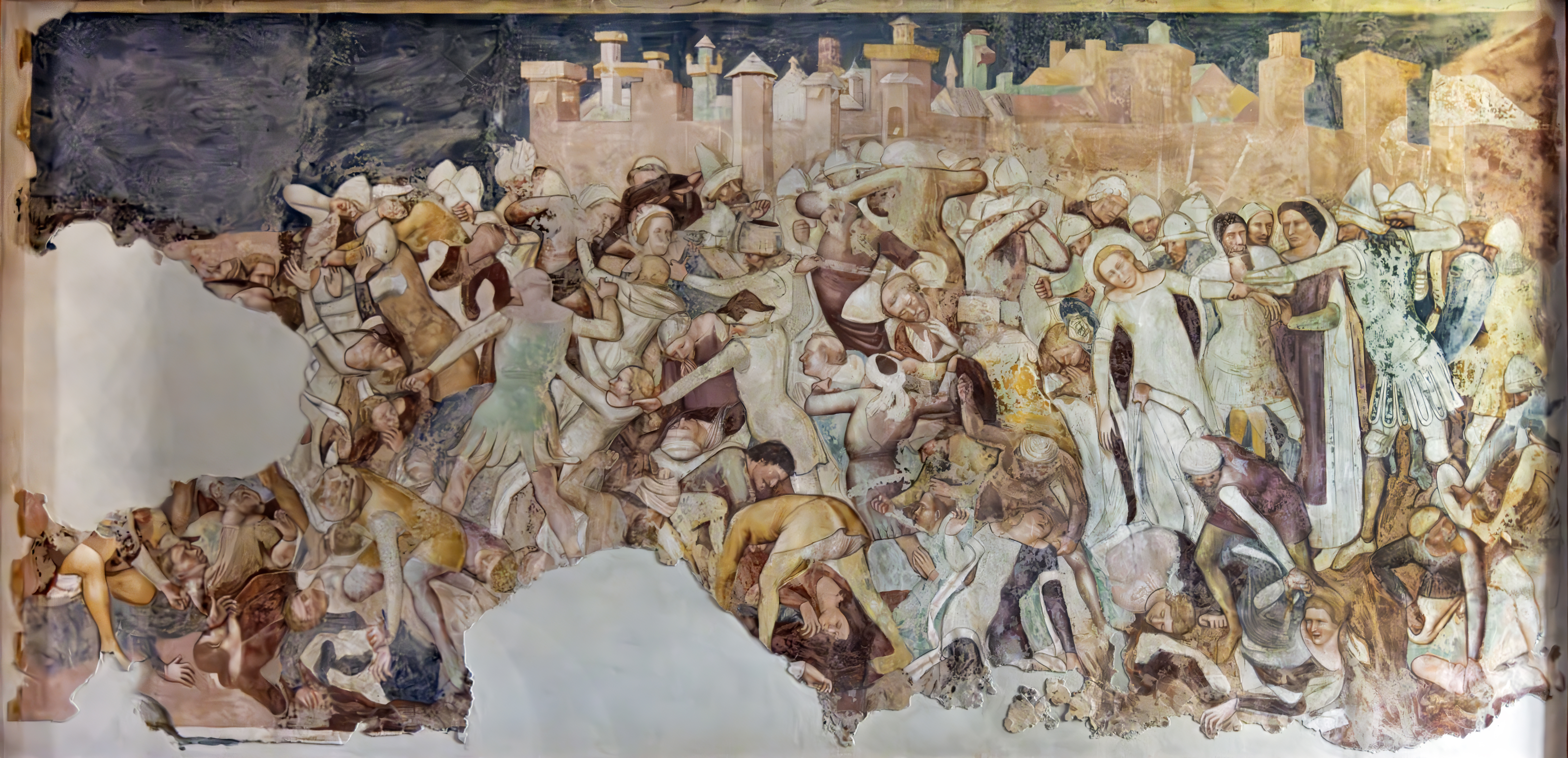
Stories of Saint Ursula - Martyrdom - Civic Museum, Treviso

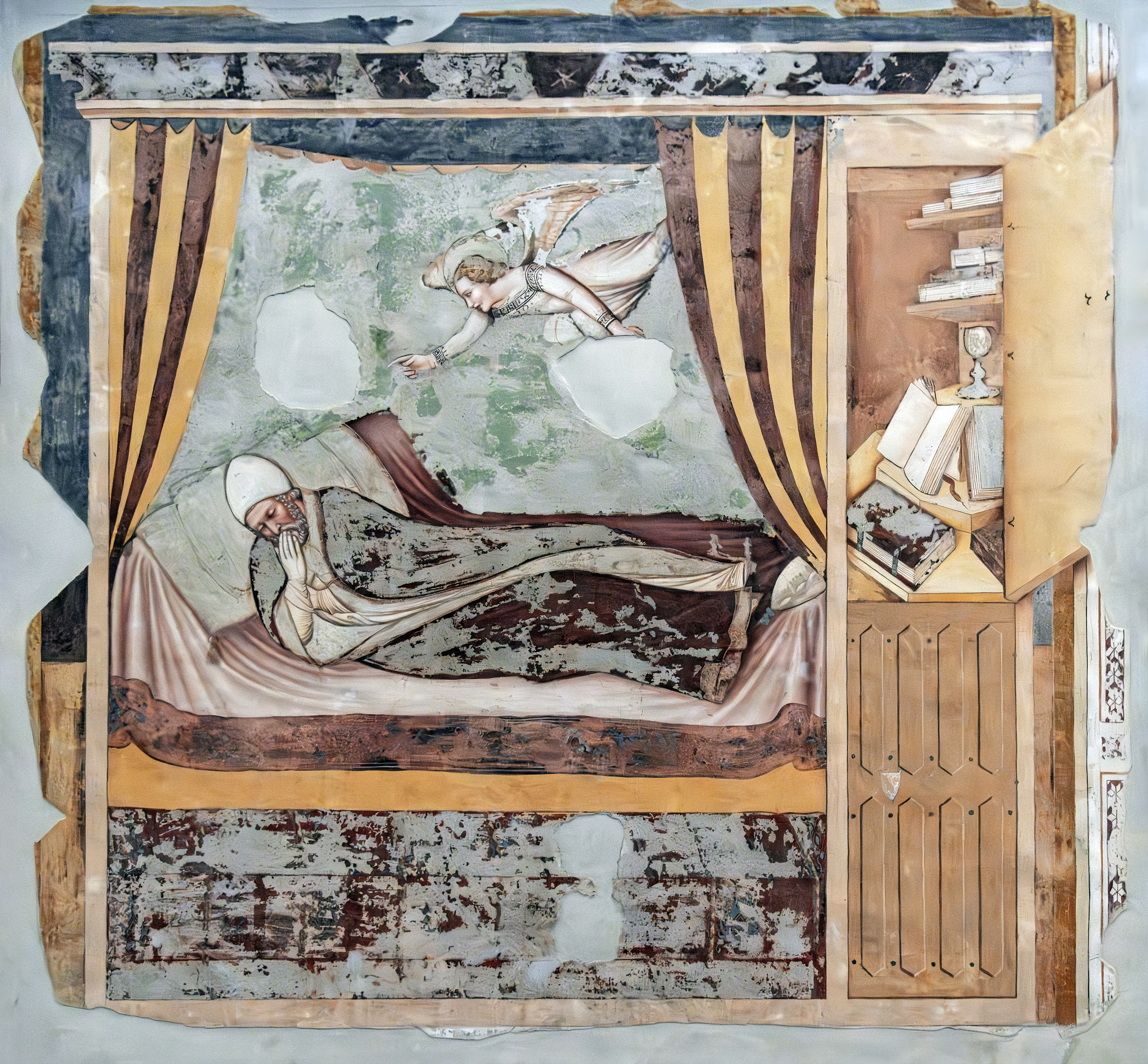
stories of Saint Ursula - The Pope's dream - Civic Museum, Treviso

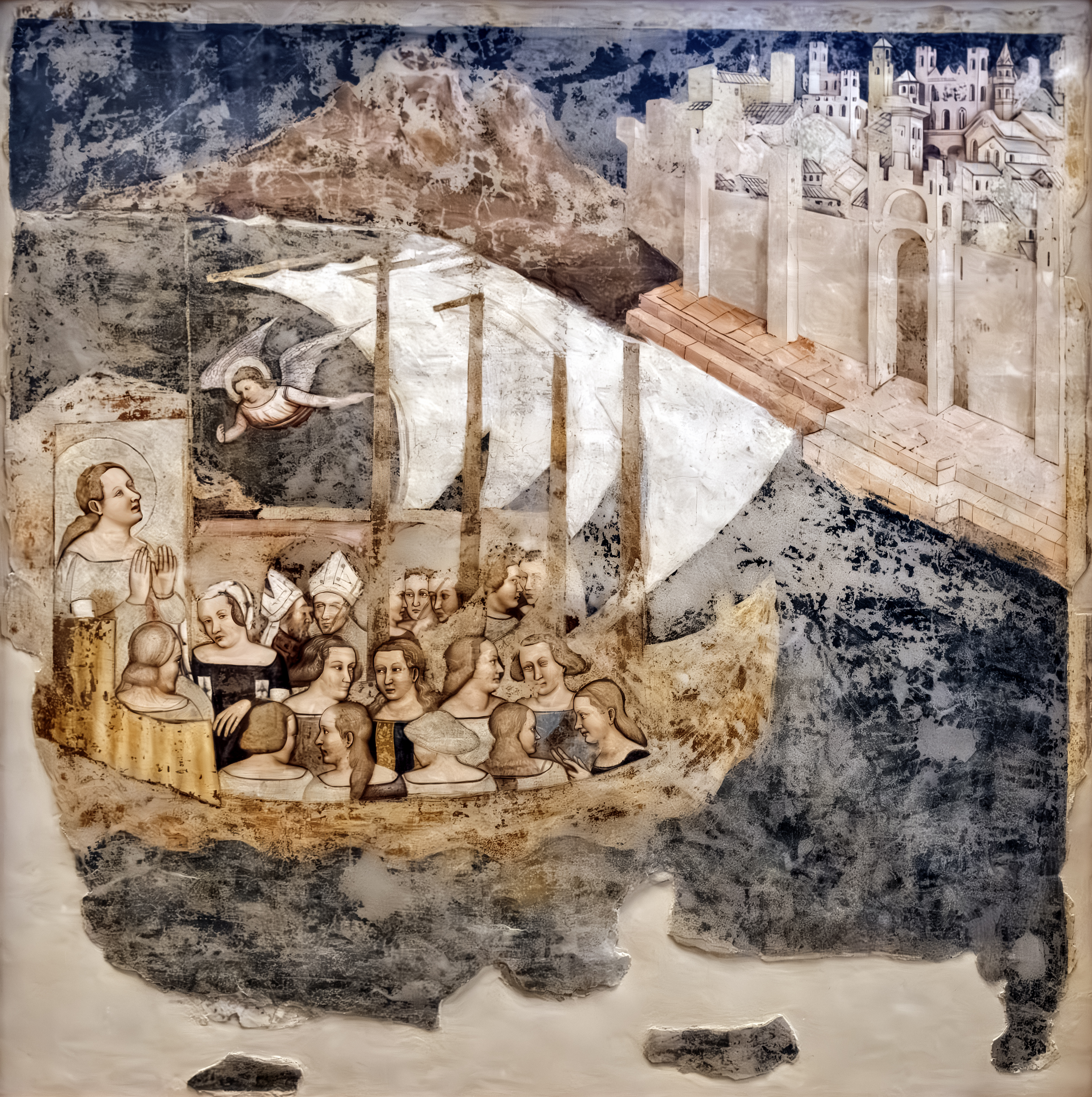
stories of Saint Ursula - Navigation towards Rome - Civic Museum, Treviso

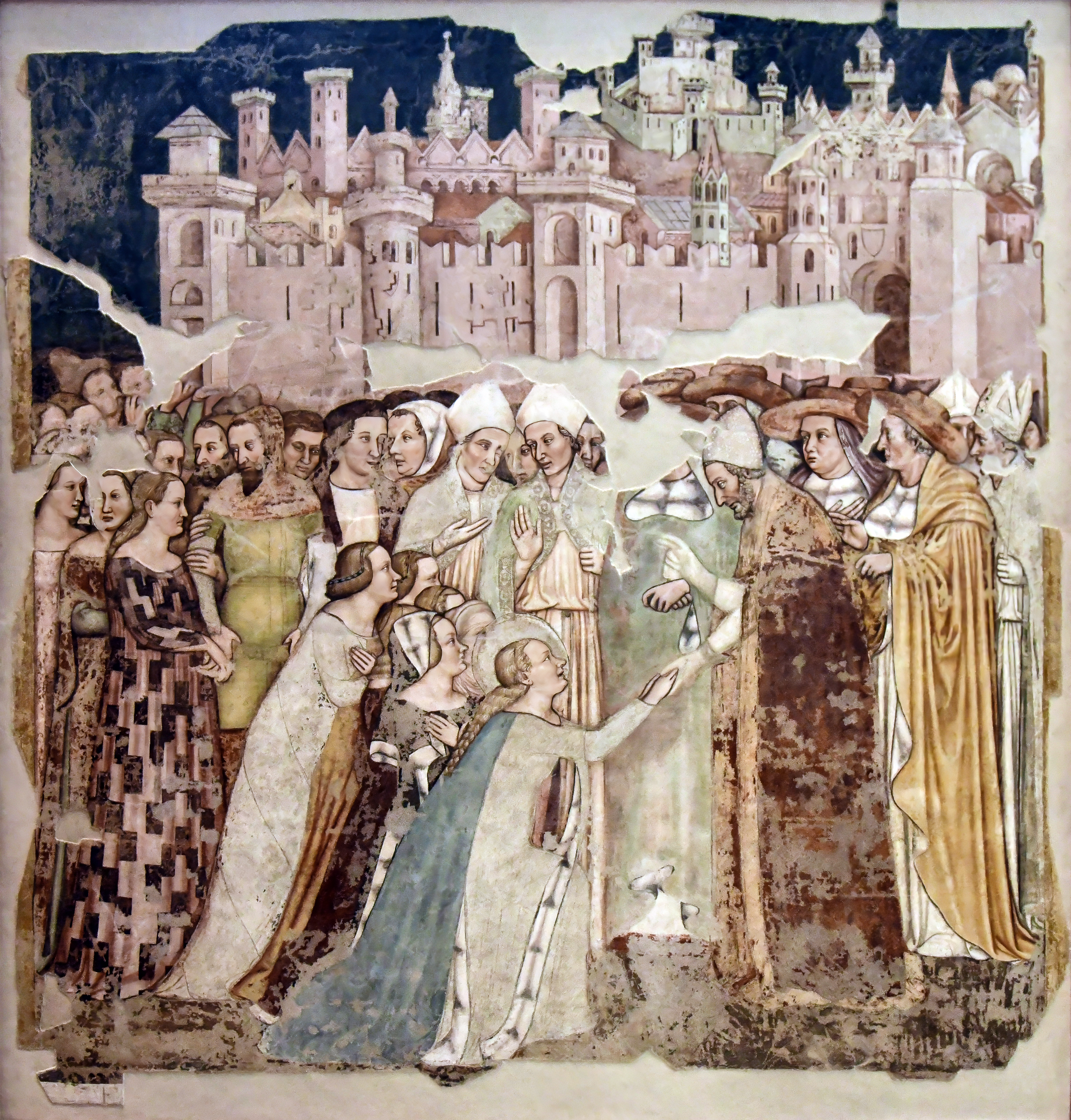
Stories of Saint Ursula - Ursula's meeting with the Pope in Rome - Civic Museum, Treviso

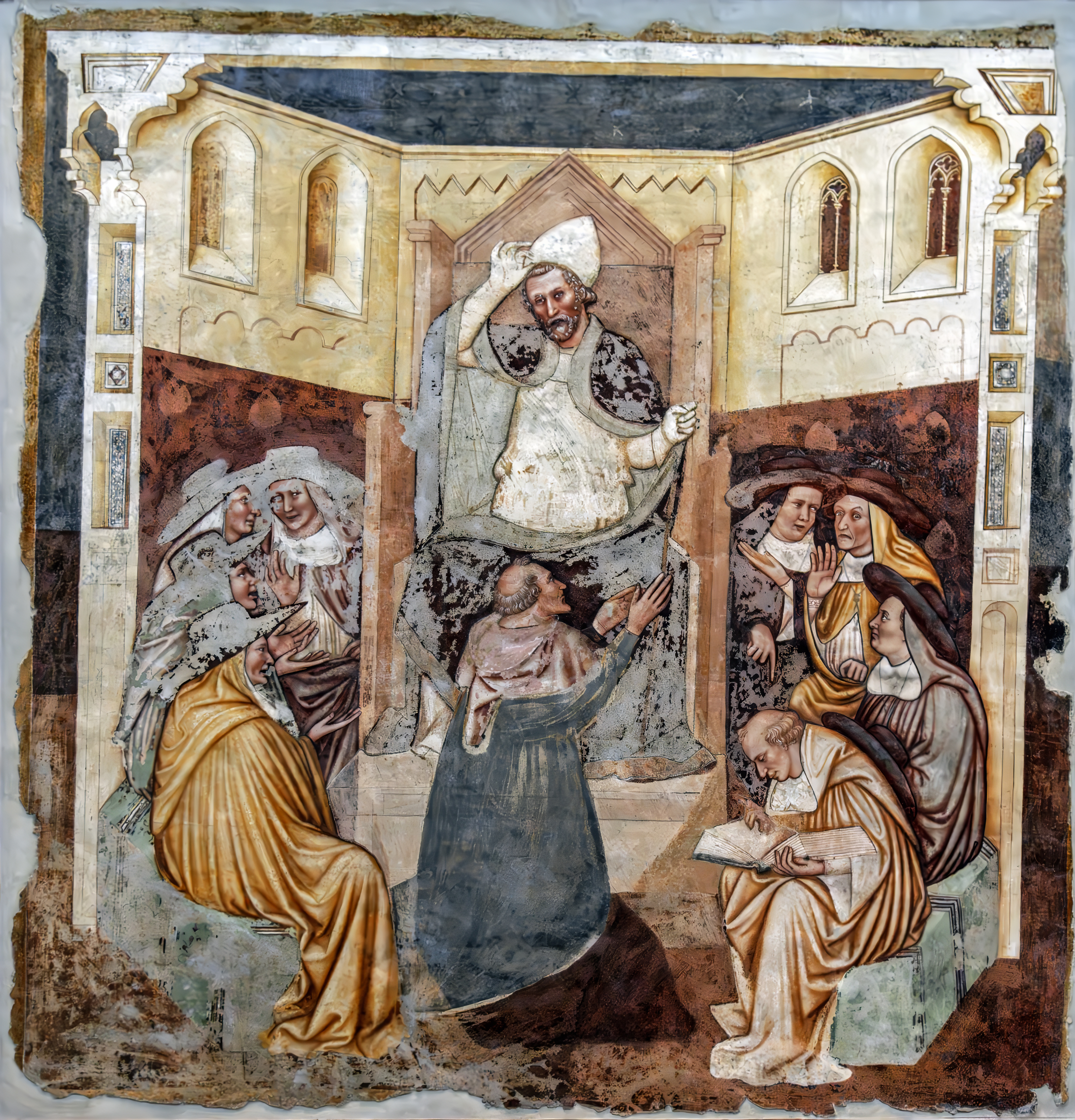
Stories of Saint Ursula - The abdication of the Pope - Civic Museum, Treviso

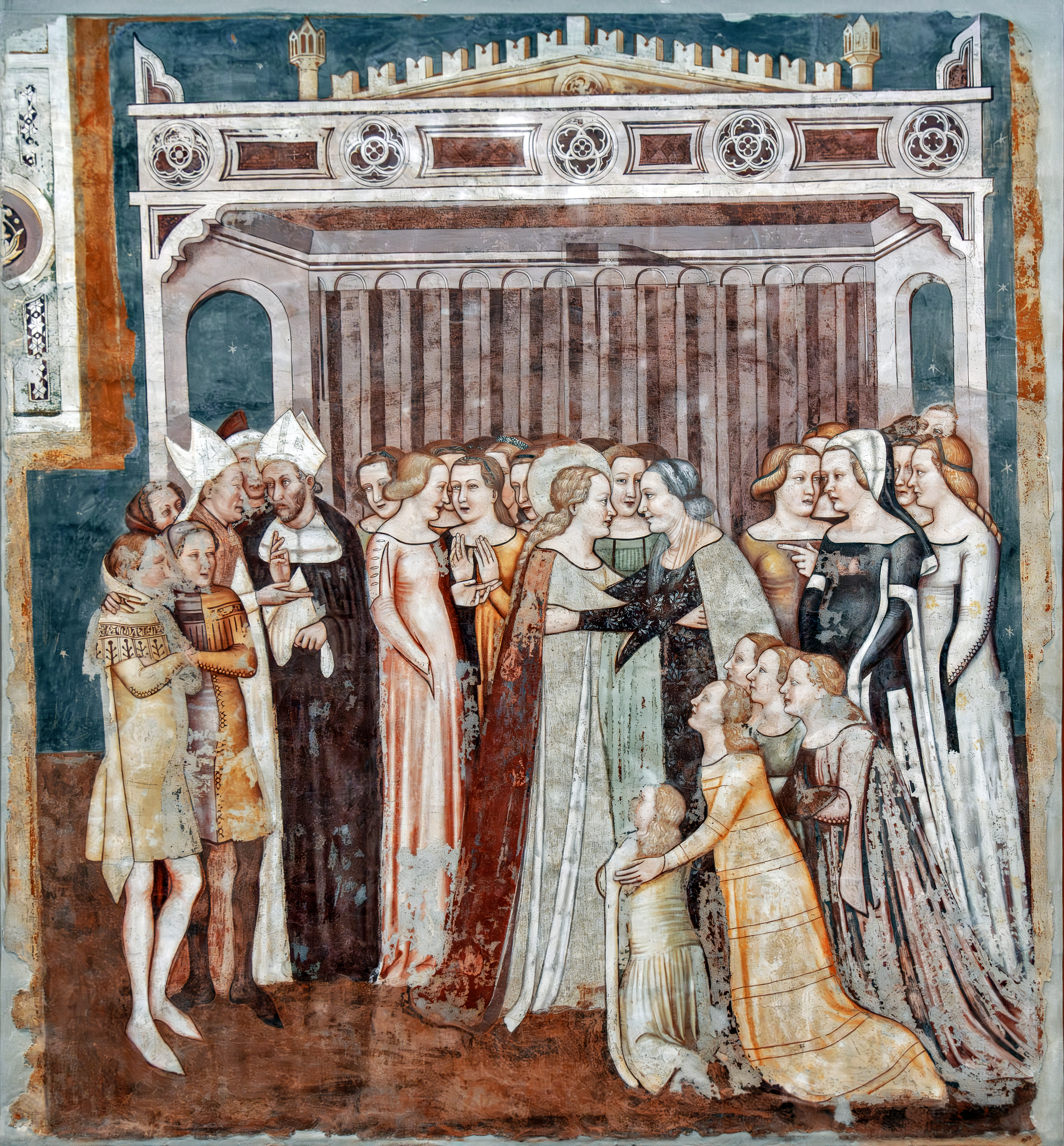
Stories of Saint Ursula - Orsola's farewell to her mother - Civic Museum, Treviso

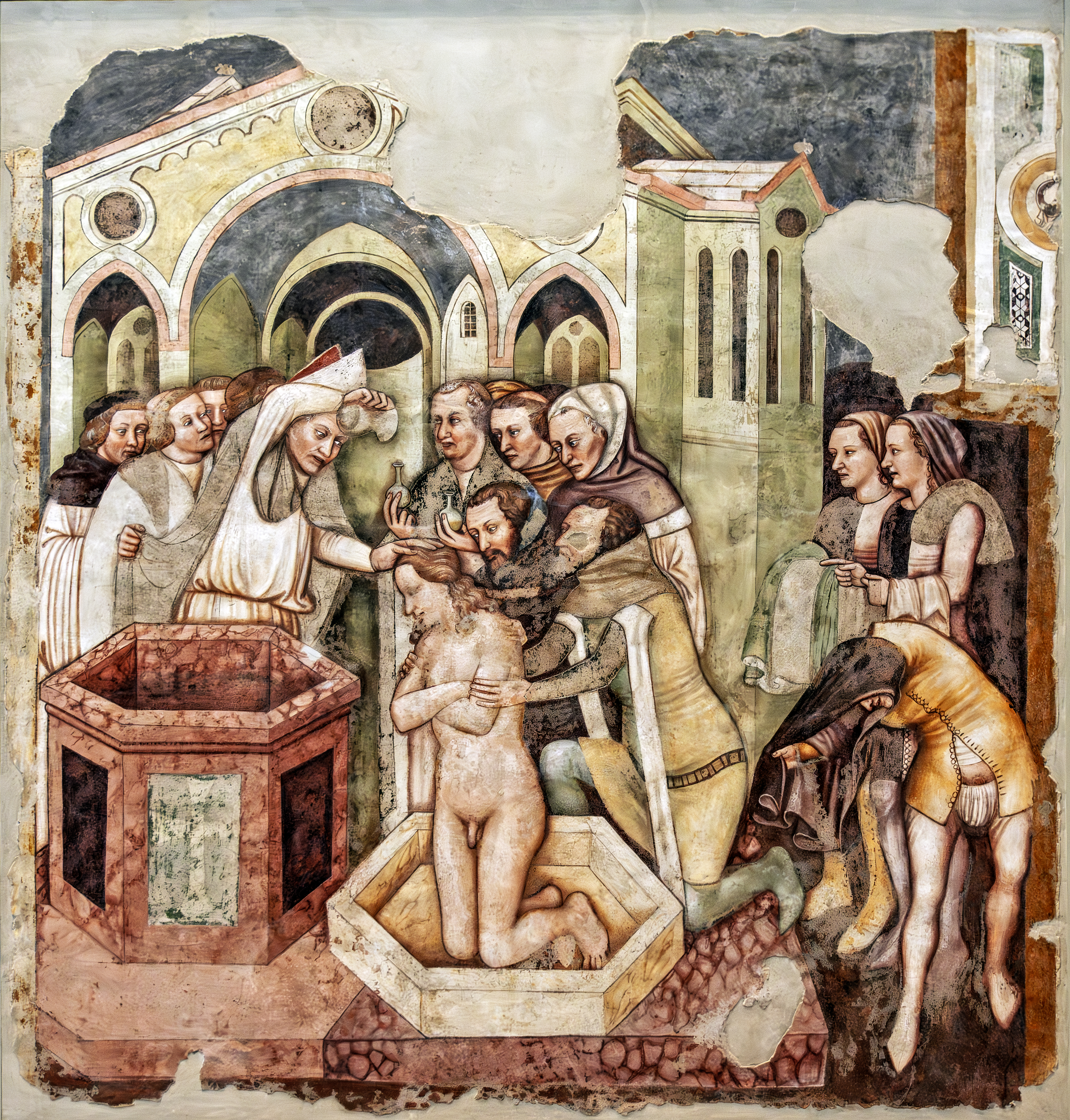
Stories of Saint Ursula - Baptism of the Prince of England - Civic Museum, Treviso

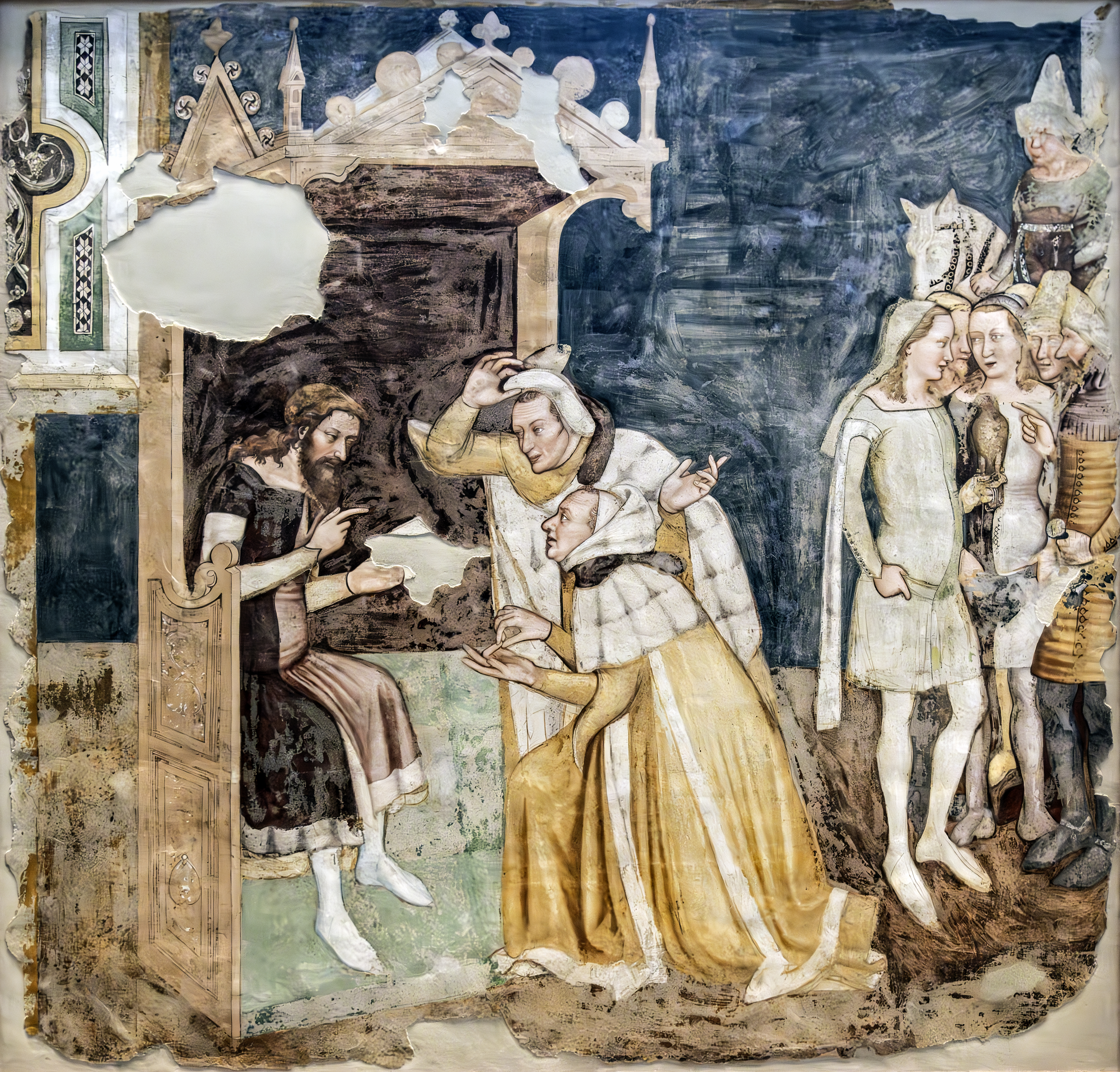
Stories of Saint Ursula - The sending of the ambassadors of the King of England - Civic Museum, Treviso

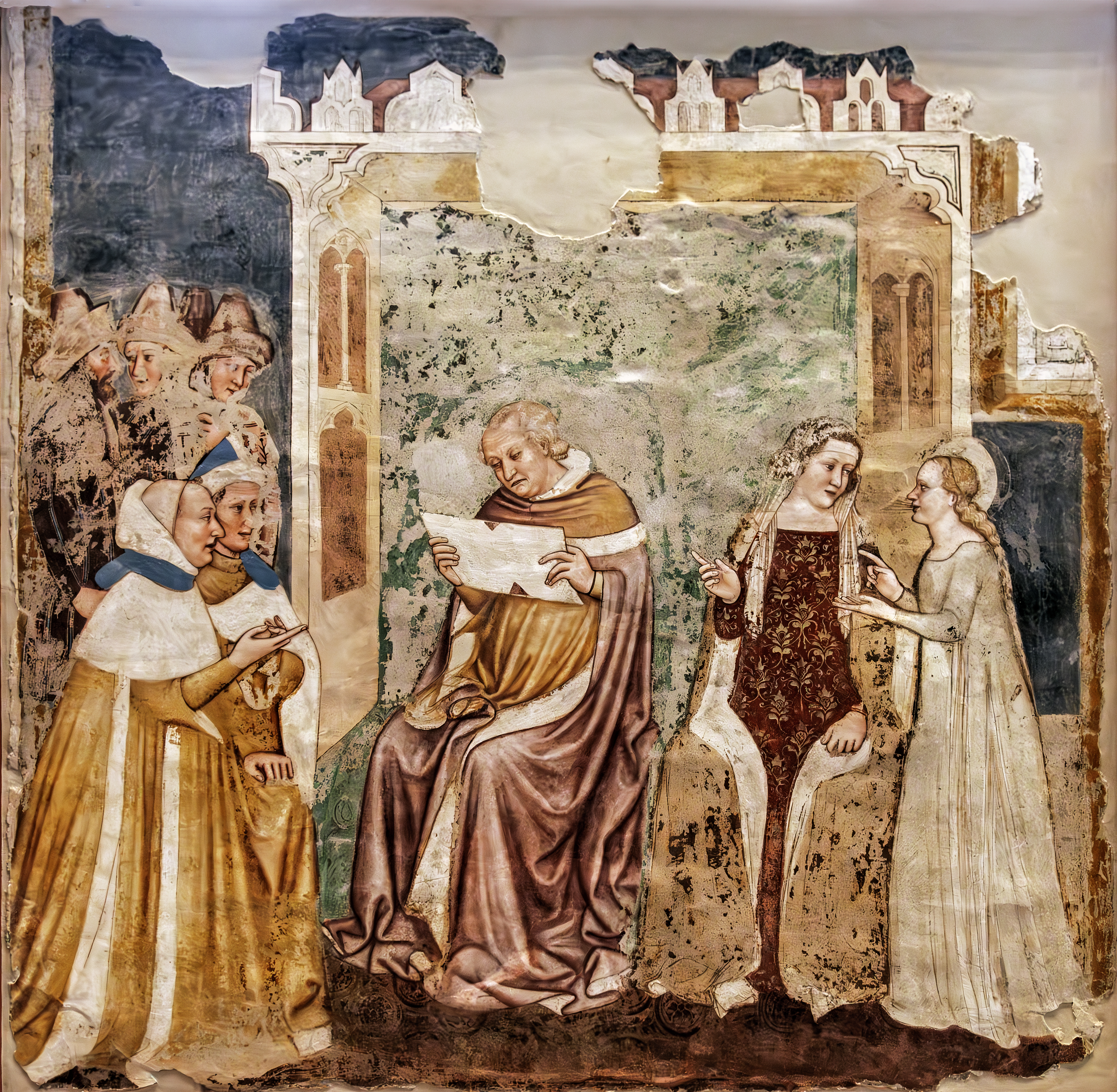
Stories of Saint Ursula - The English ambassadors to the King of Brittany - Civic Museum, Treviso

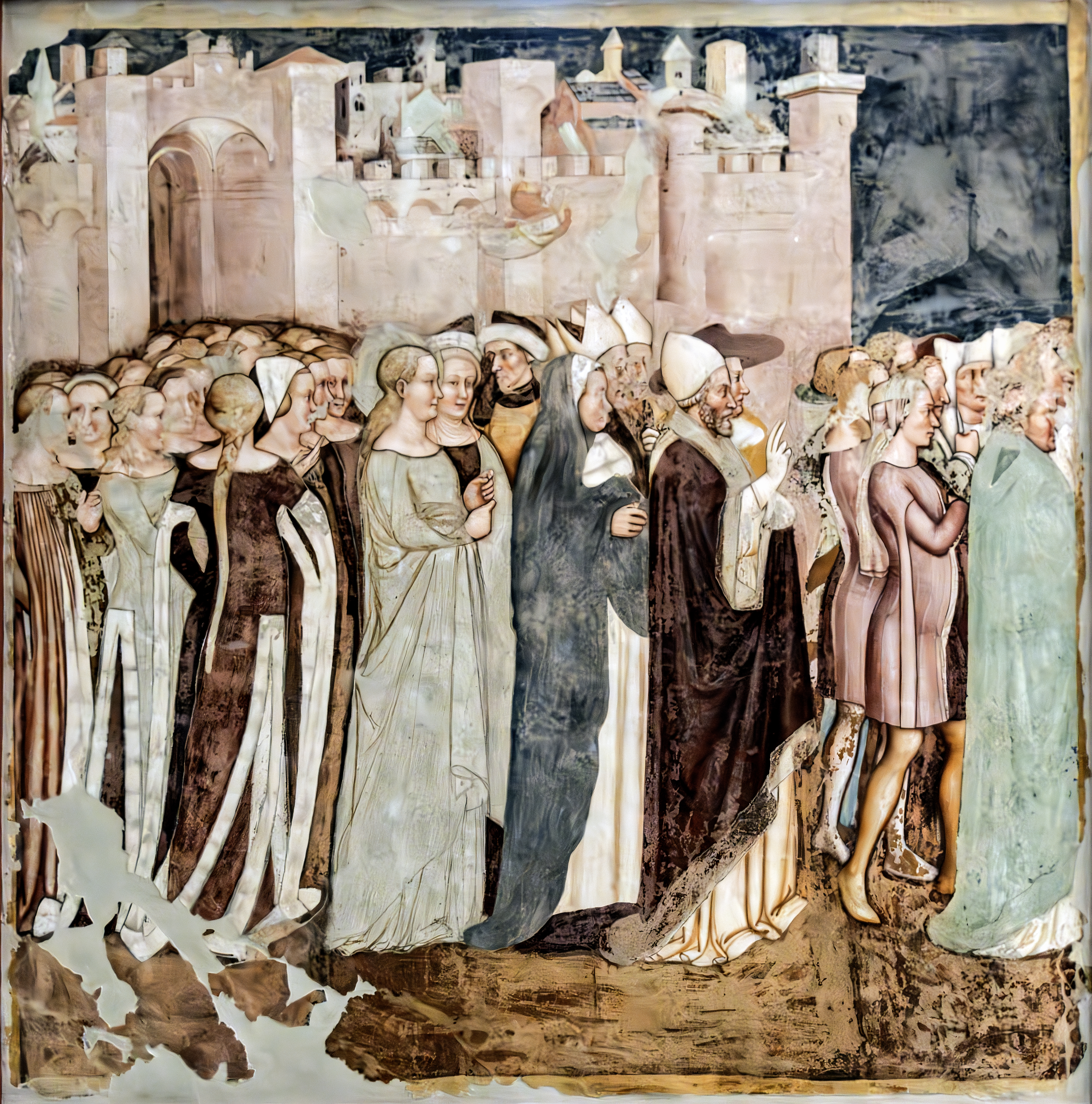
Stories of Saint Ursula - The departure from Rome - Civic Museum, Treviso

== Sources ==
- Farquhar, Maria (1855). Ralph Nicholson Wornum (ed.). Biographical catalogue of the principal Italian painters. London: Woodfall & Kinder. p. 107.
