= Annibaldo Annibaldi =

Italian Catholic theologian

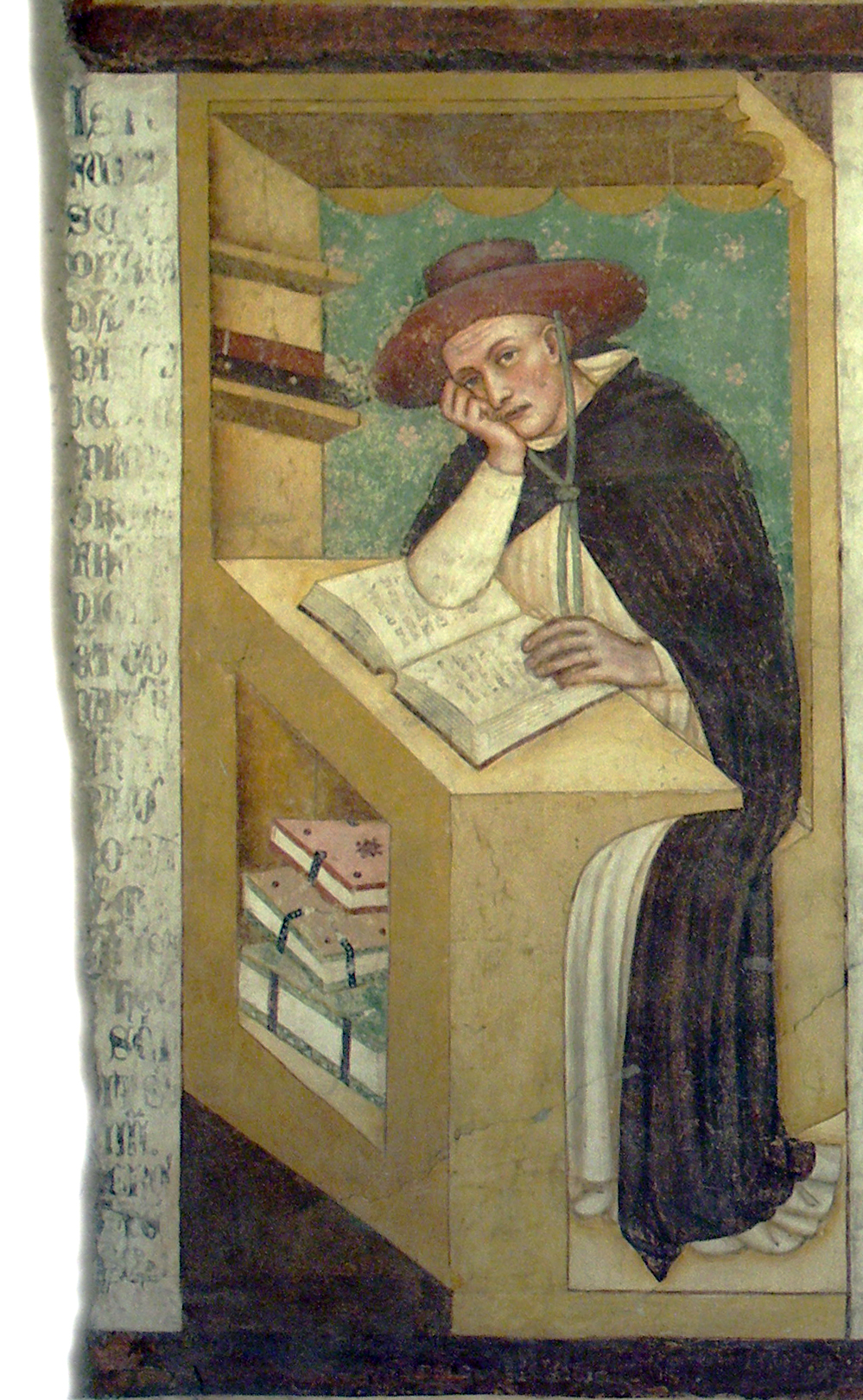
Portrait of Annibaldo Annibaldi

Annibaldo Annibaldi, also known as Annibaldo degli Annibaldi (died 1 September 1271), was an Italian Catholic theologian,

== Formation ==
Annibaldo was born into the Roman baronial family known as the Annibaldi, early in the 13th century.

Annibaldo joined the Dominican Order at an early age. He was an alumnus of Santa Sabina studium conventuale, the first studium of the Dominican Order at Rome, and the progenitor of the Pontifical University of Saint Thomas Aquinas, Angelicum. Later he was sent to the studium generale at Paris c. 1255 to become a master.

== Career ==
At Paris Annibaldo formed an intimate friendship with St. Thomas Aquinas and succeeded him as regent of studies at the Convent of St. Jacques. After teaching in Paris for some years, he was called to Rome in 1246 by Innocent IV to fill the post of Master of the Sacred Palace. He served in this capacity under Popes Alexander IV and Urban IV, the latter of whom created him Cardinal in 1262. When Clement IV, in 1265, handed over the Kingdom of the Two Sicilies to Charles I of Anjou, Annibale was put at the head of the commission empowered to treat with the monarch and register his agreement to the papal stipulations. The King received the insignia of investiture in Rome from the hands of the Cardinal. On 6 January 1266, Annibale anointed and solemnly crowned Charles I in the Lateran Church in Rome, the Pope being detained in Perugia. During the vacancy succeeding the death of Clement IV, Annibale received and treated with Philip III of France and Charles I at Viterbo (1270). During a papal mission at Orvieto, the Cardinal died, and, by his own request, was buried in the Church of San Domenico.

He was held in high esteem during life for his learning and virtues. Aquinas dedicated his Catena Aurea to him. Annibale, besides several small theological treatises now lost, wrote a commentary on the "Sentences", and "Quod libeta", which has been ascribed to St. Thomas, and published with his works even as recently as the Paris edition of 1889, by Frette. A manuscript in the Carmelite monastery in Paris calls Annibale a Carmelite who later became a Cistercian abbot. But Jacques Echard shows that no man of that name belonged to either order in the twelfth or thirteenth century.
