= University of Arezzo =

- Type: Studium generale
- Active: 1215–1520
- Location: Arezzo, Tuscany, Italy

The University of Arezzo (Studium Aretino) was an Italian university founded in 1215 that is located in the town of Arezzo in the Tuscan region of Italy. It was recognised as a studium generale from early in the 13th century but declined in importance after being overtaken by newer Italian universities and closed in 1520. The University of Siena has operated a branch campus in Arezzo since 1969.
