= Daniel Callus =

Maltese historian and philosopher (1888–1965)

- Born: January 20, 1888; Żebbuġ, Malta
- Died: May 26, 1965 (aged 77); Attard, Malta
- Occupations: History, Philosophy

Academic work
- Doctoral students: Jean Dunbabin

Daniel Callus (1888–1965) was a Maltese historian and philosopher. His main interest was in the history of medieval philosophy.

== Life ==
=== Beginnings ===
Callus was born at Żebbuġ, Malta, on January 20, 1888.

=== Formation ===
Callus joined the Dominicans in 1903 at 15 years of age, and studied with them at Rabat, Malta (1905–08). In 1906, after receiving his Minor Orders, he was sent to Fiesole, Italy, to pursue his studies there. Four years later, in 1910, he obtained the degree of Lector in Theology and Philosophy from the University of Florence. At the same university Callus undertook studies in philosophy, history of art, and Semitic languages.

In 1910 Callus was sent to Rome where he was ordained to the priesthood on November 6 and pursued postgraduate studies at the Angelicum in Rome, the future Pontifical University of Saint Thomas Aquinas, Angelicum.

In 1912 Callus was assigned to Rabat, Malta where he remained until 1921. At Rabat, Malta, he was appointed Acting Regent of Studies of the Studium Generale. In 1914 he was also appointed Professor of Dogmatic Theology at the bishop's major seminary at Mdina, Malta.

=== Commitments ===
In 1921 Callus went to England for two years. He settled at Hawkesyard, Staffordshire as Acting Regent of Studies. Here, he gave lectures and prepared the examination ad gradum for the Master of Sacred Theology degree which he obtained in 1924 at Rome's Pontificium Collegium Internationale Angelicum, the future Pontifical University of Saint Thomas Aquinas, Angelicum, (the degree was officially conferred a year later). That same year, Callus was sent to Viterbo, Italy, as Regent of Studies. He stayed here just over a year.

On May 1, 1924, Callus was honored with the title "Master of Sacred Theology" bestowed by Procurator General of the Dominican Order. He then returned to Malta and was appointed Professor of Holy Scripture and Hebrew at the University of Malta (1924). He was also appointed Regent of Studies at the Dominicans' Studium Generale at Rabat, Malta.

=== At Oxford ===
In 1931 Callus resigned from all of his offices in Malta and permanently left for Hawkesyard, and then, a year later, for Oxford, England, where he stayed until his death. Here he was engaged in predominantly academic and intellectual work. At first he became a research student, exercising himself further in paleography. Later, he became part of a group of distinguished scholars and intellectuals so as to study Medieval Theology and Philosophy. Callus thus continued to mature his philosophical views and to extend his already wide horizon of knowledge. In 1938 he received the degree of Doctor of Philosophy being the first Dominican since the reformation to take a degree at Oxford. Two years later in 1940 he was appointed Regent of Studies at Blackfriars, Oxford, an office he held for twelve years. That same year, the University of Malta awarded him the title of Emeritus Professor. In 1943 he was elected Member of the Medieval Academy of America, and in 1946 he was elected Member of the Committee of the Medieval Latin Dictionary of the British Academy. A year later, in 1947, he was elected Fellow of the Royal Historical Society, and the following year he became the first editor of Dominican Studies. In 1953 the University of Oxford conferred upon him the degree of Master of Arts, and in that same year he was appointed Member of the Congregation of the University of Oxford. In 1962 he was also conferred the degree of Doctor of Literature 'Honoris Causa' by the University of Malta.

=== Death ===
Callus traveled far and wide lecturing and addressing seminars and conferences on Medieval philosophers, and expounding his own philosophy. On March 25, 1965, he was in Malta celebrating his diamond jubilee as a Dominican. A month later, while still in Malta, he was taken ill, and died on May 26 at the Dominican hospital of St. Catherine's in Attard. He was buried at the cemetery of Żebbuġ, Malta, his birthplace, following an impressive funeral at the church of St. Dominic's in Valletta.

== Works ==
According to scholarly analysis and criticism, Callus' academic and intellectual endeavour is divided between his 'Malta Period' (1912–1931) and his 'Oxford Period'. His publications from the first period, though interesting, are not of much interest to philosophy. His best scholarly contributions are all part of the latter period. They are not very numerous in number – just 40 contributions – but all of a very high calibre, both scientifically and, sometimes, philosophically. These works are generally distinguished under three main headings, as indicated hereunder:

=== Sacra Scriptura ===
These are contributions on themes related to Medieval texts and manuscripts linked to Holy Scripture or biblical studies.

- 1932 – La Comogonia Biblica secondo S. Agostino nel De Genesi ad litteram (The formation of the Bible according to St. Augustine in his 'De Genesi ad litteram').
- 1941 – The study of the Bible in the Middle Ages.
- 1961 – The Biblical and Patristic background of the Summa Theologiæ of St. Thomas Aquinas.

=== Varia ===
These contributions deal with varied themes not classifiable under the other headings.

- 1933 – The XIX centenary of the redemption.
- 1934 – Il P. Bede Jarrett O.P. (Fr. Bede Jarrett O.P.)
- 1941 – A Socialist experiment in our time.
- 1956 – Un fragment autographe de S. Thomas d'Aquin conservè à la Cathedrale de La Valletta, Malta (An autographed fragment of St. Thomas Aquinas kept at the Valletta Cathedral in Malta).

=== Mediaevalia ===
Callus' forte was related to Medieval manuscripts, texts and documents. These contributions are general in nature (grouped under the first heading below), related to Oxford scholars, theologians and/or philosophers (such as Robert Grosseteste and others listed in the second heading) or associated to a particular Medieval philosophical question, the so-called "Unity of Forms" (third heading).

In Genere

- 1933 – Some recent mediaeval studies.
- 1936 – The philosophical writings of Abailard.
- 1940 – The philosophy of St. Bonaventure and St. Thomas.
- 1941 – Philip the Chancellor and the 'De Anima' attributed to Robert Grosseteste.
- 1948 – An unknown commentary of Thomas Gallus on the Pseudo-Dionysian letters.
- 1948 – The 'Tabulæ super Originalia Patrum' of Robert Kilwardby O.P.
- 1949 – New manuscripts of Kilwardby's 'Tabulæ super Originalia Patrum.
- 1951 – Ten years of research in the medieval field (1940–1950), I.
- 1952 – The powers of the soul. An early unpublished text.
- 1952 – Ten years of research in the mediaeval field (1940–1950), II.
- 1954 – The contribution to the study of the Fathers made by the thirteenth-century Oxford Schools.
- 1955 – The treatise of John Blunt on the soul.
- 1957 – Les sources de Saint Thomas. L'etat de la question (The sources of St. Thomas Aquinas. The present state of the question).
- 1959 – Introduction of Arabian philosophy to Oxford.
- 1959 – 'Fides' and 'Auctoritas' in the late thirteenth-century Oxford School.
- 1960 – Une œvre recentement decouverte de S. Albert le Grande 'De XLIII problematibus ad Magistrum Ordinis' – 1271 (A newly discovered work of St. Albert the Great 'De XLIII problematibus ad Magistrum Ordinis' – 1271).
- 1960 – San Tommaso d'Aquino e Sant'Alberto Magno (St. Thomas Aquinas and St. Albert the Great).
- 1963 – The subject-matter of metaphysics according to some thirteenth-century Oxford masters.
- 1964 – The function of the philosophers in thirteenth-century Oxford.

Oxoniensia

- 1938 – Aristotelian learning at the University of Oxford in the thirteenth century.
- 1943 – The introduction of Aristotelian learning to Oxford.
- 1945 – The Oxford career of Robert Grosseteste.
- 1946 – The Condemnation of St. Thomas at Oxford, Aquinas Papers, 5, Oxford.
- 1946 – The 'Summa Duacensis' and the Pseudo-Grosseteste's 'De Anima'.
- 1947 – The date of Grosseteste's translations and commentaries on Pseudo-Dionysius and the 'Nicomachean Ethics'.
- 1948 – The 'Summa Theologiæ' of Robert Grosseteste.
- 1953 – Robert Grosseteste's place in the history of philosophy.
- 1955 - Robert Grosseteste: Scholar and Bishop, Essays in commemoration of the seventh centenary of his death (ed. by Daniel Callus), Clarendon Press, Oxford.
- 1955 – Robert Grosseteste as scholar.

Unitatis Formæ

- 1939 – Two early Oxford masters on the problem of plurality of forms: Adam of Buckfield and Richard Rufus of Cornwall.
- 1939 – Gundissalinus' 'De Anima' and the problem of substantial form.
- 1959 – The problem of the unity of form and Richard Knapwell O.P.
- 1960 – The problem of the plurality of forms in the thirteenth century. The Thomist innovation.
- 1961 – The origins of the problem of the unity of form.

== Sources ==
- Mark Montebello, Daniel Callus: Historian & Philosopher, Malta University Press, Malta, 1994.
- Mark Montebello, Il-Ktieb tal-Filosofija f'Malta (A Source Book of Philosophy in Malta), PIN Publications, Malta, 2001.

== See also ==
- Philosophy in Malta
