= Martin Grabmann =

German Catholic priest, medievalist and historian (1875–1949)

The Reverend Martin Grabmann OP
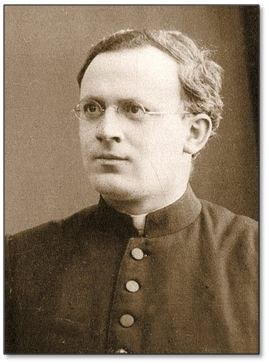
- Grabmann, c. 1900
- Born: January 5, 1875; Berching, Kingdom of Bavaria, German Empire
- Died: January 9, 1949 (aged 74); Eichstätt, U.S. Occupied Germany
- Occupations: Priest, historian, philosopher

Education
- Education: Collegium Divi Thomae de Urbe

Philosophical work
- School: Neo-scholasticism
- Institutions: Catholic University of Eichstätt-Ingolstadt; University of Vienna; Ludwig-Maximilians-Universität München
- Notable works: The History of Scholastic Method'

Martin Grabmann (5 January 1875 – 9 January 1949) was a German Catholic priest, medievalist and historian of theology and philosophy. He was a pioneer of the history of medieval philosophy and has been called "the greatest Catholic scholar of his time."

== Early life ==
Grabmann was born in Winterzhofen, Bavaria, Germany, on 5 January 1875 to a deeply religious Bavarian parents, Joseph Grabmann (1848-1915), a farmer, and Walburga Bauer (1850-1886). He had two brothers.

He attended the gymnasium in Eichstätt. At the College of Philosophy and Theology the Bischoefliches Lyzeum, a centre of scholastic renewal, Grabmann was influenced by his teacher Franz von Paula Morgott (1829-1900) to study the work of Thomas Aquinas.

== Religious life ==
In August 1895, Grabmann entered the Dominican Order in Olomouc - he left the convent after six months to become a secular priest, but remained a tertiary member of the Dominicans for the rest of his life.

Grabmann was ordained as a priest on March 20, 1898 and served for two years in Kipfenberg, Allersberg and Neumarkt. He then studied at the Angelicum, the St. Thomas College of the Dominicans in Rome for two years.

He then returned to pastoral work in Eichstätt, serving as a parish chaplain for a year, and then as confessor and spiritual director of the Benedictine convent for five years; this was his last pastoral work, as he spent the rest of his life in study and writing.

== Research ==
Grabmann was an alumnus of the Collegium Divi Thomæ de Urbe, the future Pontifical University of St. Thomas Aquinas Angelicum in Rome (Italy). At the Angelicum, he obtained a baccalaureate, a licentiate and a doctorate in philosophy by 1901 and a doctorate in theology in 1902. Grabmann studied palaeography at the Vatican Library and was encouraged by two of the most distinguished palaeographers of the time, Henry Denifle, the prefect of the Vatican library, and Cardinal Franz Ehrle.

== Career ==
Grabmann was made a professor of theology and philosophy at the Catholic University of Eichstätt in 1906.

The first of his great works, Die Geschichte der scholastischen Methode, in two volumes, 1909 and 1911 made extensive use of unpublished medieval texts. After the publication of his two-volume work, he was awarded an honorary doctorate by the Institut supérieur de philosophie (Higher Institute of Philosophy) of Louvain in 1913.

Grabmann was called to the University of Vienna in 1913 for the chair of Christian philosophy at the Faculty of Theology. There, he completed pioneering research on the history of Aristotelianism in the 13th century which was published in 1916 as Forschungen über die lateinischen Aristoteles-Übersetzungen des XIII. Jahrhunderts.

Grabmann returned to Bavaria in 1918 to serve as professor of dogmatic theology at the Ludwig-Maximilians-Universität München. His research and publications flourished, including 212 books, articles, and reviews. Between 1921 and 1938, his research took him to most of the major Italian libraries specializing in medieval studies, as well as to libraries in Spain, France, Belgium, and Sweden.

== Influence in philosophy ==
Grabmann's thought was instrumental in the modern understanding of scholasticism and the pivotal role of Aquinas. He was the first scholar to work out the outlines of the ongoing development of thought in scholasticism. He was first to see that Aquinas had a response and development of thought rather than a single, coherently emerged and organic whole.

According to Battista Mondin, Grabmann interprets Aquinas' metaphysics as an advanced version of Aristotle's based on the notion of common being (ens commune) and his rational theology as employing an original concept of being to describe the Divine attributes based on the notion of subsistent being itself (esse ipsum subsistens).

Grabmann was foundational in fostering the variety of contemporary interpretations of both scholasticism and Aquinas.

== Death ==
He died in Eichstätt on the afternoon of 9 January 1949, after suffering from chest pains; he was buried at the south wall of the Eichstätt East Cemetery.

== Works ==
Grabmann's 2-volume masterpiece The History of Scholastic Method (Die Geschichte der scolastischen Methode) (1909-1911) is the first scholarly work to outline the ongoing development of scholasticism.

His Thomas Aquinas: His Personality and Thought (Thomas von Aquin, eine einführung in seine persönlichkeit und gedankenwelt) (1912) emphasizes Aquinas' development of thought more than a single, coherent system. He also published Die Philosophia Pauperum und ihr Verfasser, Albert von Orlamünde: Ein Beitrag zur Geschichte des Philosophischen Unterrichtes an den Deutschen Stadschulen des Ausgehenden Mittelalters in 1918.

By the end of his life, his writings totalled over 400 books and essays.

Although Grabmann's works in German are numerous, only Thomas Aquinas (1928) is available in English.

== Sources ==
- Cross, F.L., Livingstone, E. A. (eds.), "Martin Grabmann," in: The Oxford Dictionary of the Christian Church (New York: Oxford University Press, 1974), p. 585.
- Rosemann, Philipp W., "Martin Grabmann (1875–1949)," in Medieval Scholarship: Biographical Studies on the Formation of a Discipline, ed. Helen Damico, vol. 3: Philosophy and the Arts, Garland Reference Library of the Humanities 2110 (New York: Garland Publishing, 2000), pp. 55–74.
