= Dominic Gravina =

Italian theologian

Dominic Gravina (born in Sicily, about 1573; died in the Minerva, at Rome, 26 August 1643) was an Italian Dominican theologian.

== Life ==
He entered the Dominican Order at Naples, and made his classical and sacred studies in the order's schools. As professor of theology in the Dominican college of St. Dominic (Naples), in the Minerva, and in other schools of his order, he became the most celebrated theologian of his time in Italy.

He was made master of sacred theology by a general chapter of the order held at Rome in 1608, and then became dean of the faculty of the theological college of Naples. In 1610 Gravina was professor of theology at Rome at the College of St. Thomas, the future Pontifical University of Saint Thomas Aquinas, Angelicum.

Gravina was made master of sacred theology by the General Chapter of the Order at Rome in 1608. He wrote Vox turturis seu de florenti usque ad nostra tempora ... sacrarum Religionum statu, 1625 in polemic with Robert Bellarmine whose De gemitu columbae criticized the decadence of religious orders.

In the pulpit he gained great renown and was frequently called upon to conduct Lenten courses and to preach before Pope Paul V. He displayed, moreover, a tireless activity in the administrative offices of prior and provincial in his own province, and of procurator general and vicar-general of the entire order.

While discharging the duties of these two offices, to the latter of which he was raised by Pope Urban VII, who had caused the general to be removed, he was also Master of the Sacred Palace.

== Works ==
Of his many writings on theological subjects, chiefly of an apologetic character, a large number have never been published. Of the published works the most important are:

- Catholicae praescriptiones adversus omnes haereticos (7 vols., Naples, 1619–39)
- Pro sacro ordinis sacramento vindiciae orthodoxae (Naples, 1634; Cologne, 1638)
- Apologeticus adversus novatorum calumnias (Naples, 1629; Cologne, 1638)
- Lapis Lydius ad discernendas veras a falsis revelationibus (2 vols., Naples, 1638), a mystical writing
