= 1632 =

1632 in various calendars
- Gregorian calendar: 1632; MDCXXXII
- Ab urbe condita: 2385
- Armenian calendar: 1081; ԹՎ ՌՁԱ
- Assyrian calendar: 6382
- Balinese saka calendar: 1553–1554
- Bengali calendar: 1038–1039
- Berber calendar: 2582
- English Regnal year: 7 Cha. 1 – 8 Cha. 1
- Buddhist calendar: 2176
- Burmese calendar: 994
- Byzantine calendar: 7140–7141
- Chinese calendar: 辛未年 (Metal Goat); 4329 or 4122 — to — 壬申年 (Water Monkey); 4330 or 4123
- Coptic calendar: 1348–1349
- Discordian calendar: 2798
- Ethiopian calendar: 1624–1625
- Hebrew calendar: 5392–5393
- Hindu calendars
- Vikram Samvat: 1688–1689
- Shaka Samvat: 1553–1554
- Kali Yuga: 4732–4733
- Holocene calendar: 11632
- Igbo calendar: 632–633
- Iranian calendar: 1010–1011
- Islamic calendar: 1041–1042
- Japanese calendar: Kan'ei 9 (寛永９年)
- Javanese calendar: 1553–1554
- Julian calendar: Gregorian minus 10 days
- Korean calendar: 3965
- Minguo calendar: 280 before ROC 民前280年
- Nanakshahi calendar: 164
- Thai solar calendar: 2174–2175
- Tibetan calendar: ལྕགས་མོ་ལུག་ལོ་ (female Iron-Sheep); 1758 or 1377 or 605 — to — ཆུ་ཕོ་སྤྲེ་ལོ་ (male Water-Monkey); 1759 or 1378 or 606

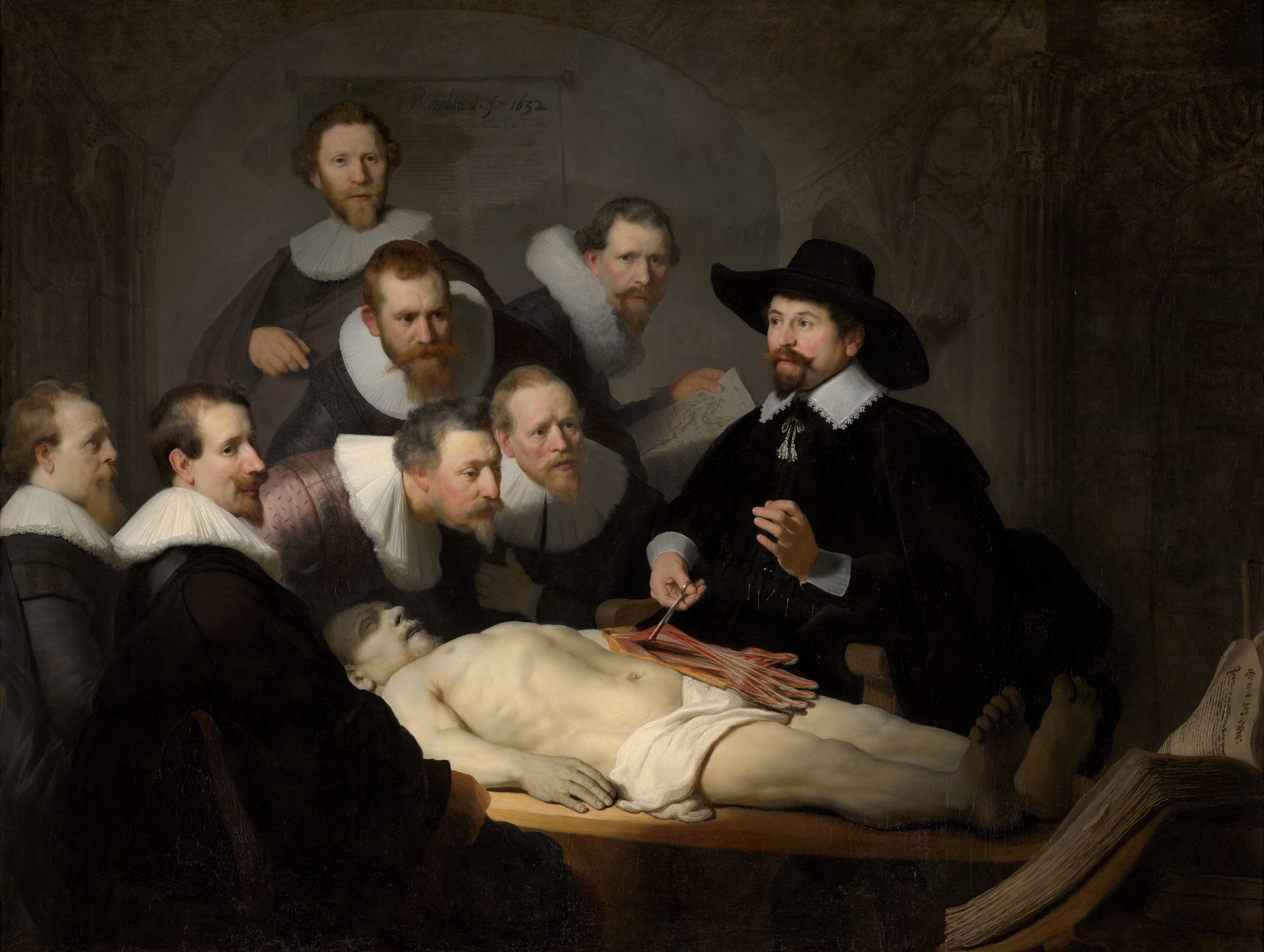
January 31: The Anatomy Lesson of Dr. Nicolaes Tulp is given and the event is later painted by Rembrandt.

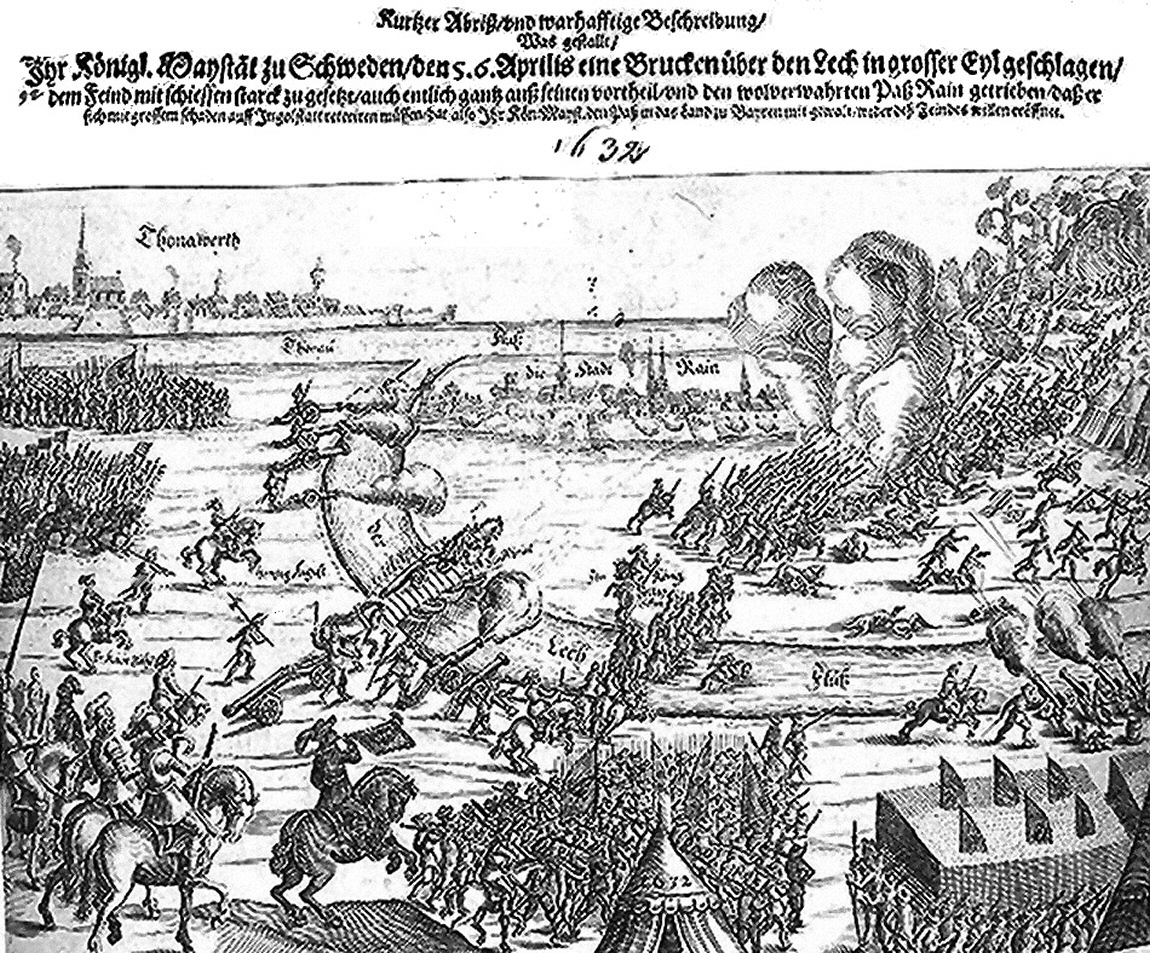
April 15: Sweden'a Army, led by King Gustavus Adolphus, defeats the Holy Roman Empire and fatally wounds Count Tilly in the Battle of Rain, fought at Bavaria near the village of Rain.

November 16: King Gustavus Adolphus of Sweden is killed in the Battle of Lützen.

1632 (MDCXXXII) was a leap year starting on Thursday of the Gregorian calendar and a leap year starting on Sunday of the Julian calendar, the 1632nd year of the Common Era (CE) and Anno Domini (AD) designations, the 632nd year of the 2nd millennium, the 32nd year of the 17th century, and the 3rd year of the 1630s decade. As of the start of 1632, the Gregorian calendar was 10 days ahead of the Julian calendar, which remained in localized use until 1923.

== Events ==
=== January–March ===
- January 8 – University of Amsterdam is established at the site of the Athenaeum Illustre of Amsterdam.
- January 31 – The dissection of a body for the benefit of medical students is carried out by Dr. Nicolaes Tulp, the anatomist for the city of Amsterdam, and will be immortalized in Rembrandt's painting The Anatomy Lesson.
- February 22 – Galileo's Dialogue Concerning the Two Chief World Systems is published in Florence.
- March 9 – Thirty Years' War: Battle of Bamberg – Johann Tserclaes, Count of Tilly, commander of the Catholic League, defeats the Swedish army under Gustav Horn, and recaptures the town of Bamberg.
- March 21 – Thirty Years' War: King Gustavus Adolphus makes a triumphant entry into Nuremberg, where he is welcomed by the populace and pledges to protect the cause of Protestantism.
- March 29 – The Treaty of Saint-Germain-en-Laye is signed, returning Quebec to French control, after the English had seized it in 1629.
- March – Thirty Years' War: Gustavus Adolphus invades Bavaria with his army.

=== April–June ===
- April 15 – Thirty Years' War: Battle of Rain – Gustavus Adolphus defeats Tilly's Catholic League armies for the second time within a year; Tilly is severely wounded during the battle and dies on April 30.
- May 17 – Thirty Years' War: Munich, capital of Bavaria, is captured by the Swedish army.
- June 15 – Sir Francis Windebank is made chief Secretary of State in England.
- June 17 – Shah Jahan's beloved wife Mumtaz Mahal dies, after giving birth to their 14th child. Soon after, construction of the Taj Mahal, begins.
- June 20
  - Charles I of England issues a charter for the colony of Maryland (named in honor of Henrietta Maria), under the control of Lord Baltimore.
  - Two ships, Saint Jean (250 tons) and L'Esperance-en-Dieu, set sail from La Rochelle in France, bound for Acadia in North America.
- June 25 – Fasilides, Emperor of Ethiopia in succession to his father Susenyos, declares the state religion of the country again to be Ethiopian Orthodox Christianity, and confiscates the lands of the Jesuit missionaries, relegating them to Fremona.
- June 30 – The University of Tartu is founded.
- June – Eighty Years' War: Leading a Dutch army, Frederick Henry, Prince of Orange captures in short succession the cities of Venlo, Roermond and Sittard, before besieging the city of Maastricht.

=== July–September ===
- July 23 – Three hundred colonists for New France depart Dieppe.
- August 22 – Eighty Years' War: A Dutch army, led by Frederick Henry, Prince of Orange, captures the city of Maastricht after a two-month siege.
- September 1 – Battle of Castelnaudary: A rebellion against French king Louis XIII is crushed. The leader of the rebellion, Gaston, Duke of Orléans, the brother of Louis XIII, surrenders.
- September 3 – The last executions of Christians in Japan take place as four Spanish missionaries (including Augustinin friar Bartholomew Gutierrez) and two Japanese converts are burned alive in Nagasaki. They are beatified in 1867 as the last of the 205 Martyrs of Japan.
- September 9 – Thirty Years' War: Battle of the Alte Veste – Besieged by Wallenstein at Nuremberg, Swedish king Gustavus Adolphus attempts to break the siege, but is defeated.
- September 25 – Yakutsk, Russia is founded by Pyotr Beketov.

=== October–December ===
- October 15 – The University of Tartu officially opens, in Swedish Livonia.
- October 30 – Henri II de Montmorency, is executed for his participation in the rebellion of Gaston, Duke of Orléans, against French king Louis XIII.
- November 8 – Wladyslaw IV Waza is elected king of the Polish–Lithuanian Commonwealth, after Sigismund III Vasa's death.
- November 16 (November 6 Old Style) – Thirty Years' War: Battle of Lützen in Saxony – Swedish king Gustavus Adolphus leads an assault on Wallenstein's army, but is killed early in the battle, despite which the Swedish commanders manage to rally the army and eventually defeat Wallenstein, who withdraws from Saxony. Following the death of Gustavus Adolphus, he is succeeded as ruler of Sweden by his six-year-old daughter Christina, while five regents (headed by Axel Oxenstierna) govern the country. On November 17, Gottfried zu Pappenheim, Field Marshal of the Holy Roman Empire, dies from wounds sustained in the battle.
- December 6 – Indians wipe out a new Dutch settlement of Swanadael in New Netherland.

=== Date unknown ===
- Antigua and Barbuda is first colonized by England.
- The Portuguese are driven out of Bengal.
- King Władysław IV Vasa of Poland forbids anti-Semitic books and printings.
- The rural parish of Loppi was founded.
- Construction of the Taj Mahal begins.
- Catharina Stopia succeeds her spouse as Sweden's ambassador to Russia, becoming perhaps the first female diplomat in Europe.
- Approximate date – Last inhabitants leave the original city of Reimerswaal in Zeeland.

== Births ==
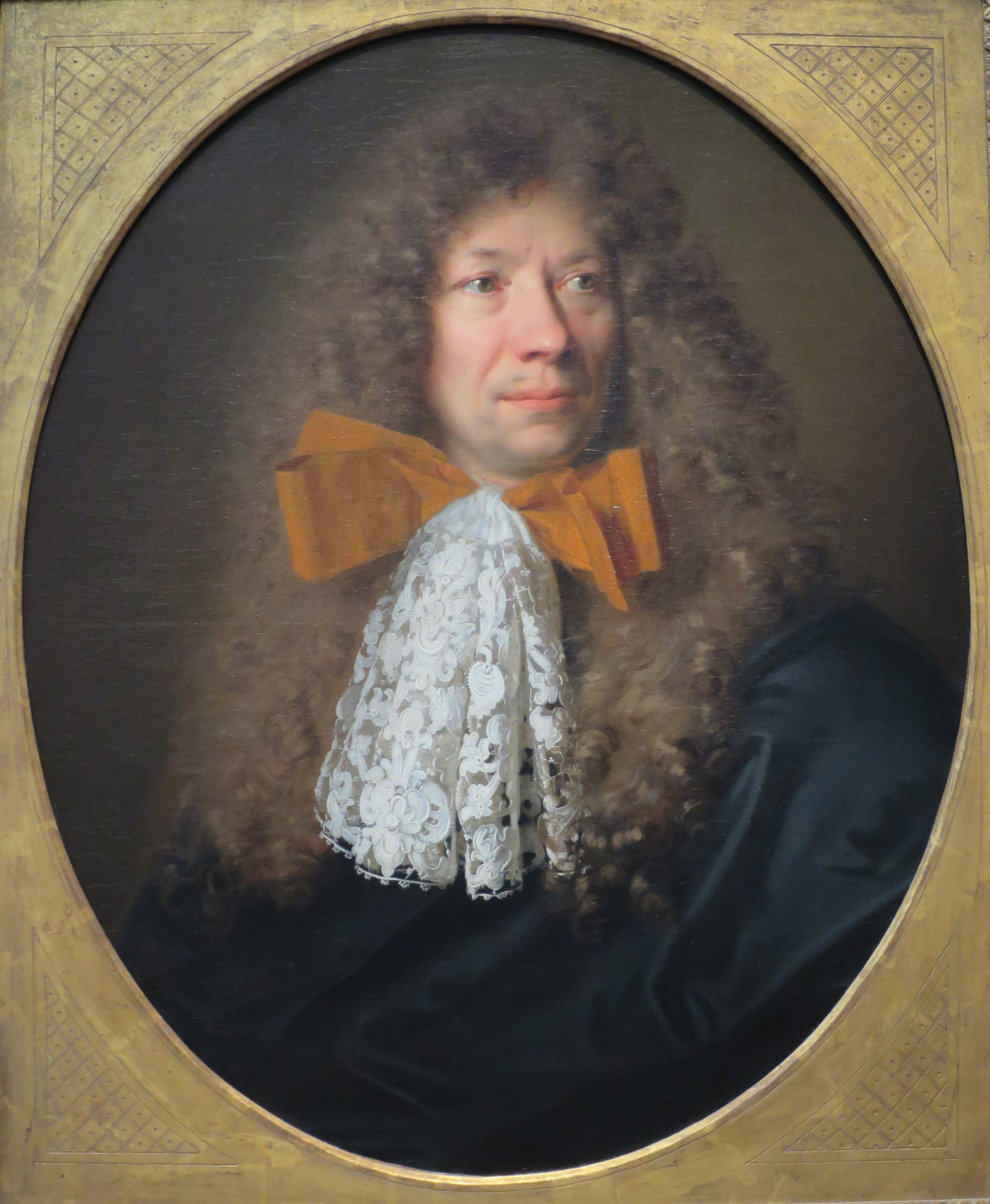
Adam Frans van der Meulen

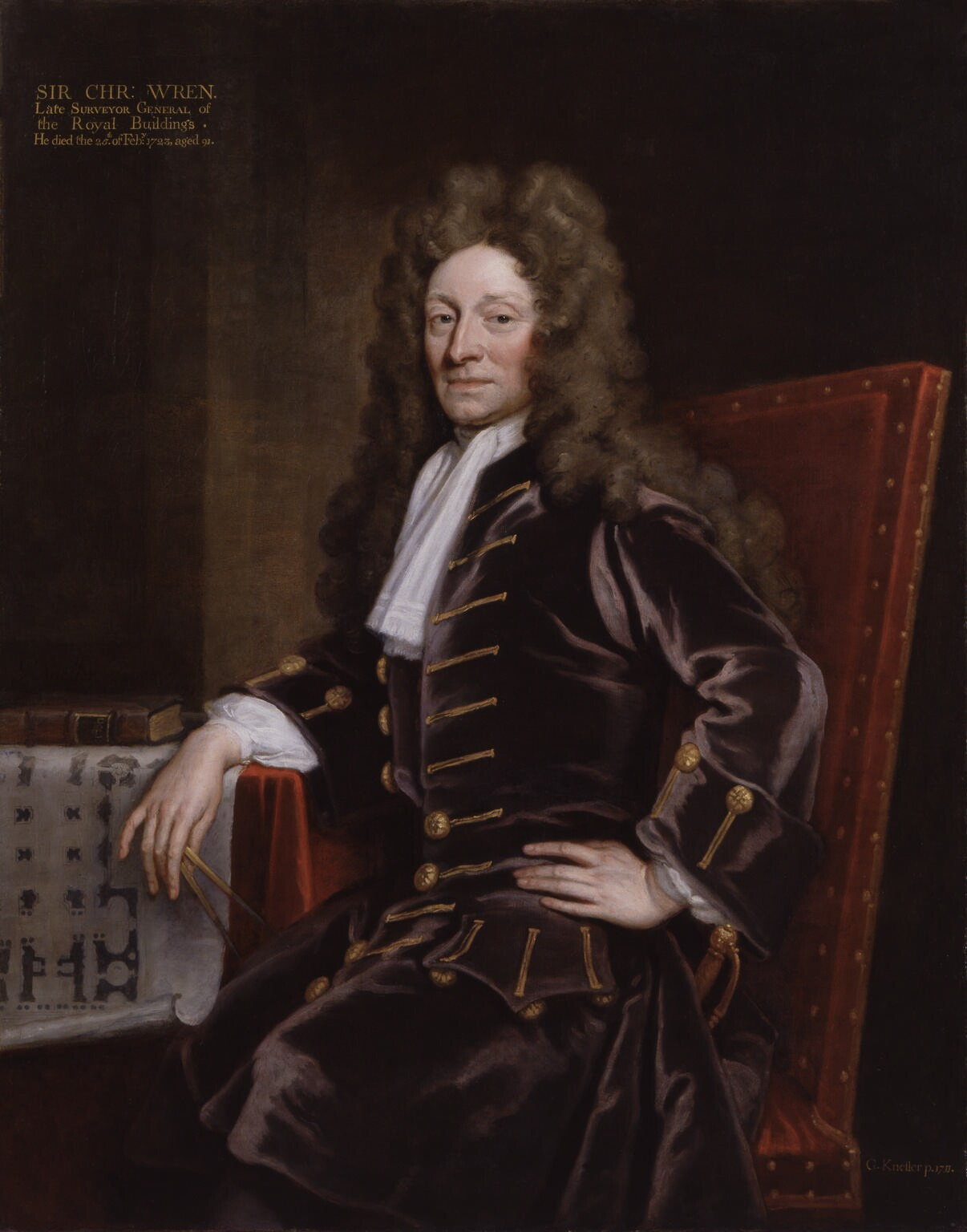
Christopher Wren

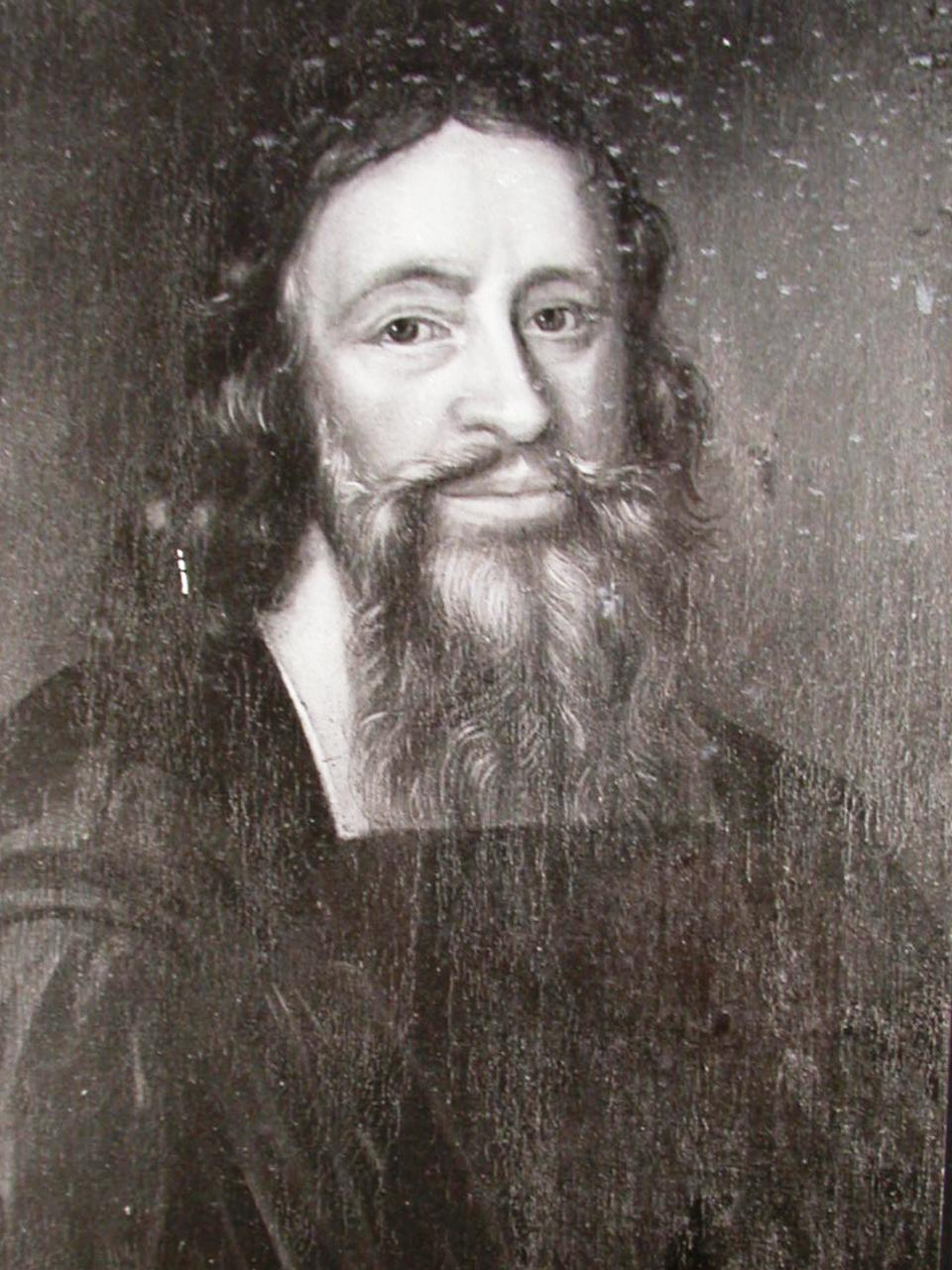
Erik Benzelius the Elder

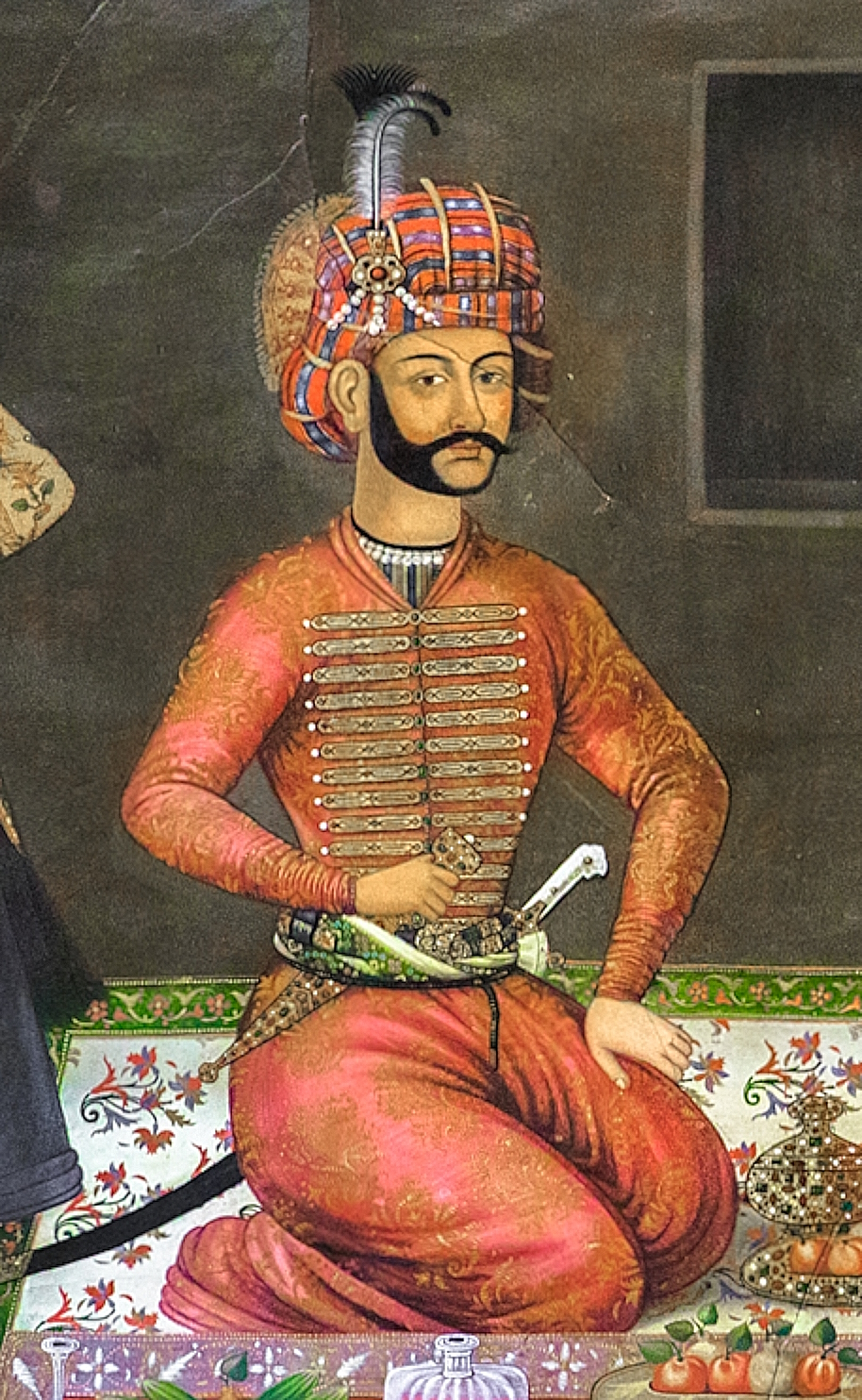
Abbas II of Persia

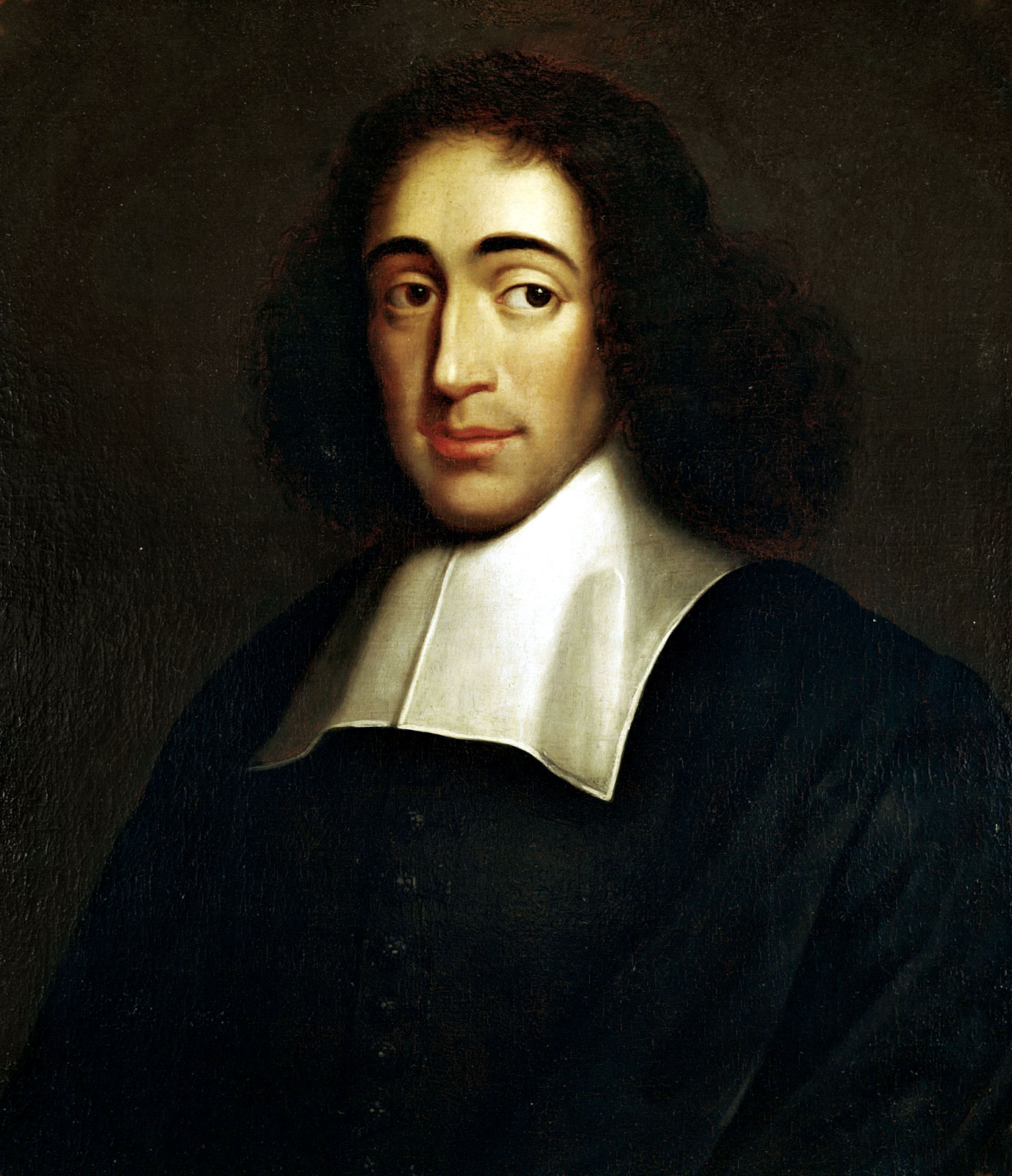
Baruch Spinoza

=== January–March ===
- January 1 – Claude de Choiseul-Francières, Marshal of France (d. 1711)
- January 3 – Sir John Duke, 2nd Baronet, Member of Parliament of England (d. 1705)
- January 8 – Samuel von Pufendorf, German jurist (d. 1694)
- January 11
  - Adam Frans van der Meulen, Flemish Baroque painter specialising in battle scenes (d. 1690)
  - John Platt, American settler (d. 1705)
- January 14 – Gustavus Adolphus of the Palatinate, German noble (d. 1641)
- January 26 – Marie Charlotte de la Trémoille, French noble (d. 1682)
- January 29
  - Elsa Elisabeth Brahe, Swedish countess and duchess (d. 1689)
  - Johann Georg Graevius, German classical scholar and critic (d. 1703)
- February 11 – Francisco de Aguiar y Seijas, Spanish cleric and bishop (d. 1698)
- February 12 – Charles Aubert de La Chesnaye, French businessman active in Canada (d. 1702)
- February 18 – Giovanni Battista Vitali, Italian composer (d. 1692)
- February 20 – Thomas Osborne, 1st Duke of Leeds, English statesman (d. 1712)
- February 24 – Antoine Benoist, French painter (d. 1717)
- February 29 – Juriaen van Streeck, Dutch painter (d. 1687)
- March 8 – Davide Cocco Palmieri, Italian Catholic bishop (d. 1711)
- March 13 – John Houblon, first Governor of the Bank of England (1694-1697) (d. 1712)
- March 21 – Sir John Hotham, 2nd Baronet, Member of the House of Commons of England (d. 1689)
- March 25 – John Temple, Irish politician (d. 1705)
- March 27 – Gustav Adolph, Count of Nassau-Saarbrücken and general sergeant of the Holy Roman Empire at the Rhine (d. 1677)
- March 30 – John Proctor, Massachusetts farmer, tavern keeper (d. 1692)

=== April–June ===
- April 2 – Georg Caspar Wecker, German composer (d. 1695)
- April 6
  - Maria Leopoldine of Austria, Holy Roman Empress (d. 1649)
  - Simon Philip, Count of Lippe-Detmold (1636–1650) (d. 1650)
- April 12 – Henry Chauncy, British antiquarian (d. 1719)
- April 19 – Charles Cornwallis, 2nd Baron Cornwallis, Member of Parliament (d. 1673)
- April 21 – Sir Hugh Smith, 1st Baronet, English Member of Parliament (d. 1680)
- May 1 – Friedrich Spanheim the Younger, Calvinist theologian (d. 1701)
- May 3 – Catherine of St. Augustine, French nun, nurse of New France (d. 1668)
- May 8 – Heino Heinrich Graf von Flemming, German field marshal, Governor of Berlin (d. 1706)
- May 13 – Nicolas Pitau, Flemish-born French engraver (d. 1671)
- May 15 – Adolf William, Duke of Saxe-Eisenach (d. 1668)
- May 16 – Jeremias van Rensselaer, Dutch colonial governor (d. 1674)
- May 17 – John Hall, English politician (d. 1711)
- May 21 – Feodosia Morozova, Russian religious dissident martyr (d. 1675)
- June 10 – Esprit Fléchier, French writer and Bishop of Nîmes (d. 1710)
- June 14 – Jean Gallois, French scholar and abbé (d. 1707)
- June 25 – Girolamo Corner, Venetian statesman and military commander (d. 1690)

=== July–September ===
- July 3 – Tylman van Gameren, Dutch architect (d. 1706)
- July 15 – Thomas Seamer, founding settler of Norwalk, Connecticut (d. 1712)
- July 21 – Sir Hugh Cholmeley, 4th Baronet, English politician (d. 1689)
- August 2 – Kaspar von Stieler, German soldier-poet (d. 1707)
- August 13 – François-Séraphin Régnier-Desmarais, French diplomat and writer (d. 1713)
- August 15 – Valentine Hollingsworth, English colonist of Delaware (d. 1710)
- August 20 – Louis Bourdaloue, French Jesuit and preacher (d. 1704)
- August 27 – Johannetta of Sayn-Wittgenstein, German noblewoman member of the House of Sponheim (d. 1701)
- August 29 – John Locke, English philosopher (d. 1704)
- September 3 – John Tregonwell, English Member of Parliament (d. 1682)
- September 14 – Francis Hyacinth, Duke of Savoy (d. 1638)
- September 15 – François Adhémar de Monteil, Comte de Grignan, French aristocrat (d. 1714)
- September 23 – Agatha Christine of Hanau-Lichtenberg, German noblewoman (d. 1681)
- September 29 – George III, Landgrave of Hesse-Itter (1661–1676) (d. 1676)

=== October–December ===
- October 1 – George Durant, attorney in the Province of Carolina (d. 1692)
- October 18 – Thomas Proby, English politician (d. 1689)
- October 20
  - Pedro Antonio Fernández de Castro, 10th Count of Lemos, Viceroy of Peru (d. 1672)
  - Edward Hungerford, English politician (d. 1711)
  - Sir Christopher Wren, English architect, astronomer and mathematician (d. 1723)
- October 21 – William Hedges, first governor of the East India Company (d. 1701)
- October 24 – Anton van Leeuwenhoek, Dutch scientist (d. 1723)
- October 25
  - Charles Dormer, 2nd Earl of Carnarvon, English noble (d. 1709)
  - Francis Mezger, Austrian Benedictine academic and writer (d. 1701)
- October 28 – Antoine Massoulié, French Dominican theologian (d. 1706)
- October 29 – Enno Louis, Prince of East Frisia, Frisian prince (d. 1660)
- October 31 (bapt.) – Johannes Vermeer, Dutch painter (d. 1675)
- November 16 – Sir Anthony Cope, 4th Baronet, English Member of Parliament (d. 1675)
- November 23 – Jean Mabillon, French Benedictine monk and scholar of the Congregation of Saint Maur (d. 1707)
- November 24 – Baruch Spinoza, Dutch philosopher (d. 1677)
- November 26 – Philipp Ludwig III, Count of Hanau-Münzenberg (1638–1641) (d. 1641)
- November 28 – Jean-Baptiste Lully, Italian-born French composer (d. 1687)
- December 9 – William Clayton, acting Governor of the Pennsylvania Colony (1684–1685) (d. 1689)
- December 16 – Erik Benzelius the Elder, Swedish theologian (d. 1709)
- December 17 – Anthony Wood, English antiquarian (d. 1695)
- December 24
  - Matthias Petersen, sea captain and whaler from the North Frisian island of Föhr (d. 1706)
  - Ōkubo Tadatomo, Japanese daimyō (d. 1712)
- December 31 – Abbas II of Persia, Shah of Iran (d. 1666)

=== Date unknown ===
- Bárbara Coronel, Spanish actress (d. 1691)
- Anne de La Grange-Trianon, French courtier (d. 1707)
- Louise Boyer, French duchess and courtier (d. 1697)

== Deaths ==
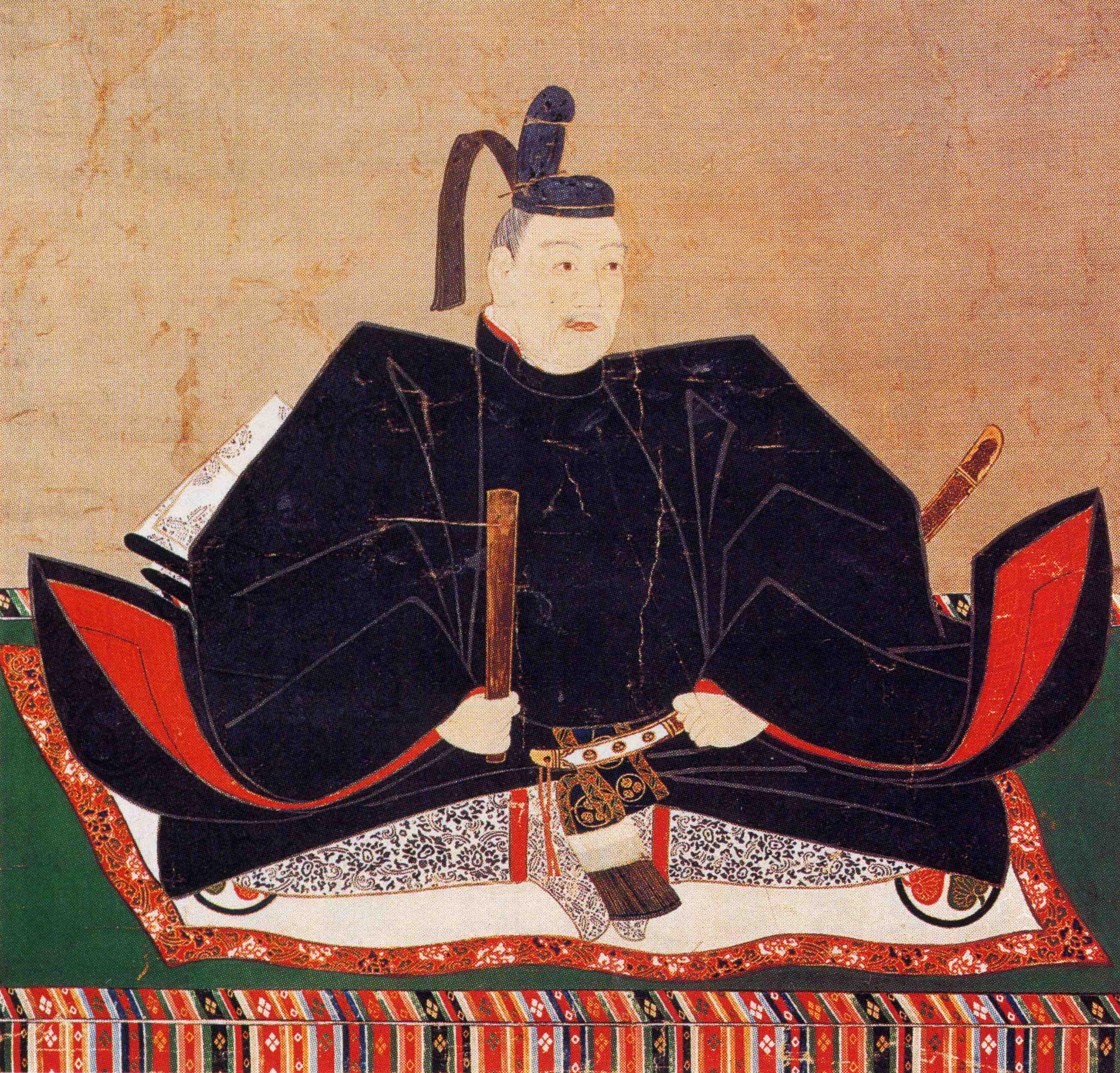
Tokugawa Hidetada

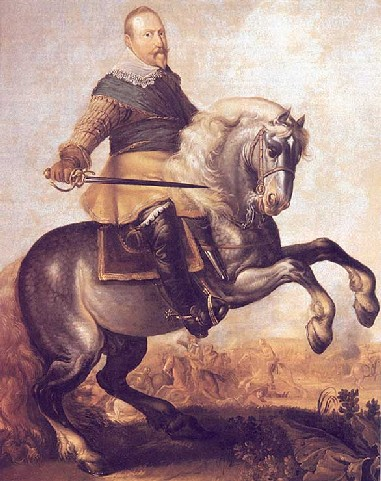
King Gustavus Adolphus of Sweden

- January 1 – Giovanni Battista Agucchi, Italian churchman, papal diplomat and writer on art theory (b. 1570)
- January 31 – Joost Bürgi, Swiss clockmaker and mathematician (b. 1552)
- February 7 – Margherita Gonzaga, Duchess of Lorraine (b. 1591)
- February 10 – Simon Steward, English politician (b. 1575)
- March – Gazi Hüsrev Pasha, Ottoman grand vizier
- March 14 – Tokugawa Hidetada, Japanese shōgun (b. 1579)
- March 15 – Maurice, Landgrave of Hesse-Kassel, German musician (b. 1572)
- April 23 – Sir Drue Drury, 1st Baronet, English politician (b. 1588)
- April 30 – Sigismund III Vasa, King of Sweden (1592–1599) and Poland (1587–1632) (b. 1566)
- April 30 – Johan Tzerclaes, Count of Tilly, Bavarian general (b. 1559)
- May 24 – Robert Hues, English mathematician and geographer (b. 1553)
- May 25 – Adam Tanner, Austrian mathematician and philosopher (b. 1572)
- June 2 – Ernest Casimir I, Count of Nassau-Dietz (1606–1632) and Stadtholder of Groningen, Friesland and Drenthe (1625–1632) (b. 1573)
- June 20 – Miles Hobart, English politician (b. 1595)
- June 22 – James Whitelocke, English judge (b. 1570)
- July 22 – Juan Niño de Tabora, Spanish general and governor of the Philippines (date of birth unknown)
- July 29 – Samuel Ampzing, Dutch linguist and historian (b. 1590)
- July 30 – Archduke Charles of Austria (b. 1607)
- August 13 – Queen Inmok, Korean royal consort (b. 1584)
- August 14 – Augustus, Count Palatine of Sulzbach (b. 1582)
- August 19 – Valentin de Boulogne, French painter (b. 1591)
- August 23 – Frances Carr, Countess of Somerset (b. 1590)
- August 25 – Thomas Dekker, English dramatist (b. c.1572)
- September 13 – Leopold V, Archduke of Austria, regent of Tyrol (b. 1586)
- September 17 – Emperor Susenyos of Ethiopia (b. 1607)
- September 30 – Thomas Allen, English mathematician and astrologer (b. 1542)
- October 6 – Anna of Cleves, Duchess of Jülich-Cleves-Berg and Countess Palatine of Neuburg (b. 1552)
- October 12 – Kutsuki Mototsuna, Japanese samurai commander (b. 1549)
- October 14 – Francis II, Duke of Lorraine (b. 1572)
- October 16 – George More, English politician (b. 1553)
- October 23 – Giovanni Battista Crespi, Italian painter (b. 1573)
- October 30 – Henri II de Montmorency, French naval officer and Governor of Languedoc (b. 1595)
- November 5 – Henry Percy, 9th Earl of Northumberland (b. 1564)
- November 6 – King Gustavus Adolphus of Sweden (in battle) (b. 1594)
- November 9 – Miyake Yasunobu, Japanese daimyō (b. 1563)
- November 17 – Gottfried Heinrich Graf zu Pappenheim, Bavarian field marshal (b. 1594)
- November 21 – Nils Brahe, Swedish soldier and younger brother of Per Brahe (b. 1604)
- November 27 – John Eliot, English statesman (b. 1592)
- November 29 – Frederick V of the Palatinate, briefly King of Bohemia (b. 1596)
- December 2 – Duke Johann Wilhelm of Saxe-Altenburg, colonel in the Saxon Army (b. 1600)
- December 8 – Philippe van Lansberge, Flemish astronomer (b. 1561)
- date unknown
  - Domhnall Spáinneach mac Murchadha Caomhánach, last de facto King of Leinster
  - Zhu Guozhen, Chinese Ming dynasty official, historian and scholar (b. 1557)
