= Boveri =

Boveri is the surname of several people:

- Atilio Boveri (1885–1949), Argentine painter
- Giovanni Boveri (Boverius), (1568–1638), Italian jurist
- Juan Carlos Boveri (born 1950), Argentine writer
- Marcella Boveri (1863–1950), US biologist, wife of Theodor
- Margret Boveri (1900–1975), German journalist and publicist, daughter of Marcella and Theodor
- Theodor Boveri (1862–1915), German biologist, brother of Walter
- Walter Boveri (1865–1924), German-Swiss industrialist, co-founder of the company Brown, Boveri & Cie, brother of Theodor
