= Antonin Cloche =

French Catholic priest (1628–1720)

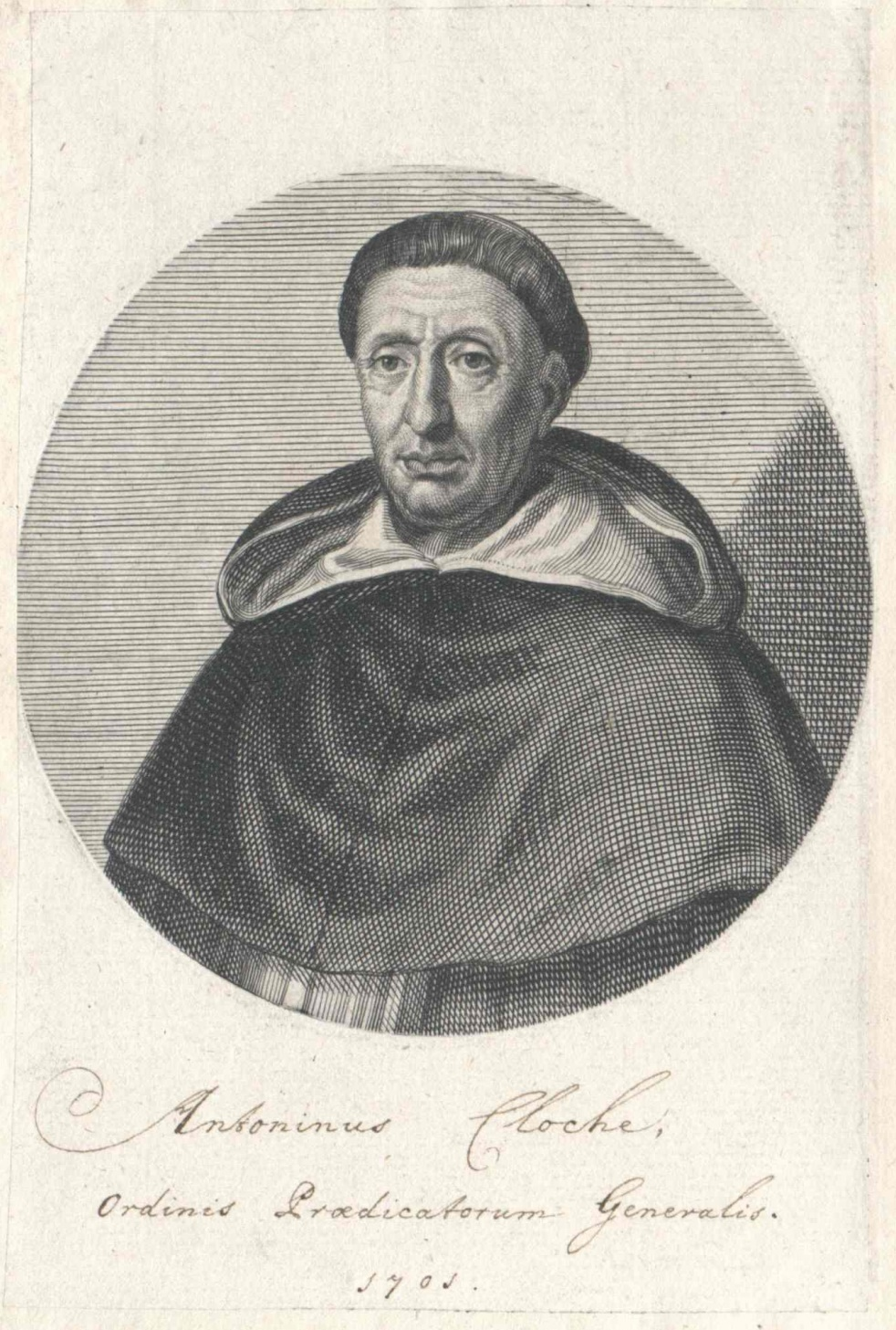

Antonin Cloche (1628–1720) was the Master of the Order of Preachers from 1686 to 1720.

== Early biography ==
Antonin Cloche was from a rich French family.

== Formation ==
Cloche entered the Dominican Order in the Province of Toulouse.

== Career ==
Under the masterships of Juan Tomás de Rocaberti and Antonio de Monroy Cloche served as the master's envoy to the Kingdom of France.

Cloche was unanimously elected master at the Dominican chapter held in 1686 at Rome after the death of the previous master de Monroy. As the new Master General, he revised the rules and constitutions of the nuns of the Order of S. Dominic.

In 1696, Cloche started the process for the canonisation of Pope Pius V and soon had a magnificent sarcophagus made for him in the Sistine Chapel in Santa Maria Maggiore by the sculptor Pierre Le Gros the Younger.

Shortly before the death of his friend Cardinal Girolamo Casanate in 1700, Cloche set out to build a library for the substantial collection of books he was to leave to the Dominicans. The Biblioteca Casanatense, attached to the Convent of Santa Maria sopra Minerva in Rome, was inaugurated in 1701. Already in 1717 it transpired that the library was too small, so Cloche had an extension built from 1719 but did not live to see its completion in 1721.

As master, he was a proponent of popular preaching along the lines of the Congregation of the Blessed Sacrament. Jansenism and Gallicanism continued spreading in the French order during his mastership. He lived as a great lord, hosting many ecclesiastical dignitaries at his country house in San Pastore.

He died in 1720 aged 92. In his honour, in 1721 his relief portrait by Bernardino Cametti was placed in old entrance to the Biblioteca Casanatense (now no longer part of the library and only accessible through the church of Santa Maria sopra Minerva).

== Patron of the arts ==
Cloche was eager to promote the status of the Dominicans by means of art. His sculptor of choice was Le Gros who was a rising star in 1697-98 when he produced the Sarcophagus for Pope Pius V. It was probably Cloche's secretary, the painter Frère Baptiste Monnoyer, a friend of Le Gros' from student days in Paris, who acted as a go-between.

Following Casanate's death, Le Gros was immediately commissioned to create the cardinal's tomb in the Lateran Basilica (1700–1703) and subsequently his honorary statue in the Biblioteca Casanatense (1706–1708).

When Pope Clement XI offered the many niches in Saint Peter's to the religious orders to erect a statue to their founders, Cloche jumped at the opportunity and commissioned the Statue of Saint Dominic from Le Gros (1702–1706). No other order saw the necessity to hurry, which made Saint Dominic the very first and for decades the only monumental statue of a founder in Saint Peter's.

== Literature ==
- Conrado Pio Mesfin (pseudonym of Fra Domenico Ponsi), Vita del Reverendissimo Padre F. Antonino Cloche Maestro Generale del Sacro Ordine de' Padri Predicatori, Benevento 1721.
- R.P.D. Laplace, funèbre du reverendissime père Antonin Cloche, docteur en théologie, grand d'Espagne, et général de tout l'ordre des frères préscheurs, Paris 1720.

Catholic Church titles
Preceded by Antonio de Monroy	Master of the Order of Preachers; 1686–1720	Succeeded by Agustín Pipia
