= Walter Boveri =

Swiss-German industrialist

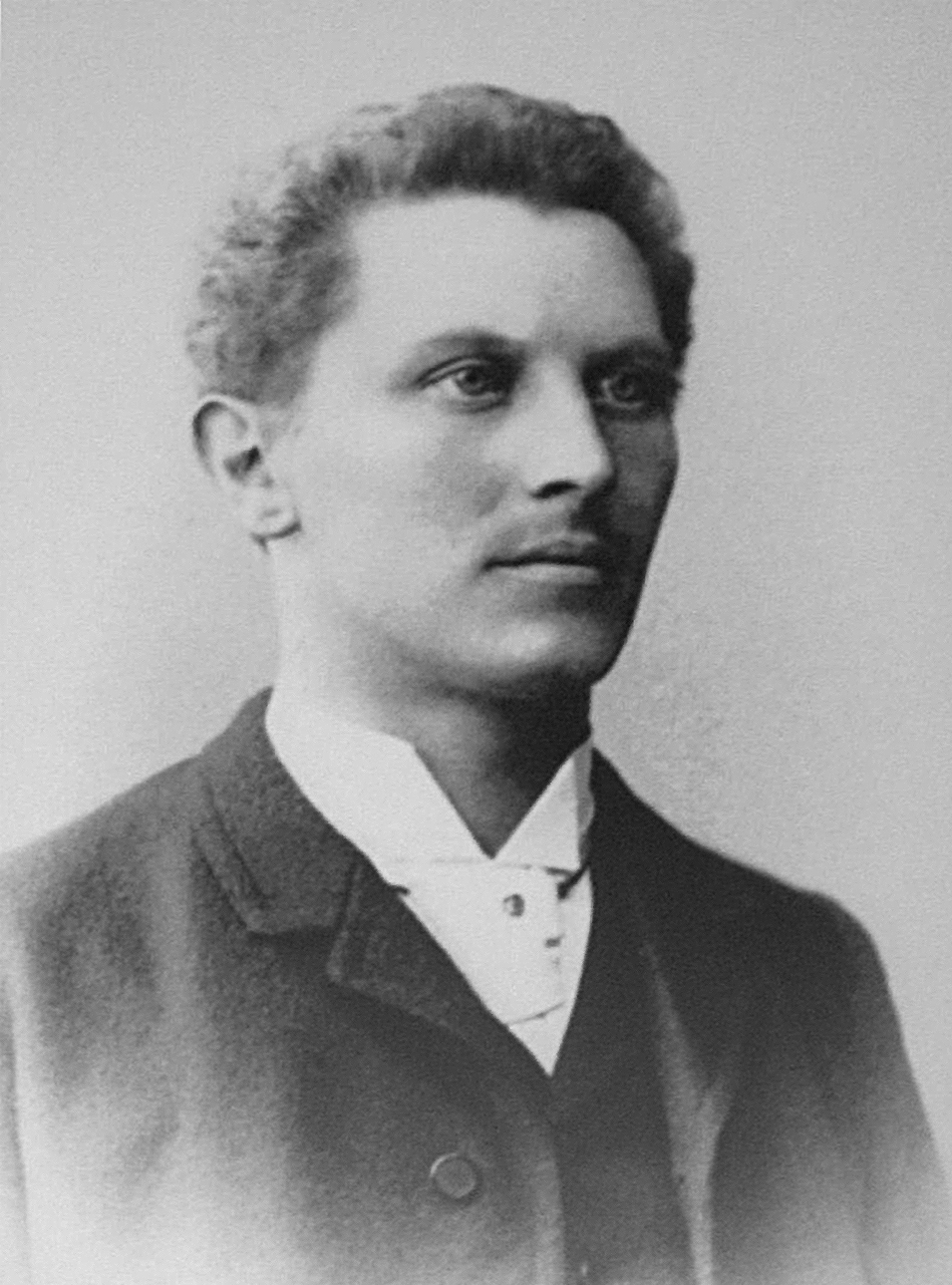
Walter Boveri

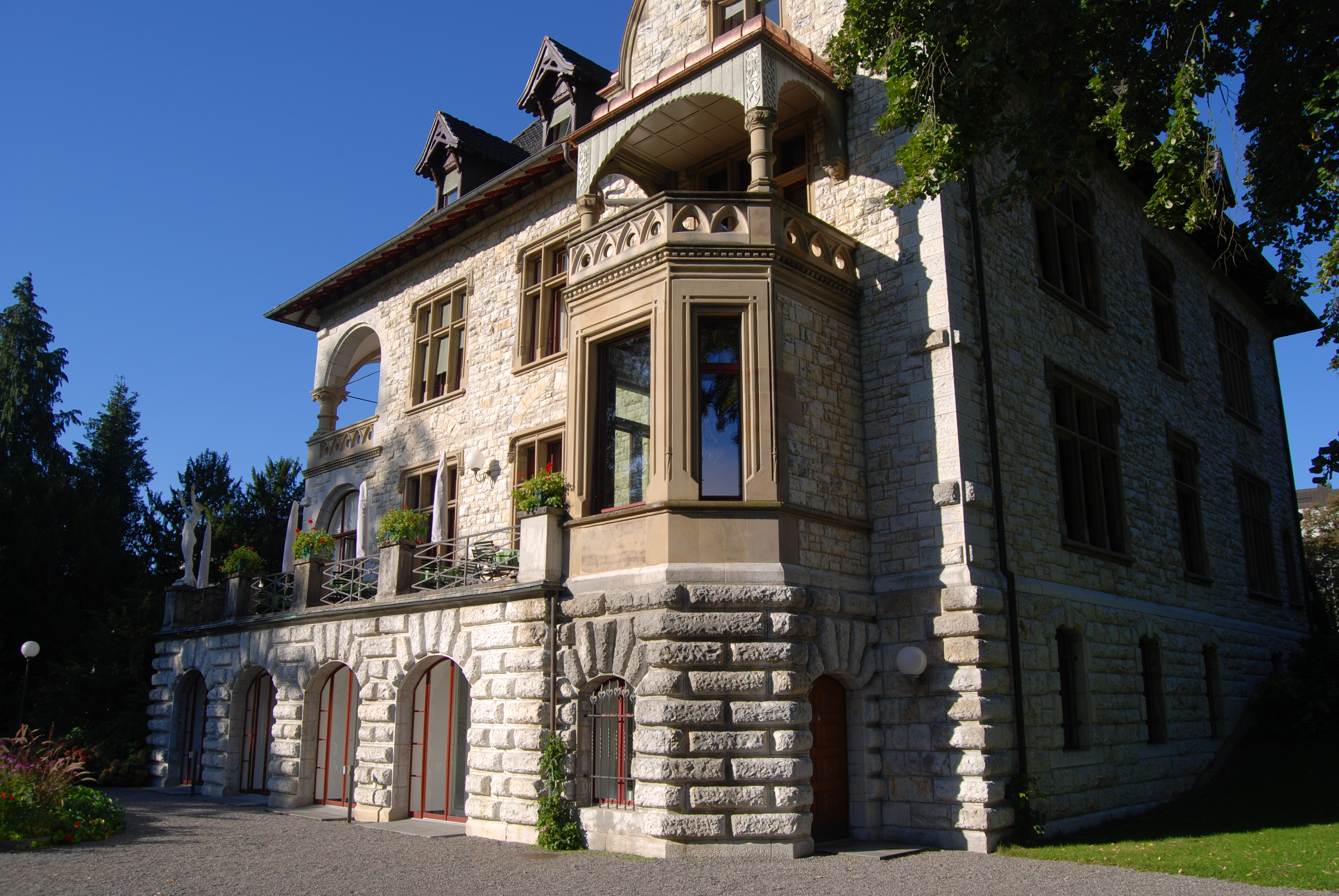
Villa Boveri

Walter Boveri (born 21 February 1865 in Bamberg, Kingdom of Bavaria, died 28 October 1924 in Baden, Switzerland) was a Swiss-German industrialist and co-founder of the global electrical engineering group Brown, Boveri & Cie. (BBC).

== Biography ==
Boveri's ancestors originally came from Savoy and settled at the beginning of the 17th century in Iphofen, Lower Franconia. By 1835 they were in Bamberg. Walter was born in 1865 as the third of four sons of the doctor Theodor Boveri. The second oldest son Theodor Boveri junior became a well-known biologist. His brother Theodor married to biologist Marcella O'Grady and they were the parents of journalist Margret Boveri. As a 17-year-old Walter Boveri joined the Royal Engineering School in Nuremberg. He finished this in 1885 and then moved to Switzerland. There he was first volunteer and later assembly manager for electrical systems at Maschinenfabrik Oerlikon (MFO).

In 1887, Charles Eugene Lancelot Brown, technical director of MFO, envisaged setting up his own business. Boveri teamed up with him and started looking for investors, but remained unsuccessful for several years. In 1891 Boveri married Victoire Baumann. Before the marriage, he received a generous loan from his future father-in-law, the Zurich silk industrialist Conrad Baumann. Brown and Boveri signed an association agreement in December 1890, and three months later they chose Baden as the company location. The founding of Brown, Boveri & Cie. (BBC) took place on 2 October 1891. Two years later, Boveri received Swiss citizenship. In 1895 he had the Villa Boveri built for himself and his family.

Brown took care of the company's technical affairs, while Boveri, though technically gifted, took on the role of visionary commercial director. He was assisted by his cousin Fritz Funk, whom he had taken on as a limited partner in the company. Boveri was responsible for growing BBC into a large international company.

In connection with the construction of the Ruppoldingen hydro-electric plant near Rothrist, Boveri founded the power company Olten-Aarburg AG in 1894, which became Aare Tessin AG in 1936. He decided that another company was needed for the planning, financing and construction of power plants so, in 1895, he founded Motor AG which later became Motor-Columbus.

After Brown retired to private life Boveri was, from 1911 to 1924, Chairman of BBC. He presided over various electricity companies and, during World War I, the Société Suisse de Surveillance Economique. His work on railway electrification earned him a place on the board of Swiss Federal Railways. As president of various municipal commissions, he was also active in Baden's local politics.

Boveri's sons Theodor and Walter junior later worked in various roles within the company. His brother Robert (1873–1934) led the subsidiary, BBC Mannheim, for several years until his death. Robert's son, William Boveri, was employed there until the 1970s as a director.

== Awards ==
- 1916 honorary doctor of the ETH Zurich
- 1916 Honorary citizen of Baden
