= Contenson =

Contenson may refer to:

- Vincent Contenson
- tenso, an Occitan literary genre
