= Ablative case =

Grammatical case

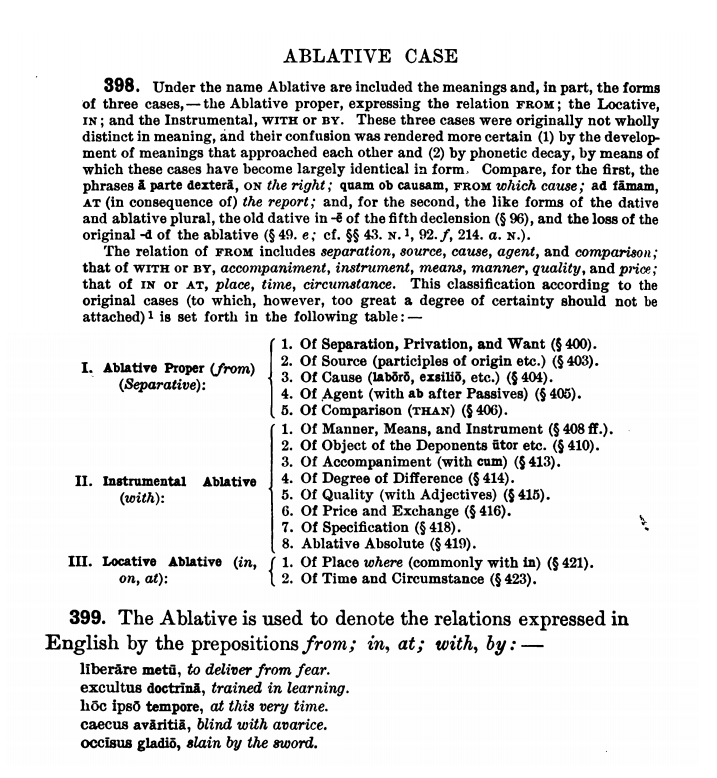
Introduction to the ablative case from a 1903 Latin textbook

In grammar, the ablative case (pronounced /ˈæblətɪv/ AB-lə-tiv; abbreviated abl) is a grammatical case for nouns, pronouns, and adjectives in the grammars of various languages. It is used to indicate motion away from something. In different languages it can additionally serve various other purposes, e.g., to make comparisons (in Armenian). The word "ablative" derives from the Latin ablatus, the (suppletive) perfect, passive participle of auferre "to carry away".

The ablative case is found in several language families, such as Indo-European (e.g. Sanskrit, Latin, Albanian, Armenian, Punjabi), Turkic (e.g. Turkish, Turkmen, Azerbaijani, Uzbek, Kazakh, Kyrgyz, Tatar), Tungusic (e.g. Manchu, Evenki), Uralic (e.g. Hungarian), and the Dravidian languages. There is no ablative case in modern Germanic languages such as German and English. There was an ablative case in the early stages of Ancient Greek, but it quickly fell into disuse by the classical period.

== Indo-European languages ==
=== Latin ===
The ablative case in Latin (cāsus ablātīvus) appears in various grammatical constructions, including following various prepositions, in an ablative absolute clause, and adverbially. The Latin ablative case was derived from three Proto-Indo-European cases: ablative (from), instrumental (with), and locative (in/at).

=== Greek ===
In Ancient Greek, there was an ablative case (ἀφαιρετικὴ πτῶσις aphairetikē ptōsis) which was used in the Homeric, pre-Mycenaean, and Mycenean periods. It fell into disuse during the classical period and thereafter with some of its functions taken by the genitive and others by the dative. The genitive case with the prepositions ἀπό apó 'away from' and ἐκ/ἐξ ek/ex 'out of' is an example.

=== German ===
German does not have an ablative case but, exceptionally, Latin ablative case-forms were used from the seventeenth to the nineteenth century after some prepositions, for example after von in von dem Nomine: ablative of the Latin loanword nomen. Grammarians at that time, Justus Georg Schottel, Kaspar von Stieler, Johann Balthasar von Antesperg and Johann Christoph Gottsched, listed an ablative case (as the sixth case after nominative, genitive, dative, accusative and vocative) for German words. They considered the dative case after some prepositions to be an ablative, as in von dem Mann[e] 'from the man, of the man' and mit dem Mann[e] 'with the man', while they considered the dative case after other prepositions or without a preposition, as in dem Mann[e], to be a dative.

=== Albanian ===
The ablative case is found in Albanian; it is the fifth case, rasa rrjedhore.

=== Sanskrit ===
In Sanskrit, the ablative case is the fifth case (pañcamī) and has a similar function to that in Latin. Sanskrit nouns in the ablative often refer to a subject "out of" which or "from" whom something (an action, an object) has arisen or occurred: pátram vṛkṣā́t pátati 'the leaf falls from the tree'. It is also used for nouns in several other senses, as for actions occurring "because of" or "without" a certain noun, indicating distance or direction. When it appears with a comparative adjective, (śreṣṭhatamam 'the best'), the ablative is used to refer to what the adjective is comparing: 'better than X'.

=== Armenian ===
The modern Armenian ablative has different markers for each main dialect, both originating from Classical Armenian. The Western Armenian affix -է -ē (definite -էն -ēn) derives from the classical singular; the Eastern Armenian affix -ից -ic’ (both indefinite and definite) derives from the classical plural. For both dialects, those affixes are singular, with the corresponding plurals being -(ն)երէ(ն) -(n)erē(n) and -(ն)երից -(n)eric’.

Western	Eastern	Gloss
մարդէ martē	մարդից mardic’	from (a) man
մարդէն martēn	մարդից mardic’	from the man
(տուն) > տանէ (dun) > danē	(տուն) > տնից (tun) > tnic’	from a house/from home
(տուն) > տանէն (dun) > danēn	(տուն) > տնից (tun) > tnic’	from the house

The ablative case has several uses. Its principal function is to show "motion away" from a location, point in space or time:

Western	Eastern	Gloss
քաղաքէն եկայ k’aġak’ēn yega	քաղաքից եկա k’aġak’ic’ yeka	I came from the city
այստեղէն հեռու կը բնակէի aysdeġēn heṙu gě pnagēi	այստեղից հեռու էի բնակվում aysteġic’ heṙu ēi bnakvum	I used to live far from here

It also shows the agent when it is used with the passive voice of the verb:

Western	Eastern	Gloss
ինծմէ միշտ կը սիրուէիր incmē mišd gě sirvēir	ինձնից միշտ սիրվում էիր injnic’ mišt sirvum ēir	You were always loved by me.
ազատիչներէն ազատեցանք azadič’nerēn azadec’ank’	ազատիչներից ազատվեցինք azatič’neric’ azatvec’ink’	We were freed by the liberators.

It is also used for comparative statements in colloquial Armenian (including infinitives and participles):

Western	Eastern	Gloss
Ի՞նչ մեղրէն անուշ է Inč’ meġrēn anuš ē	Ի՞նչն է մեղրից անուշ Inč’n ē meġric’ anuš	"What is sweeter than honey?" (proverb)
Մարիամ եղբօրմէն պզտիկ է Mariam yeġpōrmēn bzdig ē	Մարիամն եղբորից փոքր է Mariamn yeġboric’ p’ok’r ē	Mary is younger (lit. smaller) than her brother
թզեր համտեսել տեսնելէ աւելի լաւ է t’ëzer hamdesel desnelē aveli lav ē	թուզ համտեսելը տեսնելուց լավ է t’uz hamteselë tesneluc’ lav ē	Figs are better to taste than to see

Finally, it governs certain postpositions:

Western	Eastern	Gloss
ինծմէ վար incmē var	ինձնից վար indznic’ var	below me
քեզմէ վեր k’ezmē ver	քեզնից վեր k’eznic’ ver	above you
անոնցմէ ետք anonc’mē yedk’	նրանցից հետո nranc’ic’ heto	after them
մեզմէ առաջ mezmē aṙač	մեզնից առաջ meznic’ aṙadž	before us

== Uralic languages ==
=== Finnish ===
In Finnish, the ablative case is the sixth of the locative cases with the meaning "from, off, of": pöytä – pöydältä "table – off from the table". It is an outer locative case, used like the adessive and allative cases, to denote both being on top of something and "being around the place" (as opposed to the inner locative case, the elative, which means "from out of" or "from the inside of"). With the locative, the receding object was near the other place or object, not inside it.

The Finnish ablative is also used in time expressions to indicate times of something happening (kymmeneltä "at ten") as well as with verbs expressing feelings or emotions.

The Finnish ablative has the ending -lta or -ltä, depending on vowel harmony.

==== Usage ====
away from a place

- katolta: off the roof
- pöydältä: off the table
- rannalta: from the beach
- maalta: from the land
- mereltä: from the sea

from a person, object or other entity

- häneltä: from him/her/them

with the verb lähteä (stop)

- lähteä tupakalta: stop smoking (in the sense of putting out the cigarette one is smoking now, lit. 'leave from the tobacco')
- lähteä hippasilta: stop playing tag (hippa=tag, olla hippasilla=playing tag)

to smell/taste/feel/look/sound like something

- haisee pahalta: smells bad
- maistuu hyvältä: tastes good
- tuntuu kamalalta: feels awful
- näyttää tyhmältä: looks stupid
- kuulostaa mukavalta: sounds nice

=== Estonian ===
The ablative case in Estonian is the ninth case and has a similar function to that in Hungarian.

=== Hungarian ===
The ablative case in Hungarian is used to describe movement away from, as well as a concept, object, act or event originating from an object, person, location or entity. For example, one walking away from a friend who gave him a gift could say the following:

a barátomtól jövök (I am coming (away) from my friend).
a barátomtól kaptam egy ajándékot (I got a gift from my friend).

When used to describe movement away from a location, the case may only refer to movement from the general vicinity of the location and not from inside of it. Thus, a postától jövök would mean one had been standing next to the post office before, not inside the building.

When the case is used to refer to the origin of a possible act or event, the act/event may be implied while not explicitly stated, such as Meg foglak védeni a rablótól: I will defend you from the robber.

The application of vowel harmony gives two different suffixes: -tól and -től. These are applied to back-vowel and front-vowel words, respectively.

Hungarian has a narrower delative case, similar to ablative, but more specific: movement off/from a surface of something, with suffixes -ról and -ről.

== Turkic languages ==
=== Azerbaijani ===
The ablative in Azerbaijani (çıxışlıq hal) is expressed through the suffixes -dan or -dən:

ev ev-dən
house house-ABL
'house' 'from/off the house'

aparmaq aparmaq-dan
carry carry-ABL
'to carry' 'from/off carrying'

=== Tatar ===
The ablative in Tatar (чыгыш килеше) is expressed through the suffixes -дан,-дән, -тан, -тән, -нан, or -нән:

өй өй-дән
öy öydän
house house-ABL
'house' 'from/off the house'

=== Turkish ===
The ablative in Turkish (-den hali or ayrılma hali) is expressed through the suffix -den (which changes to -dan, -ten, or -tan to accommodate the vowel and voicing harmony):

ev ev-den
house house-ABL
'house' 'from/off the house'

at at-tan
horse horse-ABL
'horse' 'from/off the horse'

taşımak taşımak-tan
carry carry-ABL
'to carry' 'from/off the horse'

ses ses-ten
volume volume-ABL
'sound/volume' 'from/off sound/volume'

In some situations simple ablative can have a "because of" meaning; in these situations, ablative can be optionally followed by the postposition dolayı 'because of'.

Yüksek sesten (dolayı) rahatsız oldum.
high volume {(because of)} uneasy be-1.SG.PST.PFV.IND
I was uneasy because of high volume.

== Tungusic languages ==
=== Manchu ===
The ablative in Manchu is expressed through the suffix -ci and can also be used to express comparisons. It is usually not directly attached to its parent word.

boo-ci tuci-ke
house-ABL go.away-PAST
"(Someone) went away from the house"

=== Evenki ===
The ablative in Evenki is expressed with the suffix -duk.

e:kun-duk
who-ABL
from whom/where?

== See also ==
- Allative case
- Delative case
- Locative case
