= Juan Tomás de Rocaberti =

Catalan theologian (1627–1699)

His Grace Joan Tomàs de Rocabertí
- Archbishop of Valencia viceroys of Valencia
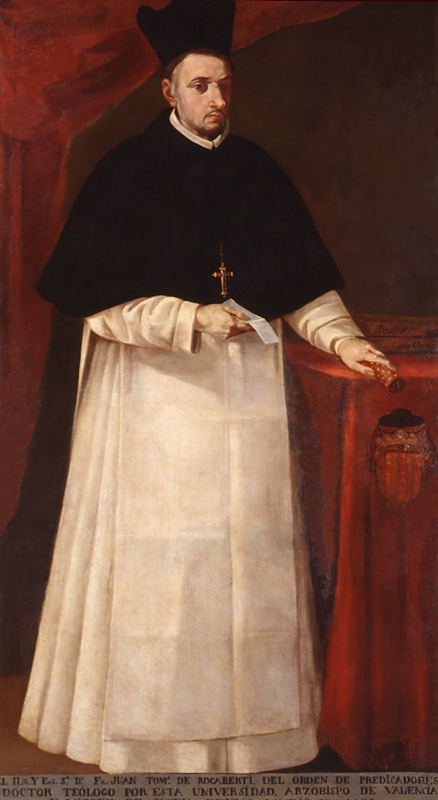
- Church: Roman Catholic
- Archdiocese: Valencia
- See: Basilica of the Assumption of Our Lady of Valencia
- Installed: 8 February 1677
- Term ended: 13 June 1699
- Predecessor: Luis Alfonso de los Cameros
- Successor: Antonio Folc de Cardona

Personal details
- Born: 4 March 1627 Perelada, Catalonia, Spain
- Died: 13 June 1699 (aged 72) Madrid, Spain
- Education: University of Girona

Juan Tomás de Rocaberti (Joan Tomàs de Rocabertí in Catalan, 4 March 1627 – 13 June 1699) was a Catalan theologian.

== Biography ==
Rocaberti was born into a noble family at Perelada, in Catalonia. Educated at Girona, he entered the Dominican convent there, receiving the habit in 1640. His success in theological studies at the convent of Valencia secured for him the chair of theology in the University of Valencia.

In 1666 he was chosen provincial of Aragon, and in 1670 the General Chapter elected him general of the order. The Dominican Vincent Contenson dedicated to him his Theologia mentis et cordis.

In 1676 he was appointed by Carlos II of Spain first Archbishop of Valencia, and then governor of that province. In 1695 he was made inquisitor-general of Spain.

He obtained the canonization of Louis Bertrand and Rose of Lima, the solemn beatification of Pius V, and the annual celebration in the order of the feast of Albert the Great and others.

Historian John Langdon-Davies described Rocaberti as a "fanatical ascetic, he never wore linen or silk, he only ate vegetables and fish, his bed was more like a martyr's rack than a high ecclesiastic's resting place."

Rocaberti died at Madrid.

== Doctrine ==
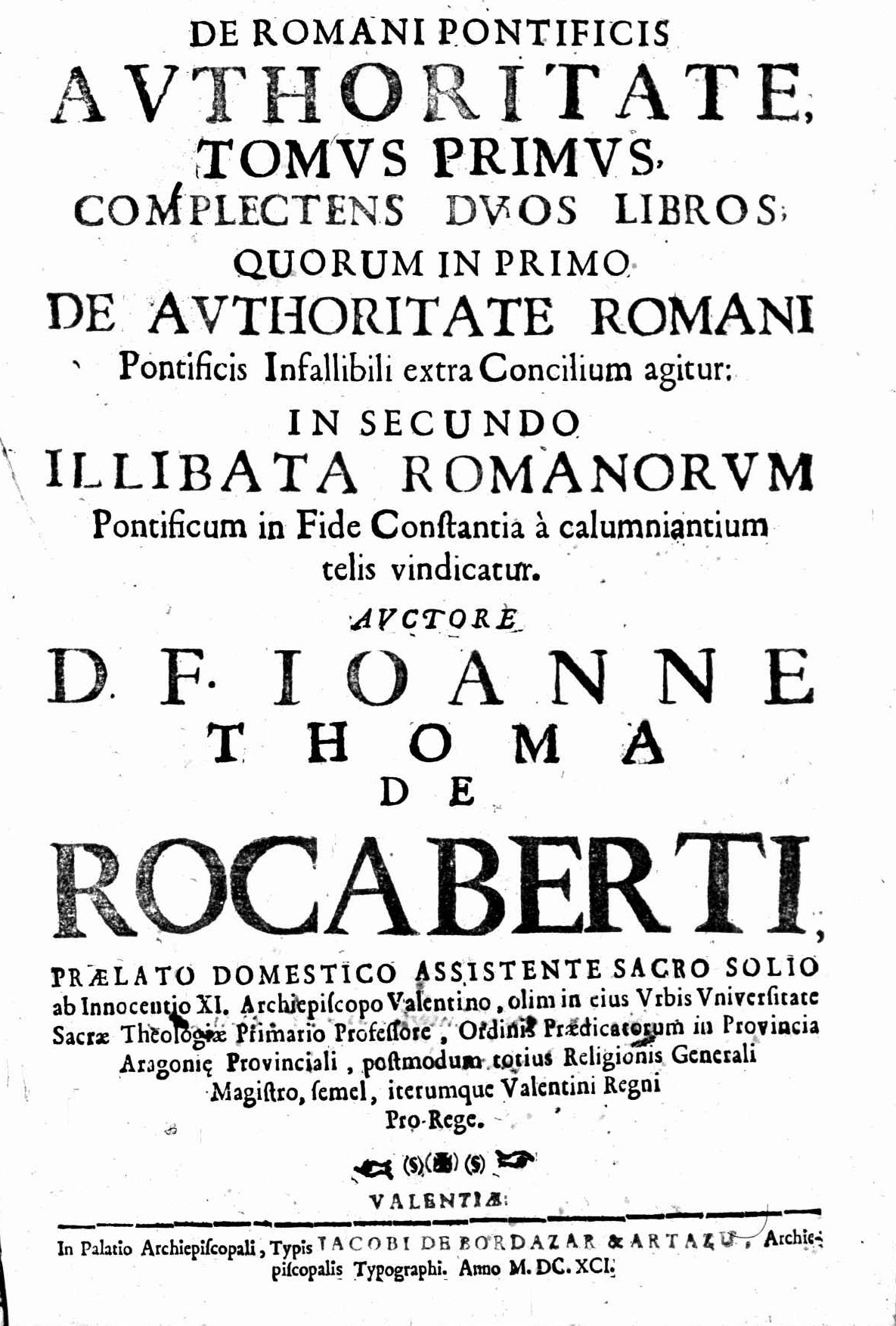
De Romani pontificis authoritate, 1691

Rocaberti is best known as an active apologist of the papacy, against Gallicans and Protestants.

His first work in the sense was De Romani pontificis in temporalibus auctoritate (3 vols., Valentia, 1691–94). His most important work is the Bibliotheca Maxima Pontificia (21 vols., Rome, 1697–1700). In this monumental work the author collected and published in alphabetical order, and in their entirety, all the important works dealing with the primacy of the Holy See from an orthodox point of view, beginning with Abraham Bzovius and ending with Zacharias Boverius. A summary is given in Hurter's Nomenclator.

== Works ==
- De Romani pontificis in temporalibus auctoritate, 3 vols., Valentia, 1691–94.
  - De Romani pontificis authoritate (in Latin). Vol. 1. Valentia: Jaime de Bordazar. 1691.
  - De Romani pontificis authoritate (in Latin). Vol. 2. Valentia: Jaime de Bordazar. 1694.
  - De Romani pontificis authoritate (in Latin). Vol. 3. Valentia: Jaime de Bordazar. 1693.
- Bibliotheca Maxima Pontificia, 21 vols., Rome, 1697–1700.

Catholic Church titles
Preceded by Giovanni Battista de Marinis	Master General of the Dominican Order; 1670–1677	Succeeded by Antonio de Monroy
Preceded by Diego Sarmiento de Valladares	Grand Inquisitor of Spain; 1695–1699	Succeeded by Alonso Fernández de Córdoba y Aguilar
