= Giovanni Battista Audiffredi =

Italian Dominican scholar and scientist

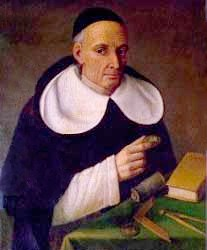
- Born: 2 February 1714; Saorge, Duchy of Savoy
- Died: 4 July 1794 (aged 80); Rome, Papal States
- Scientific career
- Fields: Astronomy

Giovanni Battista Audiffredi (2 February 1714 – 4 July 1794) was an Italian Dominican scholar and scientist.

== Life ==
Giovanni Battista Audiffredi entered the Dominican Order, and soon attracted attention by his taste for books and his talent for the exact sciences. After being occupied in various houses as professor and bibliographer, he was at length transferred to the College of St. Thomas at the Dominican convent of Santa Maria sopra Minerva, the future Pontifical University of St. Thomas Aquinas, Angelicum. He was placed in charge (1765) of the Biblioteca Casanatense, founded in 1700 by Cardinal Girolamo Casanata.

== Works ==
Audiffredi published a bibliographical work in four folio volumes, entitled Bibliotheca Casanatensis librorum typis impressorum, 1761–1790. The work remains unfinished, not proceeding beyond the letter L, and contains a list of his own publications. The Catalogus historico-criticus Romanarum editionum saeculi XV (Rome, 1785, quarto) was along similar lines. The more extensively planned Catalogus historico-criticus editionum Italicarum saeculi XV (ibid., 1794) was to give an account of books printed in twenty-six Italian cities, but Audiffredi did not live to complete the work. The first part, extending to the letter G, contains a short biography of the author introduced by the publisher.

Audiffredi's position enabled him to become an expert antiquarian, and he found time to cultivate his mathematical talent and to devote himself to astronomy. He built a small observatory, and at intervals busied himself with observation. The eighteenth century was much occupied with the problem of solar parallax. In 1761 and 1769 the transit of Venus were observed, and Audiffredi contributed to the work in his publication, Phaenomena coelestia observata—investigatio parallaxis solis. Exercitatio Dadei Ruffi (anagram for Audiffredi). Alexandre Guy Pingré's subsequent discounting of Audifreddi's observations led to a scientific dispute.

The predicted reappearance in the middle of the century of Halley's Comet intensified scientific interest in cometic orbits. The epoch was favored with a number of brilliant objects of this kind, and that of 1769 distinguished itself by its great nucleus and by the tail which stretched over more than half the sky. Audiffredi took observations of the positions of the comet and published his results under the title, Dimostrazione della stazione della cometa, 1769 (1770).

== Bibliography ==
- Tentori, Paola (1962). "AUDIFFREDI, Giovanni Battista". Dizionario Biografico degli Italiani (in Italian). Vol. 4: Arconati–Bacaredda. Rome: Istituto dell'Enciclopedia Italiana. OCLC 883370.
