= Biblioteca Casanatense =

Library in Rome, Italy

Coordinates: 41.8987°N 12.4794°E

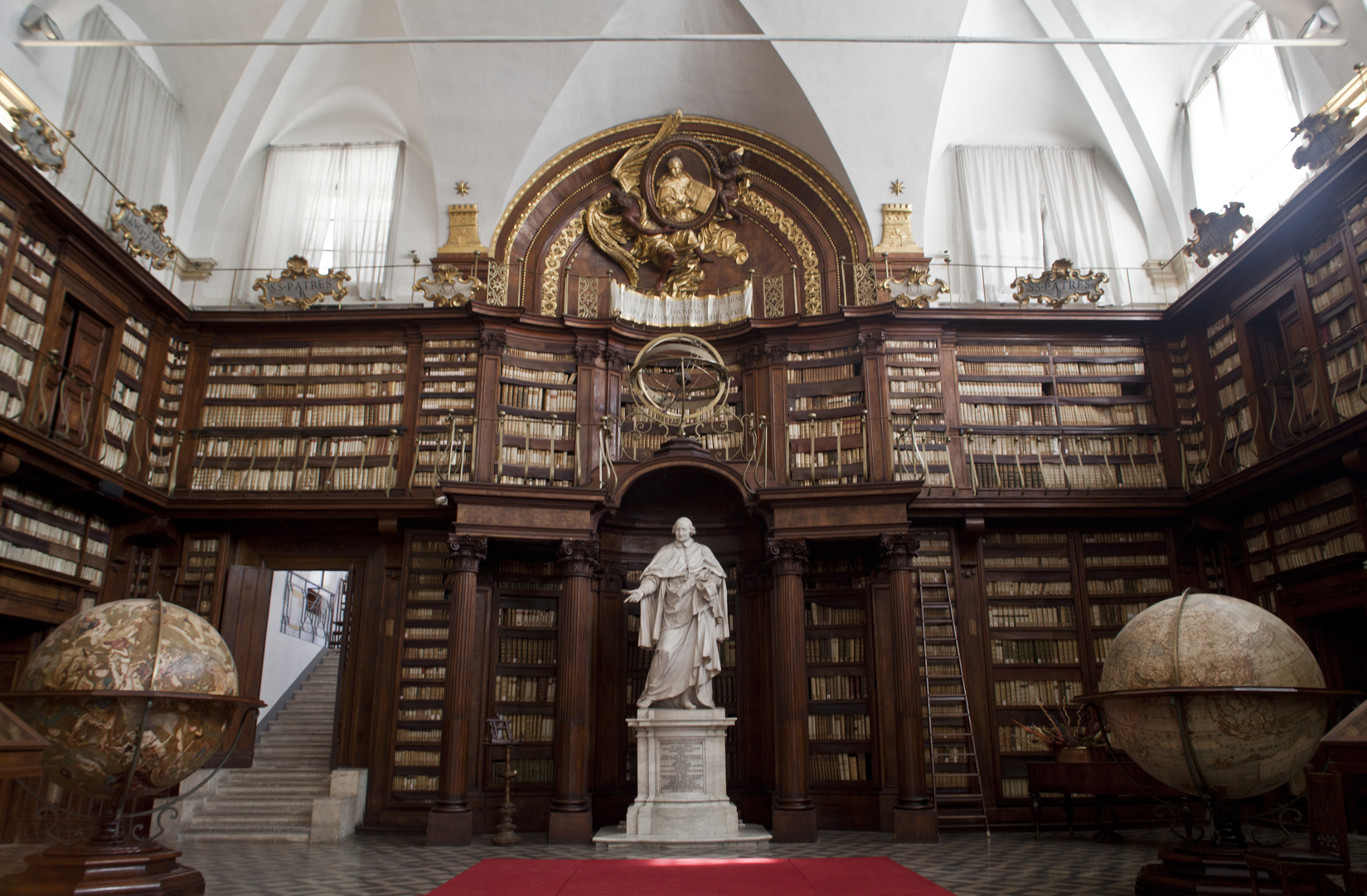
Interior of the Biblioteca Casanatense with the statue of Cardinal Girolamo Casanate

The Biblioteca Casanatense is a large historic library in Rome, Italy, named in honour of Cardinal Girolamo Casanate (1620–1700) whose private library is at its roots.

== History ==
The library was established in 1701 by Antonin Cloche, the Master of the Dominicans, at their Convent of Santa Maria sopra Minerva in Rome to house the library left to them by Casanate, containing about 25,000 volumes. Casanate also left an endowment of 80,000 scudi to provide for the administration of the trust and for the acquisition of new books but not for a building. This was erected using a previous inheritance of 1655 of the library of Giambattista Castellani, chief physician of Gregory XV, together with 12,000 scudi for building a suitable edifice. One of the notable 18th century bibliographers of the library was Giovanni Battista Audiffredi.

According to Casanate's will, the new library should be accessible to the public six hours daily, apart from feast-days. In addition to the library staff he provided for a college (theologi casanatenses) of six Dominicans with a doctor's degree of different nationalities (Italian, French, Spanish, German, English, Polish). Aided by the resources of the library, they were to devote themselves to the defence and propagation of Catholic doctrine. Moreover, two professors were to lecture regularly on texts St Thomas Aquinas, particularly his Summa Theologica.

In 1872, the library was nationalized, but the Dominicans were left in charge until 1884. It is now administered by the Ministry of Culture.

The entrance to the Casanatense is located at Via di Sant'Ignazio, 52.

=== Statue of Casanate ===
To honour his friend, Cloche had a statue of Cardinal Casanate made by his favourite sculptor Pierre Le Gros the Younger. Upon completion in 1708, it was placed on top of the staircase leading up from Santa Maria sopra Minerva at the library's old entrance. The original concept was that Casanate should greet the visitor on his way out of the library, ready to accompany him for a while to discuss what he learned with the help of his books.

As it soon became evident that more capacity was needed, the building was enlarged and the statue moved into its now much larger reading room by 1721. There, Casanate is framed by a noble wooden structure specifically constructed for that purpose by the Dominicans' architect Antonio Maria Borione and surmounted by the figure of St. Thomas Aquinas by the sculptor Bernardino Cametti.

What remains of the statue's original setting are mostly two putti above the niche in the staircase. As this is now outside the library's limits, it is only accessible via the church of Santa Maria sopra Minerva.

== Collection ==
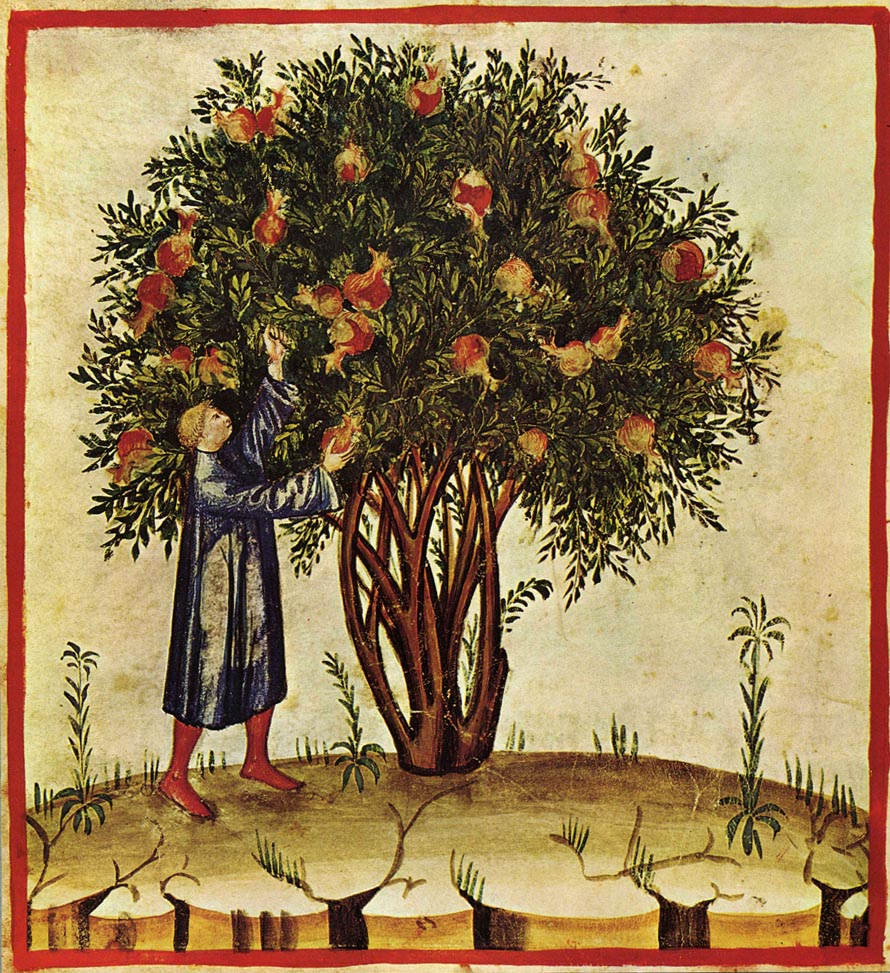
Tacuinum Sanitatis, Lombardy, late 14th century (Biblioteca Casanatense).

Today the Library's collection contains approximately 400,000 volumes, about 6,000 manuscripts and 2,200 incunabula. An inscription records the formal permission of Clement XI to collect books by heretical authors.

The Casanatense still preserves 1125 manuscript volumes of opinions, reports, and statements (voti, relazioni, posizioni) concerning matters treated in the various Congregations to which Casanate belonged. His curial duties did not prevent him from taking an interest in letters and the sciences. He was on friendly terms and corresponded with the learned men of his day. Among those whom he encouraged most was Lorenzo Alessandro Zaccagni, whom he induced to publish a collection of materials for the ancient history of the Greek and Latin Churches, Collectanea monumentorum veterum Ecclesiæ græcæ et latinæ

Amongst the library's possessions are 64 Greek codices (15 of them the gift of Casanate), and 230 Hebrew texts (rolls and books), among which are 5 Samaritan codices. It holds medieval manuscripts, including biblical manuscripts (e.g. Minuscule 395). There is a total of 2036 (books printed before 1500).

There is also a large collection of Roman governmental proclamations (bandi, editti) from 1500 to 1870, and comedies of the seventeenth and eighteenth centuries.
