= Antonio de Monroy =

Most Reverend Antonio de Monroy
- Archbishop of Santiago de Compostela
- Church: Catholic Church
- Archdiocese: Archdiocese of Santiago de Compostela
- In office: 1685–1715
- Predecessor: Francisco de Aguiar y Seijas y Ulloa
- Successor: Juan de Ortega Cano Montañez y Patiño
- Previous post: Master of the Order of Preachers (1677–1686)

Orders
- Consecration: 11 June 1685 by Paluzzo Paluzzi Altieri Degli Albertoni

Personal details
- Born: 6 July 1634 Santiago de Querétaro, Mexico
- Died: 27 November 1715 (aged 81) Santiago de Compostela, Spain

Antonio de Monroy, O.P. or Antonio de Monroy y Hijar (6 July 1634 – 7 November 1715) was a Roman Catholic prelate who served as Archbishop of Santiago de Compostela (1685–1715), Bishop of Michoacán (1680) and the Master of the Order of Preachers (1677–1686).

== Biography ==
Antonio de Monroy was born in Santiago de Querétaro, Mexico and ordained a priest in the Order of Preachers. He served as a missionary in Mexico and later represented Mexico at the Dominican chapter of 1677 where he encouraged the Rosary Confraternities. In 1677, he was appointed Master General of Order of Friars Preachers. The probabilist controversy raged during his mastership. On 4 June 1685, he was appointed during the papacy of Pope Innocent XI as Archbishop of Santiago de Compostela. On 11 June 1685, he was consecrated bishop by Paluzzo Paluzzi Altieri Degli Albertoni, Cardinal-Priest of Santa Maria in Trastevere. In 1686, he resigned as Master General of Order of Friars Preachers. He served as Archbishop of Santiago de Compostela until his death on 7 November 1715. While bishop, he was the principal consecrator of Vincenzo Ludovico Gotti, Titular Patriarch of Jerusalem (1688).

Catholic Church titles
Preceded by Juan Tomás de Rocaberti	Master of the Order of Preachers; 1677–1686	Succeeded by Antonin Cloche
Preceded by Francisco de Aguiar y Seijas y Ulloa	Bishop of Michoacán; 1680	Succeeded by Juan de Ortega Cano Montañez y Patiño
Preceded by Francisco de Seijas Losada	Archbishop of Santiago de Compostela; 1685–1715	Succeeded by Luis de Salcedo y Azcona
