= Minuscule 395 =

- New Testament manuscript
- Text: Gospels
- Date: 12th century
- Script: Greek
- Now at: Biblioteca Casanatense
- Size: 28 cm by 20.9 cm
- Type: Byzantine text-type
- Category: V
- Note: marginalia

Minuscule 395 (in the Gregory-Aland numbering), ε 216 (Soden), is a Greek minuscule manuscript of the New Testament, on parchment. Paleographically it has been assigned to the 12th century. It contains marginalia.

== Description ==
The codex contains the text of the four Gospels on 170 parchment leaves (28 cm by 20.9 cm). The text is written in two columns per page, in 25 lines per page. The text of John 1:19-25 was supplied by a later hand in the 18th century.

The text is divided according to the κεφαλαια (chapters), whose numbers are given at the margin, and their τιτλοι (titles) at the top of the pages. There is also a division according to the Ammonian Sections (in Mark 234 Sections, 16:9), with references to the Eusebian Canons (written below Ammonian Section numbers).

It contains the tables of the κεφαλαια (tables of contents) before each Gospel, pictures, and marginal corrections.

It is a palimpsest. The text of minuscule 395 is the upper text of the palimpsest. The lower text is unidentified, written in two columns with 30 lines in columns.

== Text ==
The Greek text of the codex is a representative of the Byzantine text-type. Hermann von Soden classified it to the textual family I^{r} (similar to Λ group). Aland placed it in Category V.

According to the Claremont Profile Method it belongs to the textual cluster 490 in Luke 1, Luke 10, and Luke 20.

== History ==
The manuscript was bought about 1765 A.D. The manuscript was added to the list of New Testament manuscripts by Scholz (1794–1852). C. R. Gregory saw it in 1886.

The manuscript is currently housed at the Biblioteca Casanatense (165) in Rome.

== See also ==
- List of New Testament minuscules
- Biblical manuscript
- Textual criticism
