= Bárbara Coronel =

Spanish stage actress

Bárbara Coronel (c. 1643–1691), was a Spanish stage performer. Coronel was one of the more famous and popular performers of the era, known and celebrated for acting in masculine acting and style, often performing male parts. In fact, Coronel is reputed to have also dressed and behaved as a man in day-to-day life.

Coronel was born to Agustin and Maria Coronel, who were also actors. Coronel began acting when aged only 11, and eventually rose to managing a company of actors.

Coronel was involved in several scandals which attracted a lot of attention. In the most infamous scandal, Coronel was accused of the murder of Francisco Jalón, who was Coronel's husband. Shortly before Coronel would have been executed for the crime, Coronel's uncle, the actor Juan Rana, made a dramatic appeal, which successfully convinced the Inquisition to reverse the charges.
