= Boverius =

Giovanni Boveri (Boverius) (Saluzzo, 1568-Genoa, 1638) was an Italian jurist, who became a Capuchin Friar Minor, taking the name Zacharias. He is known as a historian and theologian. According to the Catholic Encyclopedia he was a “man of great learning not only as an historian, but as a controversial writer”.

== Works ==
- Orthodoxa consultatio de ratione verae fidei et religionis amplectenda (Cologne, 1626)
- Annales Ordinis Minorum Capuccinorum (Lyon, 1632)

== See also ==
- Boveri (disambiguation page)
