= Francis Mezger =

Francis Mezger (25 October 1632 – 11 December 1701) was an Austrian Benedictine academic and writer, of St. Peter's Archabbey, Salzburg.

== Life ==
Mezger was born at Ingolstadt. He took vows in 1651, and was ordained priest in 1657. He taught philosophy at the University of Salzburg in 1659, and became regent of the convictus and secretary of the university in 1661. He taught philosophy again from 1663 to 1665; and then moral theology until 1668.

From 1669 to 1688 he taught various branches at the Bavarian monastery of Ettal and at his own monastery. From 1688 until his death he was master of novices and director of clerics at his monastery. He died at Salzburg.

He wrote the following philosophical treatises:

- "Philosophia rationalis rationibus explicata" (Salzburg, 1660);
- "Anima rationibus philosophicis animata et explicata" (ib., 1661);
- "Philosophia naturals rationibus naturalibus elucidata" (ib., 1661);
- "Manuale philosophicum" (ib., 1665);
- "Homomicrocosmus" (ib., 1665).

The following are some of his translations:

- "Philosophia sacra" (ib., 1678), from the French of the Parisian Capuchin Ivo;
- "Heiliges Benediktiner-Jahr" (2 volumes, Munich 1690), from the Latin;
- "Dioptra politices religiosæ" (Salzburg, 1694), and "Exercitia spiritualia" (ib., 1693), both from the French of the Maurist Joachim le Contat;
- "Succinctæ meditationes christianæ" (4 vols., ib., 1695), from the French of the Maurist Claude Martin;
- "Via regia studiosæ juventutis ad veram sapientiam" (Frankfort, 1699), from the Italian; and a few others.
