= Antoine Benoist (painter) =

French painter and sculptor (1632–1717)

Antoine Benoist

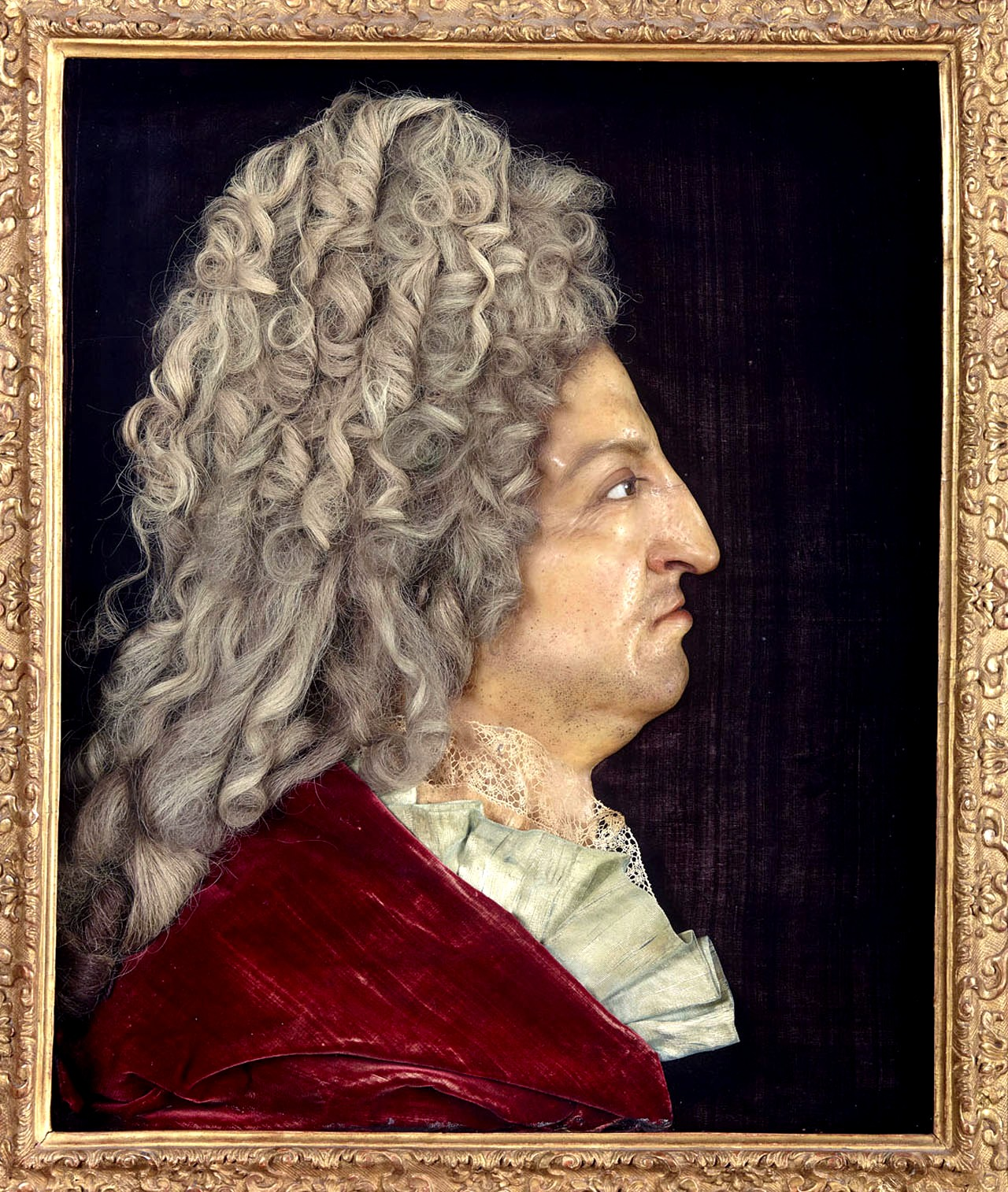
"Portrait of Louis at 68, Seven Years Before His Death". Wax relief with glass, hair, silk and velour. 1706. Palace of Versailles

Antoine Benoist (24 February 1632, Joigny, Champagne – 8 April 1717) was a French painter and sculptor who served as personal painter to King Louis XIV. He was accepted as a member of the Académie Royale, Paris in 1681.

Benoist's fame grew after he exhibited forty-three wax figurines of the French Royal Circle at his residence in Paris. Thereafter, the king authorized the figurines to be shown throughout France. His work became so highly regarded that James II of England invited him to visit England in 1684. There he executed works of the English king and members of his royal court.

Today, Antoine Benoist's work can be viewed among the collections of the Bibliothèque Nationale in Paris and the Château de Versailles.

== Bibliography ==
- Benoist-Charleville Family Papers, 1739–1949, Missouri Historical Society Archives
- Histoire des grandes familles françaises du Canada : ou Aperçu sur le chevalier Benoist et quelques familles contemporaines, Daniel, François, 1867
- Grove Dictionary of Art
- Ann Gulbransen's genealogy site, www.gulbangi.com – All material used by permission
- John F. Benoist family documents
