= François-Séraphin Régnier-Desmarais =

French diplomat and writer (1632–1713)

François-Séraphin Régnier-Desmarais (13 August 1632, Paris – 6 September 1713, Paris) was a French ecclesiastic, grammarian, diplomat and poet in French, Spanish and Latin. He also translated Alphonsus Rodriguez's The Practice of Christian Perfection and several works by Anacreon, Homer and Cicero. He was born in Paris.
