= Juan Carlos Boveri =

Argentine author

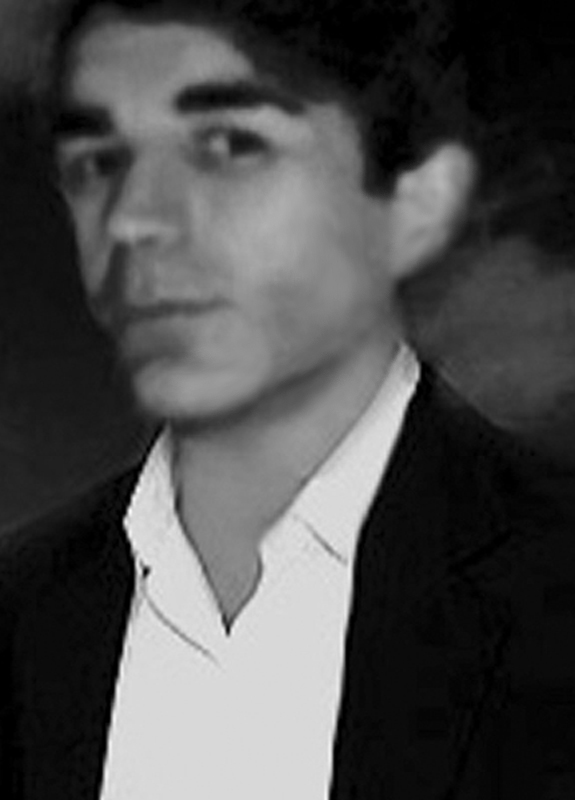
Juan Carlos Boveri en 1983

Juan Carlos Boveri (San Nicolás de los Arroyos, Buenos Aires, September 14, 1950 - October 6, 2025) is an Argentine author of novel and short stories, as well as a psychologist, sociologist and cultural anthropologist. His works is characterized by its originality and depth, as well as a criticism of human society.

== Works ==
- Dios se quedó dormido
- Límites
- Ecos de otro
- Monólogo a una mujer dormida
- Análisis del gas humano
- No hicimos nada por los perros
- Azul la que cuenta historias
- El dedo de Schumann
