= Theodor Boveri =

German zoologist and comparative anatomist

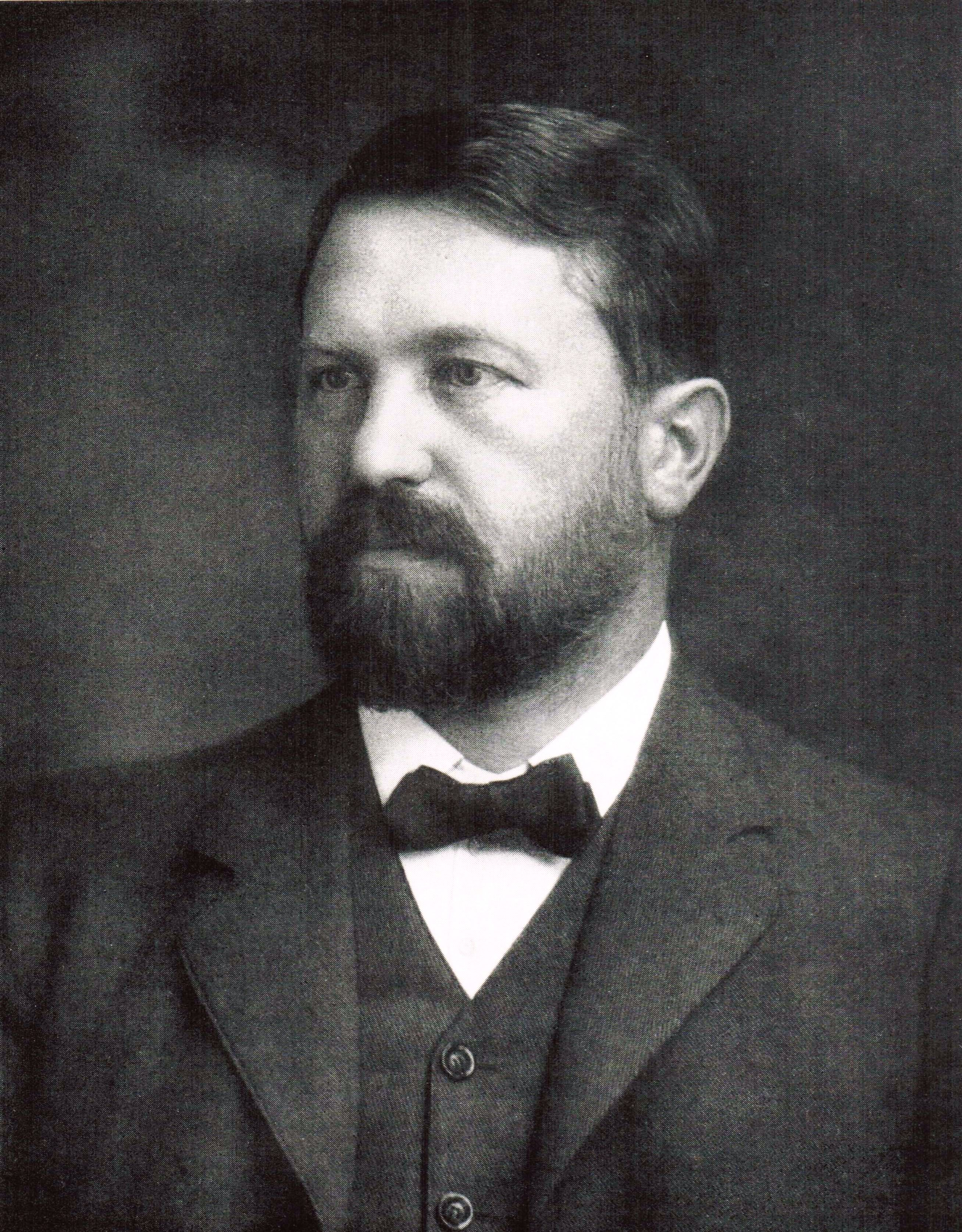
- Born: 12 October 1862; Bamberg, Kingdom of Bavaria
- Died: 15 October 1915 (aged 53); Würzburg, German Empire
- Known for: Embryonic development Boveri–Sutton chromosome theory Centrosome; Chromosome theory of cancer
- Spouse: Marcella Boveri
- Children: Margret Boveri
- Scientific career
- Fields: Genetics, Cell biology

Theodor Heinrich Boveri (12 October 1862 – 15 October 1915) was a German zoologist, comparative anatomist and co-founder of modern cytology. He was notable for the first hypothesis regarding cellular processes that cause cancer, and for describing chromatin diminution in nematodes. His brother was industrialist Walter Boveri. Boveri was married to the American biologist Marcella O'Grady (1863–1950). Their daughter Margret Boveri (1900–1975) became one of the best-known journalists in post-World War II Germany.

== Work ==
Using an optical microscope, Boveri examined the processes involved in the fertilization of the animal egg cell; his favorite research objects were the nematode Parascaris and sea urchins.

Boveri's work with sea urchins showed that it was necessary to have all chromosomes present in order for proper embryonic development to take place. This discovery was an important part of the Boveri–Sutton chromosome theory. He also discovered, in 1888, the importance of the centrosome for the formation of the spindle during mitosis in animal cells, which he described as the especial organ of cell division. Boveri also discovered the phenomenon of chromatin diminution during embryonic development of the nematode Parascaris.

Building on Carl Rabl's knowledge that chromosomes are also present between two nuclear divisions in the cell nucleus, he developed the concept of chromosome individuality, i.e. the assumption that chromosomes retain their individuality during interphase. Through long experiments on sea urchin eggs, he was also able to prove that the various chromosomes contain different genetic makeup.

He also reasoned in 1902 that a cancerous tumor begins with a single cell in which the makeup of its chromosomes becomes scrambled, causing the cells to divide uncontrollably. He proposed carcinogenesis was the result of aberrant mitoses and uncontrolled growth caused by radiation, physical or chemical insults or by microscopic pathogens. His assumption was initially rejected by medical professionals; it was only later that researchers such as Thomas Hunt Morgan in 1915 demonstrated that Boveri was correct.

Boveri also described the structure of the kidneys in Amphioxus (Cephalochordata).
