= Antoine Massoulié =

French Dominican theologian

Antoine Massoulié (born at Toulouse, 28 October 1632; died at Rome, 23 January 1706) was a French Dominican theologian. He was uncompromising against Quietism, and Molinism.

== Life ==
At an early age he entered the order of St. Dominic, in which he held many important offices; but above all these, he prized study, teaching, and writing. He refused a bishopric and asked to be relieved of distracting duties. It was said that he knew by heart the Summa of Thomas Aquinas.

He devoted himself with such earnestness to the study of Greek and Hebrew that he could converse fluently in both of these languages. His knowledge of Hebrew enabled him to overcome in public debate two rabbis, one at Avignon in 1659, the other at Florence in 1695. The latter became a Christian, his conversion being ascribed by Massoulié to prayer more than to successful disputation.

Massoulié was a professor of theology at the Roman College of St. Thomas, the future Pontifical University of St. Thomas Aquinas, Angelicum.

== Works ==
His published works and some unpublished manuscripts (preserved in the Casanatense Library at Rome) may be divided into two classes: those written in defence of the Thomistic doctrine of physical promotion, relating to God's action on free agents; and those written against the Quietists, whom he strenuously opposed, both by attacking their teaching and also by explaining doctrine according to the principles of Thomas Aquinas.

His principal works are:

- Divus Thomas sui interpres de divina motione et libertate creata (Rome, 1692)
- Oratio ad explicandam Summan theologicam D. Thomae (Rome, 1701)
- Méditationes de S.Thomas sur les trois vies, purgative, illuminative et unitive (Toulouse, 1678)
- Traité de la véritable oraison, où les erreurs des Quiétistes sont réfutées (Paris, 1699)
- Traité de l'amour de Dieu (Paris, 1703)

== Notes ==
Attribution
