= Girolamo Casanate =

Italian Cardinal

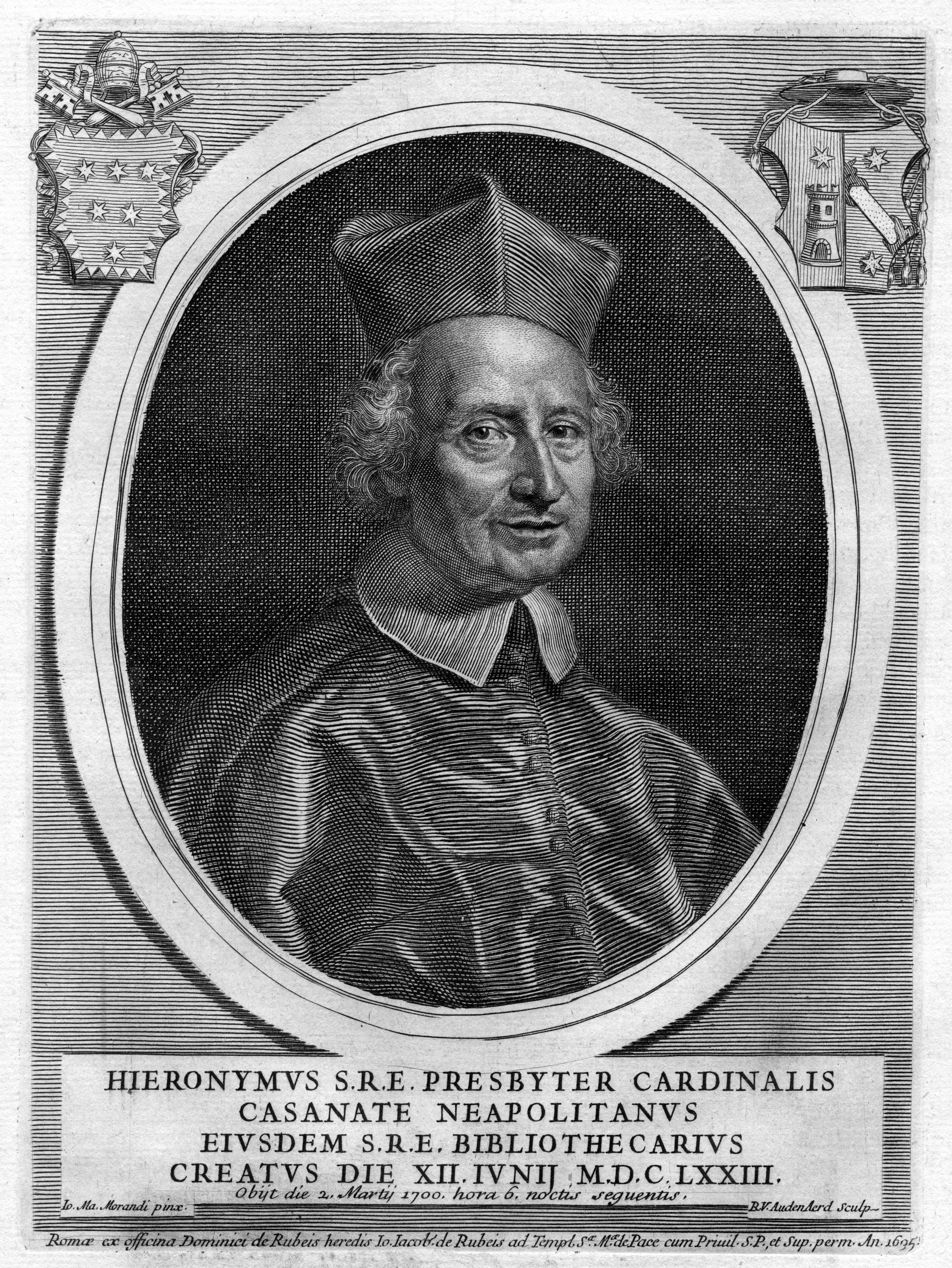
- Born: 13 February 1620; Naples
- Died: 3 March 1700 (aged 80); Rome
- Occupation: Librarian, inquisitor
- Position held: Prefect of the Vatican Library (1693–), cardinal (1673–)

Girolamo Casanate (historic spelling variations include Casanata and Casanatta) (13 February 1620 in Naples – 3 March 1700 in Rome) was an Italian Cardinal.

== Biography ==
His father, Tommaso Casanatta, was a member of the supreme council of the Kingdom of Naples. Girolamo studied law at the university of his native town and practised in the courts for some time. Eventually he gave up the promises of a secular career and entered the service of the Catholic Church, in deference to the advice of Cardinal Pamphili whom he had met on a visit to Rome. When that cardinal became pope as Innocent X, Casanate was made private chamberlain and soon advanced rapidly in the ecclesiastical career, becoming in turn Governor of Sabina, Fabriano, Ancona, and Camerino. In the last-named city, he became a close friend of its bishop, Emilio Altieri, afterwards Pope Clement X. In 1658, Pope Alexander VII sent him as inquisitor to Malta, whence he was shortly recalled to Rome and made prelate of the Consulta and active member of the courts known as the Segnatura di Grazia and the Segnatura di Giustizia.

He was Consultor of the Congregation of Rites and of Propaganda, and governor of the conclave that chose the successor of Alexander VII; under Clement IX he was made assessor of the Holy Office (Congregation of the Inquisition). He was appointed secretary of the Congregation of Bishops and Regulars by Clement X, and 13 June 1673, was named Cardinal-Deacon of the Title of Santa Maria in Porticu, and later (1686) Cardinal-Priest of the Title of San Silvestro in Capite. In 1693, Innocent XII bestowed on him the office of Librarian of the Vatican (Bibliotecario di Santa Romana Chiesa).

He held many offices which required profound knowledge of numerous doctrinal, disciplinary, and political questions brought before the Holy See in the latter half of the seventeenth century. Among them were controversies concerning Quietism (Miguel de Molinos, Fénelon, Madame Guyon); the Gallican Liberties including Louis XIV 1673 assertion of the right of Régale and his Four Articles of 1682; and the Chinese Rites controversy between the Jesuits and the Dominicans and other orders.

On his death-bed he was assisted by two Dominicans: Antonin Cloche (the general of the order) and Antoine Massoulié. He was buried in the Basilica of St. John Lateran, though his heart was deposited in Santa Maria sopra Minerva, the church of the Dominicans, to whom he was always warmly attached, and who looked on him as their benefactor.

Immediately after Casanate's death, Cloche commissioned his tomb in the Lateran basilica from Pierre Le Gros the Younger, which was inaugurated in 1703.

== Biblioteca Casanatense ==
Casanate's chief service to learning, especially theology, was the Biblioteca Casanatense, founded and endowed by him. During his life he had collected about 25,000 books which he left to Santa Maria sopra Minerva, together with an endowment of 80,000 scudi for administration and the acquisition of new books.

He also provided funds for a college (theologi casanatenses) of six Dominicans of different nationalities (Italian, French, Spanish, German, English, Polish) and two professors who would regularly lecture on texts by Thomas Aquinas, particularly the Summa Theologica.

To honour his friend, Cloche also had a statue of Casanate made by Le Gros which, in 1708, was placed outside the old entrance to the library but shortly later moved into the enlarged reading room.

== College of St. Thomas ==
To foster the study of Greek, Hebrew and Dogmatic Theology, Casanate also endowed 4 chairs of learning at the College of St. Thomas (the future Pontifical University of St. Thomas Aquinas, Angelicum) which was at the times also attached to Santa Maria sopra Minerva.
