= Kaspar von Stieler =

German soldier, poet, and linguist (1632–1707)

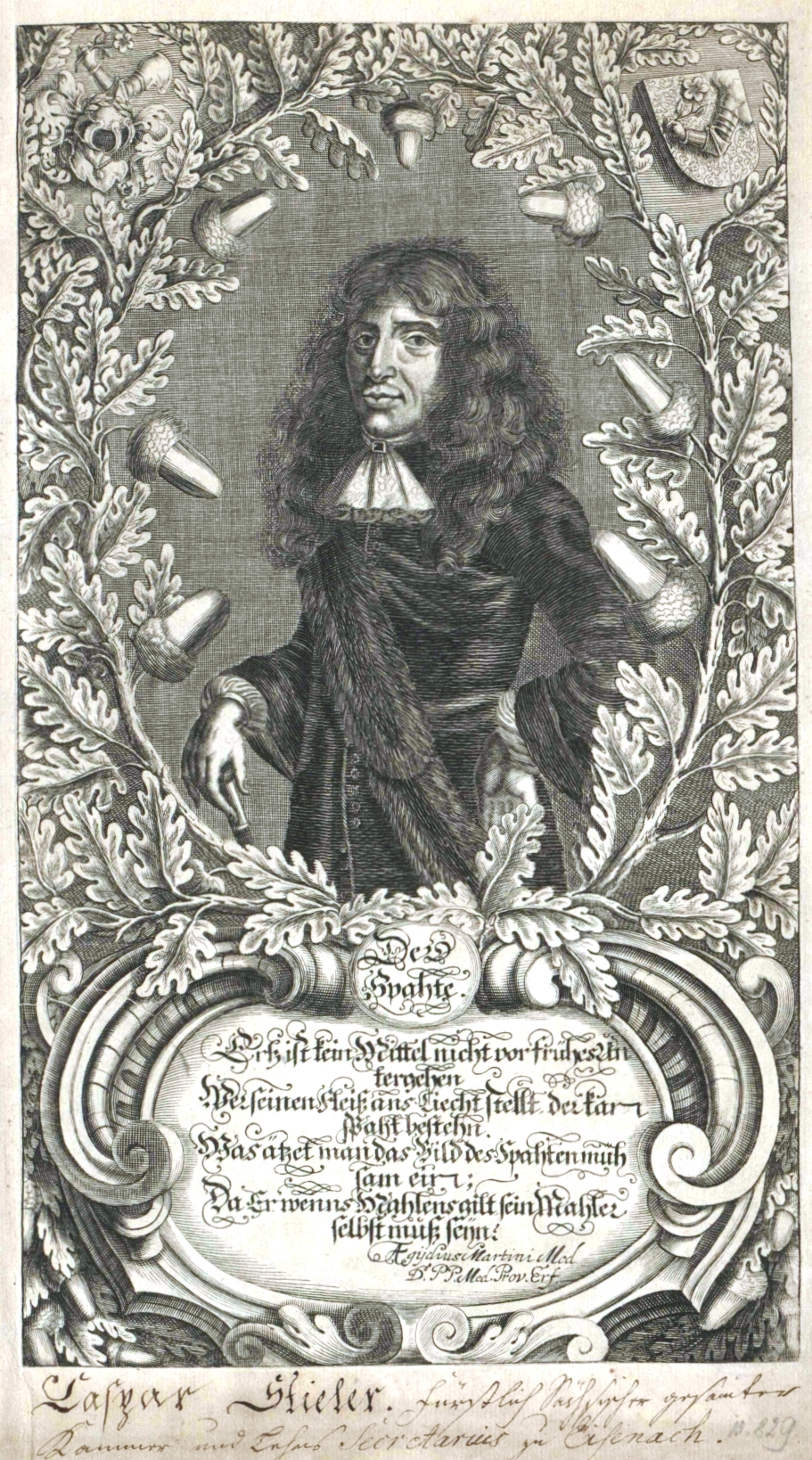
Portrait of Kaspar von Stieler. Engraving from his work Der Teutsche Advokat

Kaspar von Stieler (2 August 1632 – 24 June 1707), also called Caspar Stieler, was a soldier-poet and later a linguist. He expressed the feelings of the soldiers of the Thirty Years War in his poetry.
