= Marcella Boveri =

American biologist

- Marcella Boveri in 1897
- Born: Marcella O'Grady; October 7, 1863; Boston
- Died: October 24, 1950 (aged 87); Trenton, New Jersey
- Education: Massachusetts Institute of Technology, Harvard University
- Known for: Contributions to comparative zoology and embryology; first woman graduate of Massachusetts Institute of Technology
- Spouse: Theodor Boveri
- Children: Margret Boveri
- Awards: Fellowship in Biology, Bryn Mawr College, 1887-1889
- Scientific career
- Fields: Genetics, Marine Biology
- Workplaces: Bryn Mawr College, Vassar College, Albertus Magnus College

Marcella Boveri (née O'Grady; October 7, 1863 – October 24, 1950) was an American biologist. She was married to the German biologist Theodor Boveri (1862–1915). Their daughter Margret Boveri (1900–1975) became one of the best-known post-war German journalists.

== Life ==
She was born Marcella O'Grady in Boston, the daughter of Irish immigrants. She attended Girls' High School in Boston. She studied with William Thompson Sedgwick at the Massachusetts Institute of Technology, where she became the first woman to receive a degree in biology from MIT. After she completed her post-graduate studies in Harvard University O'Grady worked as an assistant to the zoologist Edmund Beecher Wilson at Bryn Mawr College in Pennsylvania. She was awarded the Fellowship in Biology for 1887-1889 for advanced study at Bryn Mawr College. In 1889 she transferred as associate professor to Vassar College, and became full professor there in 1893. During this time O'Grady was very much in favour of encouraging women to study and advance themselves in higher education.

In 1896 she visited Würzburg, at a time when women were not allowed to study at university in Germany, where she met her future husband. She started a fresh course of studies there, the only woman at the university at that time, working together with Theodor Boveri. They married on 4 October 1897 at the Convent of the Good Shepherd in Troy, New York. Her daughter Margret was born on 14 August 1900.

Much of her work was done in collaboration with her husband and her career followed a pattern different from women scientists of her generation.

Her husband died in 1915, from tuberculosis, which Marcella was convinced was aggravated by stress due to the First World War. She returned to the United States in 1925, where she worked at Albertus Magnus College until 1942. While there she translated The Origin of Malignant Tumors, an important book which she had co-written with her husband. She died in 1950 in Trenton, New Jersey.
