= Margret Boveri =

German journalist (1900–1975)

Margret Boveri

Margret Antonie Boveri (Würzburg, 14 August 1900 – Berlin, 6 July 1975) was one of the best-known German journalists and writers of the post-World War II period. She was a recipient of the German Critics' Prize and the Bundesverdienstkreuz.

== Early life ==
In 1900, Margret Boveri was born in Würzburg, Germany, the daughter of German biologist Theodor Boveri and American biologist Marcella O'Grady Boveri. Margret developed an early interest in foreign cultures and politics after spending time with people from various countries at a zoology station in Naples. Her father died in 1915 and her mother returned to the USA in 1925.

Due to a lack of a university programme in foreign policy in Germany then, Margret studied German, history, philosophy, and English at the University of Würzburg. In 1932, she completed her doctorate at Berlin with a thesis on British Foreign Policy. She presented a negative view on Britain's international relations in her dissertation; she held this opinion throughout her journalistic career. Her switch to pursuing journalism instead of diplomacy and politics, she claimed was due to Adolf Hitler's rise to power in January 1933. She did not want to work closely with the Nazi regime. Initially, she intended to work with Frankfurter Zeitung. However, this was met with rejections and claims that women cannot cover politics in journalism.

== Career ==
From 1934, she worked in the Foreign Affairs section of the Berliner Tageblatt newspaper, where she was promoted by the editor, Paul Scheffer. Boveri later credited her success to Scheffer's mentorship, "It was due to Scheffer that I started to become a name." After she made a name for herself as a foreign policy expert, she started using a gender-neutral byline as Dr. M. Boveri. This was due to the traditional male domain of her beat. She noted later, "The femininity was gone. The readers sometimes asked whether I was the wife of Dr. M."

From 1939 (when the Berliner Tageblatt was banned) until 1943 she worked as foreign correspondent for the Frankfurter Zeitung newspaper in Stockholm and New York City. She was awarded the War Merit Medal by the Nazi Government in 1941; she herself was never a member of the Nationalist Socialist Party. After the USA entered the war she was interned for a time in New York, before being returned, at her own request, to Europe. In May 1942 she arrived in Lisbon, where she continued her work as correspondent for the Frankfurter Zeitung. While in Lisbon she became acquainted with the Swiss journalist Annemarie Schwarzenbach, who died shortly afterwards in an accident in Switzerland.

After the Frankfurter Zeitung was banned by the German government in 1943, Boveri returned to Berlin, where her apartment was destroyed in an air strike. She then took up work as a report writer in the German embassy in Madrid before returning to Berlin in 1944 to work as a freelance writer with the Nazi Party weekly Das Reich.

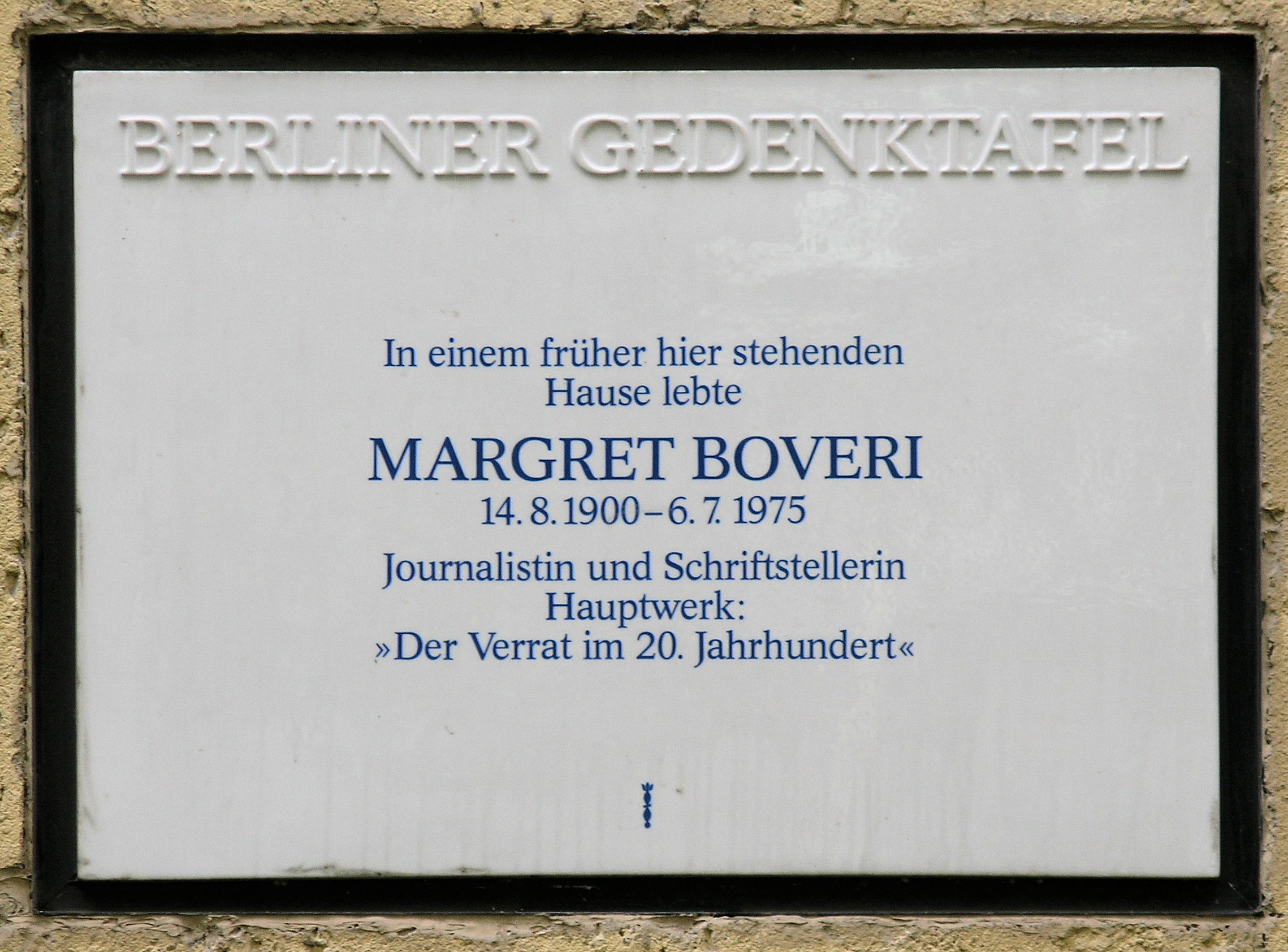
Memorial at Opitzstraße 8 in Berlin-Steglitz

After the war, Boveri disapproved of the division of Germany by the Allies into separate political zones, in which she was supported by Konrad Adenauer, and she maintained her opposition to the division of Germany until the 1960s. In 1968 she was awarded the German Critics' Prize and in 1970 the Bundesverdienstkreuz, the highest civilian honor in West Germany, for promoting understanding between East and West Germany. Among her friends and acquaintances were Wilhelm Conrad Röntgen, Theodor Heuss, Ernst von Weizsäcker, Freya von Moltke, Ernst Jünger, Carl Schmitt, Armin Mohler, Gottfried Benn und Uwe Johnson.

She died in Berlin in 1975.

== Personal life ==
Margret cherished her identity as an unconventional woman. She took flying lessons. She also owned a personal car in which she travelled through parts of Europe that people, not only women, rarely had the opportunity to visit. Just before joining Berliner Tageblatt, in 1933, she drove through Morocco, Tunisia, and Algeria. These travels constituted her first publications.

== Works ==
- Das Weltgeschehen am Mittelmeer, Zurich 1936
- Vom Minarett zum Bohrturm. Eine politische Biographie Vorderasiens, Zurich and Leipzig 1939
- Ein Auto, Wüsten, blaue Perlen. Bericht über eine Reise durch Vorderasien, Leipzig 1939
- modern edition: Wüsten, Minarette und Moscheen. Im Auto durch den alten Orient. Berlin, wjs 2005, ISBN 3-937989-06-4
- Amerika-Fibel für erwachsene Deutsche, Berlin 1946 (modern edition: Berlin (Landt) 2006, ISBN 3-938844-03-5
- 16 Fenster und 8 Türen, Berlin 1953
- Der Verrat im XX. Jahrhundert, 4 Volumes, Hamburg 1956–1960
- Wir lügen alle. Eine Hauptstadtzeitung unter Hitler, Olten and Freiburg im Breisgau 1965
- Tage des Überlebens. Berlin 1945, Munich 1968. Modern edition: Berlin, wjs 2004, ISBN 3-937989-01-3
- "Erinnerte Mutmaßungen", in: Neue Deutsche Hefte 16, 205–208, 1969
- Die Deutschen und der Status Quo, Munich 1974
- Verzweigungen. Eine Autobiographie, published by Uwe Johnson, Munich 1977
  modern edition: Frankfurt am Main, Suhrkamp 1996, ISBN 3-518-39076-7
