= Vincent Contenson =

French theologian

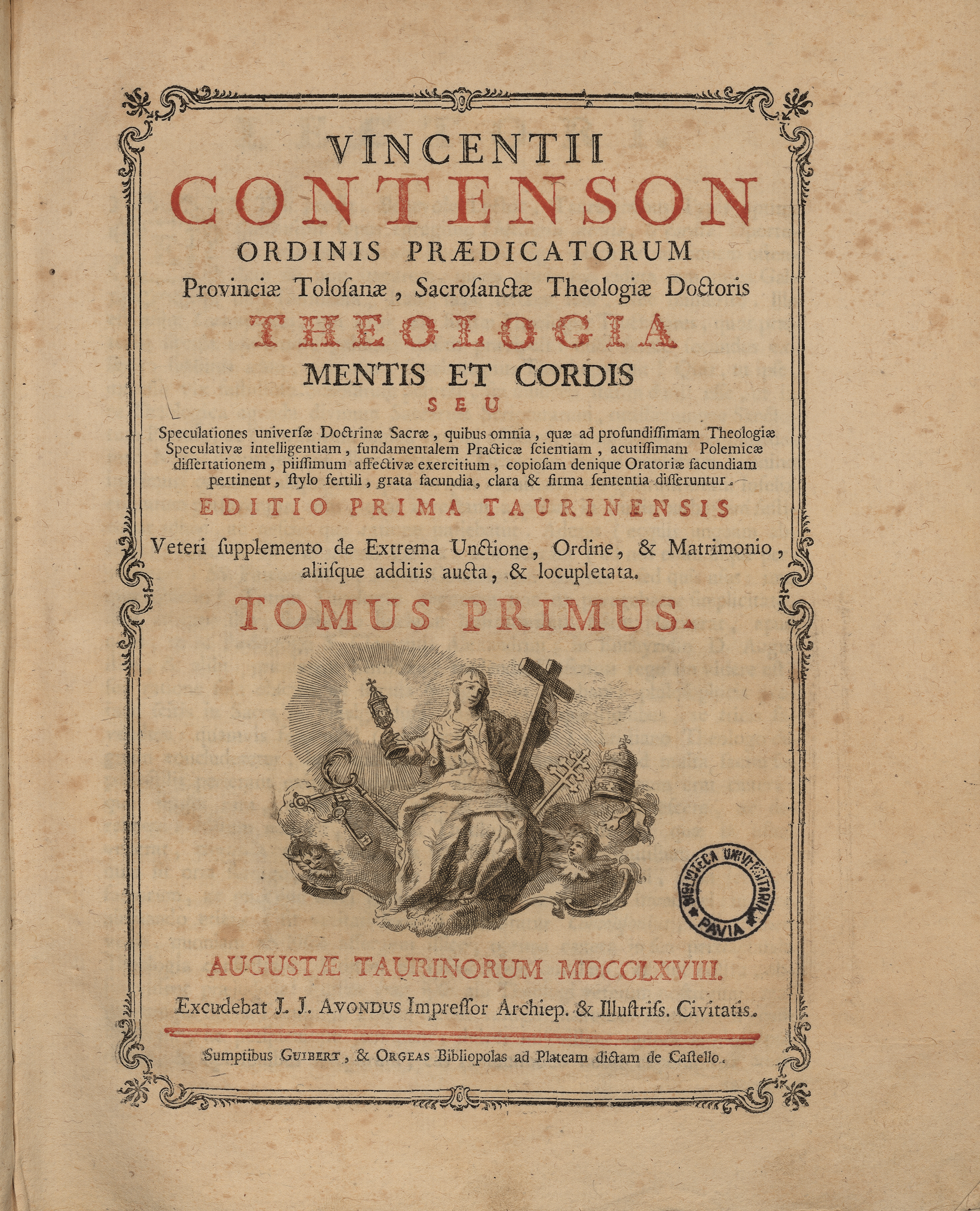
Theologia mentis et cordis, 1768

Vincent Contenson (born at Altivillare (Gers), Diocese of Condon, 1641; died Creil-sur-Oise, 26 December 1674) was a French Dominican theologian and preacher.

He was seventeen years old when he entered the Order of Preachers. He taught philosophy for a time at Albi, followed by theology at Toulouse. Afterwards, he had a brief but popular career as a preacher.

Contenson died in the pulpit at Creil, where he was giving a mission. He was buried there; his epitaph describes him as "in years a youth, mature in wisdom and in virtue venerable".

== Works ==
Contenson's major work was Theologia Mentis et Cordis, published posthumously at Lyons in nine volumes, 1681; second edition, 1687. The 1913 Catholic Encyclopedia praises its use of "illustrations and images borrowed from the Church Fathers" to enrich the "prevailing dry reasoning of Scholasticism."
