= Antoine Monnoyer =

French painter

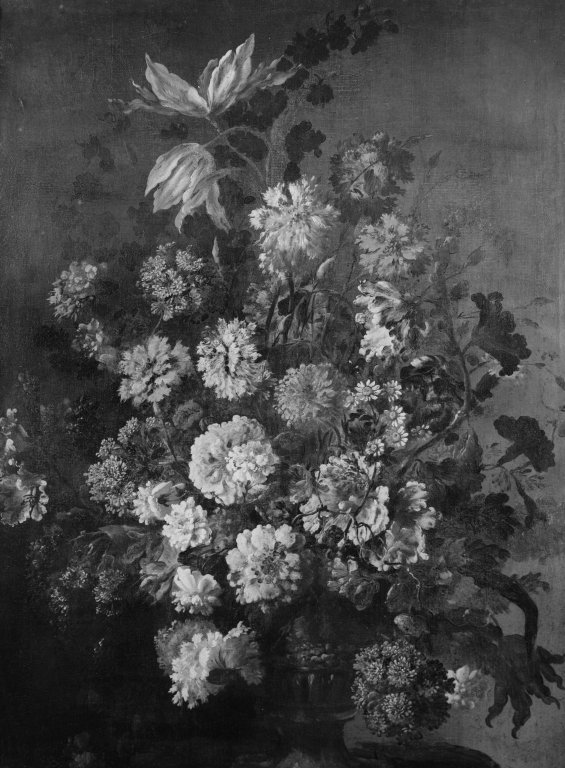
- Vase of Flowers
- Born: 1670
- Died: 1747 (aged 76–77)
- Known for: Painter

Antoine Monnoyer (1670 – 1747), was a French painter.

== Biography ==
He was born in Paris as the son and pupil of Jean-Baptiste Monnoyer. He is known for flower still lifes in the manner of his father and he was the teacher of Andien de Clermont. He is sometimes referred to as Baptiste (le jeune). He died in Saint-Germain-en-Laye.
