= Jean-Baptiste Monnoyer =

French painter

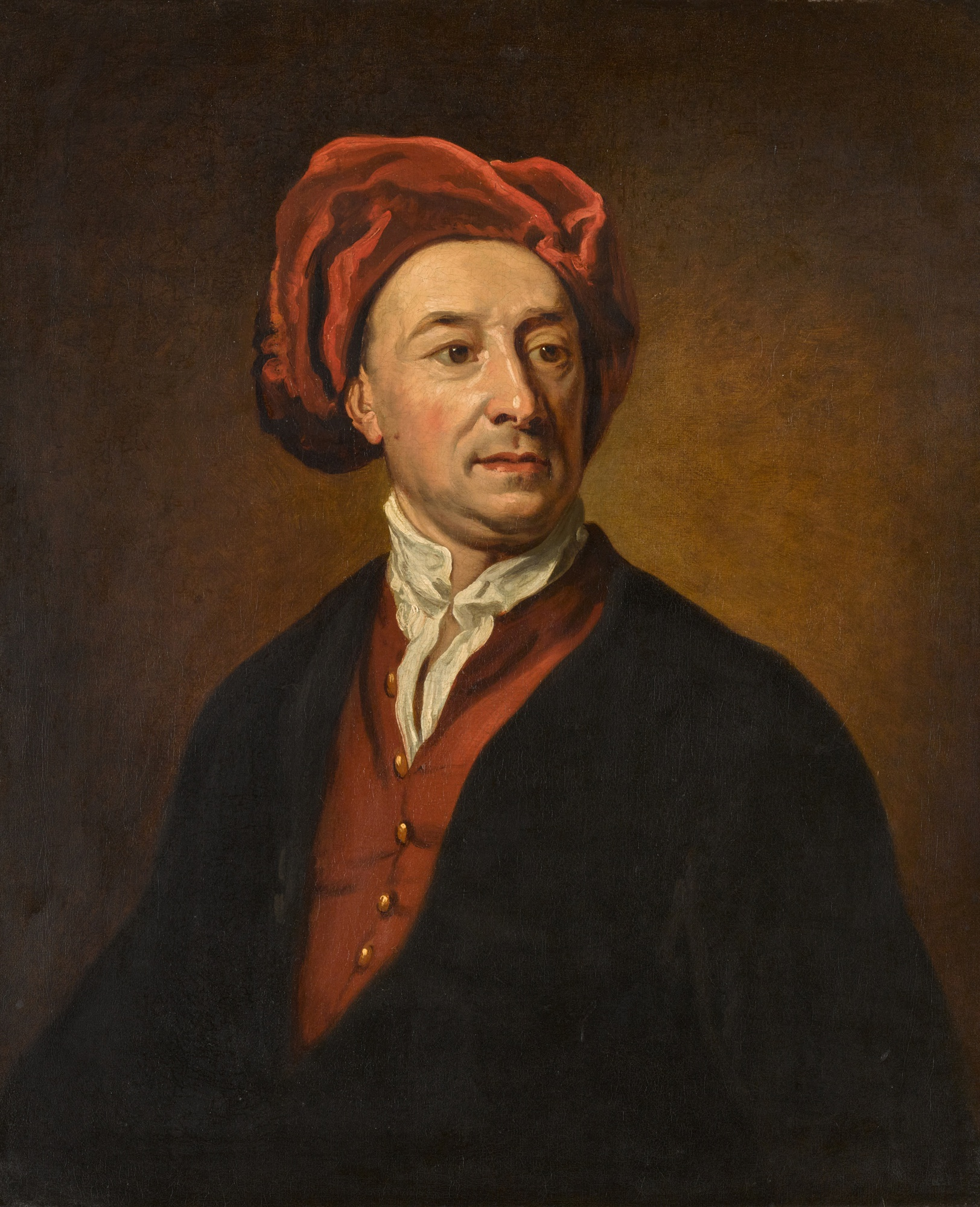
- Studio of Godfrey Kneller, Portrait of Jean-Baptiste Monnoyer
- Born: 12 January 1636; Lille, Spanish Netherlands
- Died: 20 February 1699 (aged 63); London, England

Jean-Baptiste Monnoyer (12 January 1636 – 20 February 1699) was a Franco-Flemish painter who specialised in flower pieces. He was attached to the Gobelins tapestry workshops and the Beauvais tapestry workshops, too, where he produced cartoons of fruit and flowers for the tapestry-weavers, and at Beauvais was one of three painters who collaborated to produce cartoons for the suite The Emperor of China.

== Life ==
He was born at Lille, but was in Paris by 1650, where he was documented working on the decors of the Hôtel Lambert. He was taken up by Charles Le Brun for decorative painting at the Château de Marly and at the Grand Dauphin's residence, the Château de Meudon. He was received at the Académie Royale de Peinture et de Sculpture in 1665 with a piece of the genre that he made his specialty, a still life of flowers and fruit combined with objets d'art. His only appearance at the Paris Salon was in 1673, when four paintings of flowers were exhibited by "M. Baptiste".

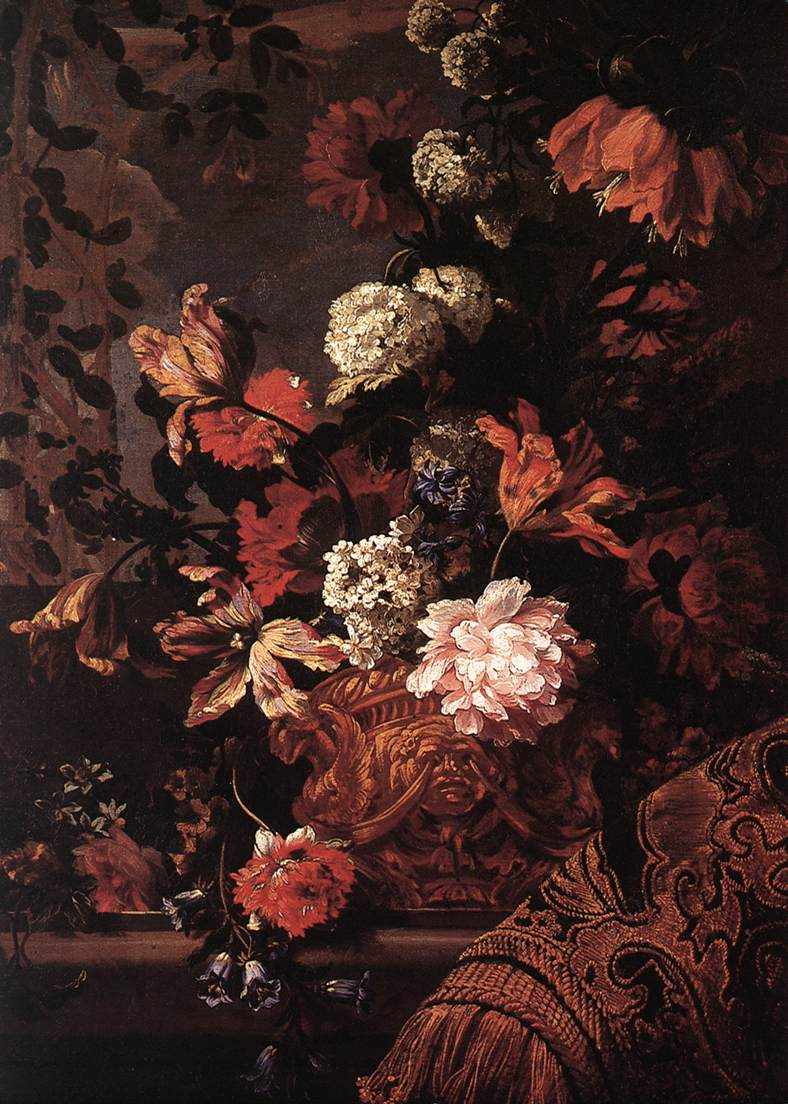
Bouquet de Fleurs (Musée des Beaux-Arts, Marseille)

In 1690, he left France for England, to work on painting decorations for Montagu House, Bloomsbury, London, where he produced over fifty panels of fruit and flowers for overmantels and overdoors, some of which have survived at Boughton House, Northamptonshire. He died in London in 1699.

== Family ==
One of his sons, Antoine Monnoyer (died 1747), called 'Young Baptiste,' was a painter of flowers. Another of his sons, known as 'Frere Baptiste,' who went to Rome and became a Dominican friar, and a painter.

== Works ==
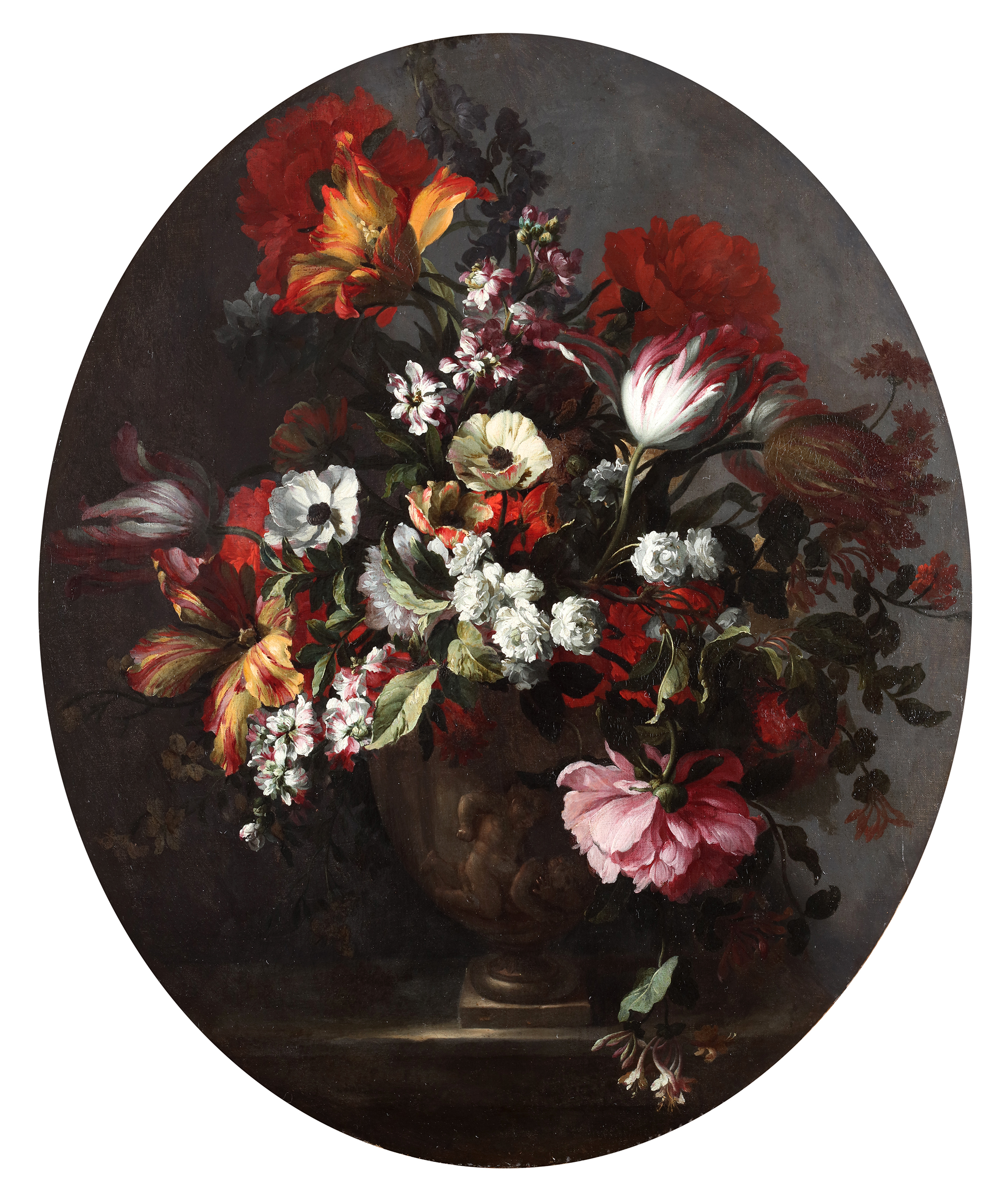
A still life with flowers in a stone vase

His suites of engravings, most notably Le Livre de toutes sortes de fleurs d'après nature show flowers with botanical accuracy and served decorative designers for decades. Monnoyer's engravings of flower pieces were being used by tapestry makers, such as at the Soho tapestry works in London, long after his death. In the twentieth century the poet Wallace Stevens invoked Monnoyer's title Livre de toutes sortes de fleurs d'après nature in his philosophical poem "Esthéthique du Mal", whose centrality to Stevens' work was stressed by Harold Bloom; for Stevens "all sorts of flowers" epitomized the anodyne and sentimental poem, attempting to address and assuage "all sorts of misfortune".
