= Hyacinthe-Marie Cormier =

French Dominican friar and priest

Blessed Hyacinthe-Marie Cormier OP
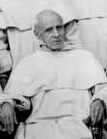
- Born: Louis Stanislas Henri Cormier; 8 December 1832; Orléans, France
- Died: 17 December 1916 (aged 84); Rome, Italy
- Venerated in: Roman Catholic Church
- Beatified: 20 November 1994, Rome, Italy by Pope John Paul II
- Feast: 21 May

Hyacinthe-Marie Cormier (8 December 1832 – 17 December 1916) was a French Dominican friar and religious priest, who served as the 76th Master of the Order of Preachers from 1904 until 1916. Cormier was beatified by Pope John Paul II on 20 November 1994.

== Biography ==
=== Early life and education ===
Cormier was born Louis Stanislas Henri Cormier on 8 December 1832, the Feast of the Immaculate Conception, in Orléans, France, of a well-to-do family of merchants. His father died when he was still young, after which his mother took him and his only brother Eugène to live near their uncle who was a priest. His brother Eugène died shortly afterwards.

Cormier received his initial education at home. Later he studied in the school of the Christian Brothers. In 1846, at the age of thirteen, Cormier entered the minor seminary of the Diocese of Orléans.

As a student he excelled in literature and even more so in music. He was proficient at playing the flageolet, the organ, and the ophicleide, and had a fine singing voice.

Cormier maintained his enthusiasm for music throughout his life, especially sacred music. Franz Liszt heard him play the organ on one occasion and declared him to be a "master of the art".

Advancing to the major seminary of the diocese of Orléans which was conducted by the Society of the Priests of Saint Sulpice, Cormier studied philosophy and theology. He was admitted into the Third Order of Saint Dominic while a seminarian. Cormier graduated at the top of his class. He was ordained in 1856 by Félix Dupanloup, Bishop of Orléans. Cormier was granted a dispensation to be ordained without having reached the canonical age.

=== Life in the Dominican Order ===
Shortly after his ordination for the diocese Cormier felt called to enter the first Dominican Order, which had been officially re-established in France in 1850 after its suppression by the French government. His inspiration for joining the order reportedly was the holy life of the Dominican nun Agnes of Jesus. He went to Flavigny-sur-Ozerain, where Henri Lacordaire had open a novitiate for the Order of Preachers (Dominicans).

Cormier was given the necessary permission to leave the service of the diocese by Bishop Dupanloup and on 29 June 1856 he received the habit of the order and the religious name Hyacinthe-Marie. He began his novitiate at Flavigny Abbey, Côted'Or.

Though Cormier excelled in his studies, he suffered from chronic hemorrhage. His health problems were such that they prevented him from making his religious vows. The fathers of the novitiate decided to send him home. The Master of the order at the time, Alexandre Vincent Jandel, however, happened to visit that house making his canonical visit to the convent of Flavigny. Jandel was greatly impressed by Cormier's character and dedication. He became willing to make the case to the Holy See for a special dispensation for Cormier to be professed. The Master had him accompany him back to Rome as his personal secretary and sent him to the convent of Santa Sabina on the Aventine Hill, where an international novitiate had recently been established.

Upon receiving the petition, Pope Pius IX agreed to let Cormier make his profession upon the condition that he be free from hemorrhage for one full month, but noting, "since it is not for him to live under the religious habit, it will be at least for him to die under it". Cormier then served as personal secretary to Jandrel. He repeatedly failed to meet the papal requirement, going as far as 29 days without an attack, but never a full month. He eventually fell so severely ill that he was expected to die. Given his condition, he was allowed to make a deathbed profession on 23 May 1859 in the chapter room of the Dominican convent of S. Sabina. Soon after this, however, he made a complete recovery. Following his profession, Cormier was appointed sub-Master of novices at Santa Sabina. In 1863 he was elected prior of the convent of Corbara in Corsica.

Two years later he was installed as the first Prior Provincial of Toulouse, a post to which he was re-elected in 1869, and in which he served until 1874. Cormier was then appointed prior of the community in Marseille, where he completed construction of a church and priory. He left this position when he was once more elected Prior Provincial in 1878, an office he held until 1888. He was subsequently elected definitor for the General Chapter at Lyons in 1891.

=== Proposed Cardinalate ===
Sadoc Szabo relates in his work Hyacinth Marie Cormier: 76th Master General of the Order of Preachers that in 1899 Pope Leo XIII began to make Cormier a cardinal but he was prevented because "the French government did not look favorably upon a cardinal chosen from a religious order to seek its interest as a member of the Roman Curia."

=== Master of the Order ===
After the General Chapter, Cormier was called to Rome as socius to the newly elected Master of the Order, Andreas Frühwirth, who later became a cardinal. In Rome, Cormier was appointed Procurator of the Order. On 21 May 1904 he was elected as Master of the Order at the general chapter held at the Convent of S. Maria de la Quercia near Viterbo. He held this post until 1916. As Master, he restored many suppressed provinces and erected new ones, including that of the Most Holy Name of Jesus in the Western United States of America.

Cormier was noted for the quality of his retreats and his powerful preaching. His influence helped to bring about the beatifications of Reginald of Orleans, Bertrand Garrigua, Raymond of Capua and Andrew Abellon.

As Master of the Order, Cormier played a pivotal role in reorganizing the College of St. Thomas in Rome, the future Pontifical University of Saint Thomas Aquinas, commonly referred to as the Angelicum. The General Chapter in 1904 (Viterbo) directed Cormier to develop the College into a studium generalissimum for the entire Order. Building on the legacy of the Order's first Roman studium at the priory of Santa Sabina founded in 1222 and the studium generale that had sprung from it by 1426 at the priory of Santa Maria sopra Minerva and that in 1577 became the College of Saint Thomas, Cormier established the new studium generalissimum as the principal vehicle of dissemination of orthodox Thomistic thought not only among the Dominicans, but also among the secular clergy. The college was elevated in status and renamed Pontificium Collegium Divi Thomae de Urbe in 1906. Cormier gave to the Angelicum his motto as Master General, caritas veritatis, "the charity of truth."

On Holy Thursday, 17 April 1916, just before his retirement Cormier delivered a speech to the Angelicum entitled "Vie intime avec Jesus: allocution prononcee au College Angelique."

The college would go on to be elevated in 1963 to the rank of Pontifical University.

=== Retirement and death ===
After the end of his term in 1916, Cormier retired to the priory at the Basilica of San Clemente in Rome. He died there on the following 17 December at 12.30 pm after a brief illness.

His body was laid in state at the church of San Clemente. He was buried at the Campo Verano cemetery, Rome, in the tomb of the Order of Preachers. On 17 December 1934 his remains were transferred to the Angelicum University Church of Saints Dominic and Sixtus, where his body rests above the high altar in one direction, and above the altar of the University Chapel directly behind it in the opposite direction.

== Beatification ==
During his life Cormier was noted for his saintly qualities: "He gives peace to everything he touches." On numerous occasions he was seen by friars at the Angelicum to levitate in the air while praying before the Blessed Sacrament.

Cormier's spiritual writings were approved by theologians on 16 July 1941 and 17 July 1946. His cause was formally opened on 22 June 1945, granting him the title of a Servant of God. He was beatified by Pope John Paul II on 20 November 1994. His inspiration to Dominican life, Agnes of Jesus, was beatified in the same ceremony with him.

In his sermon for the beatification Mass, the Pope noted that, in beatifying Cormier, "the Church wishes to recognize and honor the work of the human intellect, illuminated by faith."

The feast of the Blessed Hyacinthe-Marie Cormier is celebrated by the Dominican Order as an optional memorial on 21 May, the anniversary of his election as Master of the Order.

Catholic Church titles
Preceded by Andreas Frühwirth	Master General of the Dominican Order; 1904–1916	Succeeded by Ludwig Theissling
