= Bullarium =

Bullarium is a term commonly applied to a collection of papal bulls and other analogous documents, whether the scope of the collection be general in character, or limited to the bulls connected to any particular order, or institution, or locality.

Bullaria were generally intended to render assistance to canonists by bringing within their reach papal enactments which either had been overlooked by the compilers of the "corpus" or which had been issued subsequently to the latest decrees included in it. As such, they frequently excluded papal pronouncements which had already been incorporated into the text of canon law. In general, the collections were not complete, and the selection of canons to include depended on the choice of the editor.

== Origins ==
Various collections of relatively recent papal constitutions were published in the early part of the sixteenth century. A typical specimen of such booklets is supplied by a rare little volume of sixty-two pages printed at Rome per Stephanum Guillereti in regione Parionis 1509, a copy of which is in the British Museum Library. A contribution of more substantial volume appears to have been a volume edited by Mazzutellus in 1579 which contained 723 documents.

== Cherubini bullarium ==
The name bullarium seems to have been invented by the canonist Laertius Cherobini who in 1586 published under the title "Bullarium, sive Collectio diversarum Constitutionum multorum Pontificum". It was a large folio volume of 1404 pages containing 922 papal constitutions from Gregory VII down to Sixtus V, the pope then reigning. This is generally considered to be the first proper bullarium.

Out of Cherubini's 922 documents, more than 800 were from the preceding century. A second edition of his collection, in three volumes, was printed at Rome in 1617. A third edition in four volumes, extending from Leo I to Urban VIII, was prepared by the editor's son, Angelo Cherubini, in 1638, with a supplement added in 1659. Other editions followed, always somewhat enlarged. The fifth in six volumes was brought out by two Franciscans at Rome, 1669–72.

=== Luxembourg edition ===
A fuller but not more accurate reprint with supplementary volumes was published in 1727-1730 at Luxembourg, although the actual place of impression is said to have been Geneva.

Other supplements followed at intervals:

- volume XI (published 1741), covering 1670–1689
- volume XII (published 1741), covering 1689–1721
- volume XIII (published 1741), covering 1721–1730
- volume XIV (published 1741), covering 1730–1740
- volume XV (published 1748), covering 1734–1740
- volume XVI (published 1752), covering 1740–45
- volume XVII (published 1753), covering 1746–1749
- volume XVIII (published 1754), covering 1748–1752
- volume XIX (published 1758), covering 1752–1757

While some content was original to the Luxembourg edition, the later volumes were straightforwardly copied from the Roman edition.

=== Mainardi's Roman edition ===
From 1733 to 1744, Girolamo Mainardi printed a supplement to the latest six-volume Roman edition of Cherubini's bullarium. This eight-volume supplement extended its scope from Clement X (1670–1676) to Benedict XIV (1740).

Simultaneously with this project, Mainardi engaged Charles Cocquelines to re-edit the pre-existing six volumes. The first of these new editions was published in 1739 under the title "Bullarium privilegarium ac diplomatum Romanorum Pontificum amplissima collectio". Cocquelines died before finishing the project, and the following five volumes did not bear his name. In order to keep the numbering consistent with Mainardi's supplement, some of the nominal tomi of the new edition were in fact divided into several parts.

Mainardi had additionally been publishing, in folio, but somewhat smaller, the four volumes of the bullarium of Benedict XIV. In sum, the whole collection which issued from Mainardi's press amounted to thirty-two folio volumes and extended from Leo I in 450 to the death of Benedict XIV, 1758.

As this in time grew antiquated, Andrew Barberi began in 1835 the publication of the Bulls of Pope Clement XIII and his successors "Bullarii Romani Continuato" (19 volumes, fol.), Rome, 1835–57. These came down to the fourth year of Gregory XVI, i.e. to 1834. There is also another series of the same kind which appeared as a continuation of the Bullarium of Benedict XIV at Prato in 1843–67 (10 vols., folio).

=== Turin edition ===
Finally, a large quarto edition of the bullarium was begun at Turin under the auspices of Cardinal Gaudi in 1857, edited by Tomasetti. It claims to be more comprehensive, better printed, and better arranged than the work of Cocquelines, but the additions made are insignificant and the typographical errors are numerous. Moreover, among the documents added, especially in Appendix I (1867), are included some whose authenticity is more than doubtful. At Turin, twenty-two volumes were printed (1857–72) down to Clement XII and five more, continuing the work to the end of Benedict XIV, were added at Naples (1867–85).

== Particular bullaria ==
Rather than attempting to collect all, or all recent, papal bulls, bullaria may collect the papal documents relating to a religious order, institution or locality. Some such examples include:

- "Jus Pontificium de Propaganda Fide", edited by R. de Martinis (Rome, 1888–98), an eight-volume bullarium of the Congregation of Propaganda
- "Italia Pontificia", edited by P. F. Kehr (Berlin 1906), a bullarium of early papal documents on the churches of Italy, funded by the Gottinger Academy

It is common for religious orders to publish bullaria compiling documents related to the particular order. Some of the more extensive are:

- the Bullarium of the Dominicans, edited by Ripoll and Brémond (eight vols., Rome, 1729–40)
- the Bullarium of the Franciscans, edited by Sbaralea (4 vols., Rome, 1758–80) with a supplement by Eubel (3 vols., Rome, 1897–1904)
- the Bullarium of the Capuchins (7 vols., Rome, 1740–52)
- the Bullarium of the Benedictines of Monte Cassino (2 vols., Venice, 1650)

Compendia have also been published of the "Bullarium Romanum" as printed in the eighteenth century, such as the "Pontificarium Constitutionem in Bullario Magno contentarum Epitome", edited by Guerra (4 vols., Venice, 1772)

Commentaries on the bullarium or on large portions of it have been published by the Jesuit J. B. Scortia (Lyons, 1625), by the Dominican, M. de Gregorio (Naples, 1648), and by Cardinal Vincent Petra (Rome, 1705–26).

Finally, "Fontes Juris Canonici", edited by Andreas Galante (Innsbruck, 1906), compiles a number of papal bulls important to canon law.

== Regesta ==
Historically speaking, the most interesting papal volumes are often those contained in the "Regesta" which have never been included in the general Bullarium. Since the archives of the Vatican were thrown open to students by Leo XIII in 1883, immense labor has been spent upon the copying and publication of the Bulls contained in the "Regesta"; but even before this date, facilities for research were not infrequently accorded. Many hundreds of copies of documents relating to Great Britain were made for the British Government by Marino de Marinis in the early part of the nineteenth century and are now preserved in the British Museum.

In 1873 the Reverend Joseph Stevenson was sent to Rome for a similar purpose and transcripts made by him during four years' residence may be consulted at the Record Office, London. Since then, Messrs Bliss and Tenlow have been engaged in the same task and have published at the expense of the British Government seven volumes of a "Calendar of Entries in the Papal Register illustrating the History of Great Britain and Ireland." These are primarily papal letters, and they extend from the beginning of the thirteenth to the middle of the fifteenth century. The members of the Ecole Française de Rome have been equally active, with the publication of the "regesta" of various pontificates, mostly of the thirteenth century. Those of

- Honorius IV (1285–87),
- Nicolaus IV (1288–92),
- Benedict XI (1304–04)

have been published and are complete. Those of

- Innocent IV (1243–54),
- Urban IV (1261–64),
- Clement VI (1265–68)

are all but complete; while great progress has been made with those of

- Gregory X and John XXI (1271–77),
- Nicolaus III (1271–80),
- Martin IV (1281–85),
- Boniface VIII (1291–03),
- Gregory IX (1227–41), and
- Alexander IV (1254–61).

Besides these, the "Regesta" of Clement V (1305–1314) have been published by the Benedictines in nine volumes folio at the cost of Leo XIII, and those of John XXII (1316–34), as far as they relate to France, are being printed by A. Coulon, while those of the other Avignon popes are also in hand. The Regesta of Innocent III and his successor Honorius III have long been printed, and they are among the last volumes printed in the Patrology of Migne. Other local bullaria include the considerable collections published some time ago by Augustin Theiner for various countries under the general heading of "Vetera Monumenta."

Distinguishing genuine from spurious papal letters in the early centuries AD is a difficult task. The collection of Pierre Coustant, Epistolae Romanorum Pontificorum (Paris, 1721), is of the highest value, but the compiler only lived to carry his work down to the year 440, and A. Thiele, who continued it, brought it no further than 553. Some further help has been provided by Hampe, regarding the papal letters to Charlemagne and to Louis the Pious, and by Herth-Gerenth for Sergius II. For practical purposes the chief court of appeal for an opinion on all papal documents is the Regesta Pontificorum Romanorum of Philipp Jaffé, much improved in its second edition by its editors, Wilhelm Wattenbach, Paul Ewald, Ferdinand Kaltenbrunner, and Samuel Löwenfeld. In this a brief synopsis of given of all existing papal documents known to be in existence, from the time of Peter to that of Innocent III (1198), with indications of the collections in which they have been printed and with an appendix dealing with spurious documents. This has been continued by August Potthast to the year 1304 (2 vols., Berlin).
