= Usodimare =

Usodimare is a surname. Notable people with the surname include:

- Antoniotto Usodimare (1416–1462), Genoese trader
- Stefano Usodimare (died 1557), Master of the Order of Preachers
