= Francesco Romeo =

Francesco Romeo (died 1552) was the Master of the Order of Preachers from 1546 to 1552.

== Biography ==
A native of Castiglione, Romeo was a friend of Jean du Feynier, who had Romeo accompany him on visitations. On one of these visits, he became a friend of St. Catherine of Ricci.

The Dominican Order elected Romeo as their master at a chapter held in 1546. As master, he visited Spain and the Kingdom of France. He attended most of the first and second sessions of the Council of Trent.

He died in Rome in 1552.

Catholic Church titles
Preceded by Alberto de las Casas	Master of the Order of Preachers; 1546–1552	Succeeded by Stefano Usodimare
