= Sisto Fabri =

Italian theologian and canon lawyer

- Born: August 4, 1540; Villa Basilica, Lucca, Italy
- Died: 1594 (aged 53–54); Italy
- Occupations: Theologian, canon lawyer
- Theological work
- Language: Italian
- Tradition or movement: Dominican Order

Sisto Fabri (4 August 1540 – 1594) was a theologian and canon lawyer of the Dominican Order who was appointed Master of the Sacred Palace by Pope Gregory XIII serving from 1580 to 1583, and Master of the Order of Preachers from 1583 to 1589.

== Early biography ==
Fabri was born 4 August 1540 at Villa Basilica, near Lucca, Italy. Shortly after his birth his family moved to Naples.

== Formation ==
Fabri entered the Dominican Order in 1556 at the convent of Santa Caterina a Formiello. After completing his studies there Fabri began teaching there in 1563. Fabri was later sent to Bologna to study canon law.

== Career ==
In the mid-1550s Fabri served as professor of theology at the Dominican studium at Santa Maria sopra Minerva, the forerunner of the Pontifical University of Saint Thomas Aquinas, Angelicum.

In 1571 he became the secretary of the Master of the Order of Preachers Serafino Cavalli whom he accompanied during his visitations to many provinces. Later Cavalli appointed Fabri as Provincial for the Holy Land and Procurator for the Order.

In 1576 while prior of the convent at Santa Maria sopra Minerva Fabri taught theology at the University of Rome. During this time he came to know Giordano Bruno who was a guest at the convent. During his priorship in 1577 the studium at the Minerva was reorganized in light of the generous donation of Juan Solano, O.P., former bishop of Cusco, Peru and became the College of St. Thomas, the forerunner of the Pontifical University of Saint Thomas Aquinas, Angelicum.

In 1580 Fabri was appointed Master of the Sacred Palace by Pope Gregory XIII. Fabri was asked in 1581 to examine the texts of Michel de Montaigne who was travelling through Rome at the time. After Fabri examined Montaigne's Essais the text was returned to its author on 20 March 1581. Montaigne had apologized for references to the pagan notion of "fortuna" as well as for writing favorably of Julian the Apostate and of heretical poets, and was released to follow his own conscience in making emendations to the text.

In 1582 Fabri collaborated on the new edition of the Corpus iuris canonici for Pope Gregory.

At the Dominican chapter of 1583, he was elected Master of the Order of Preachers. As master, he issued a Ratio Studiorum ordering negligent teachers to be imprisoned. During his mastership, the Uniate Friars of Armenia were raised to a Dominican province and allowed to wear their habit. As master, he was responsible for testing the stigmata of St. Catherine of Ricci.

In 1584 Fabri received what was probably an honorary doctorate from the University of Ferrara.

In May 1589 Fabri was removed from office as Master of the Order of Preachers by Pope Sixtus V and a successor was elected at the Chapter of 21 May. The official reason was Fabri's support for Maria da Visitação (María Lobo de Meneses), a Portuguese Dominican nun who confessed to faking the stigmata in 1588.

Fabri then retired to Florence under the protection of Ferdinando I de' Medici, Grand Duke of Tuscany. He returned to Rome only after the death of Pope Sixtus V (1590) and lived the remaining years of his life at the convent of Santa Sabina where he was buried in 1594.

Catholic Church titles
Preceded by Paolo Constabile	Master of the Order of Preachers; 1583–1589	Succeeded by Ippolito Maria Beccaria
