= Agnes of Jesus =

French Catholic nun (1602–1634)

Blessed Agnes of Jesus OP
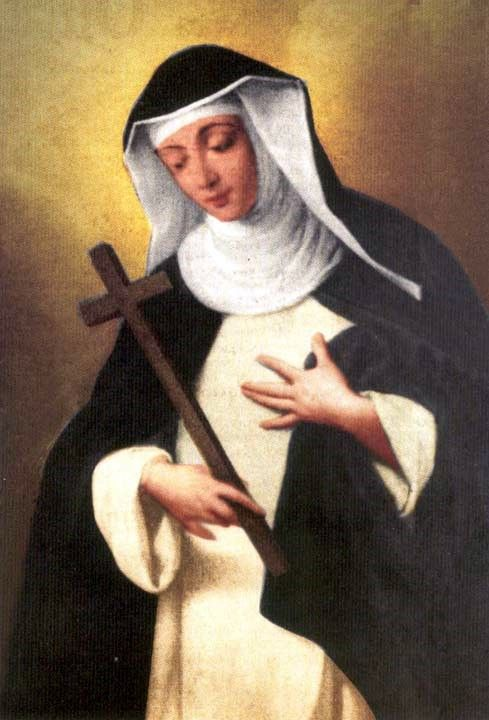
- Agnes of Jesus, depicted in the habit of a Dominican nun

Virgin
- Born: 17 November 1602; Le Puy-en-Velay, France
- Died: 19 October 1634 (aged 31); Langeac, France
- Venerated in: Roman Catholic Church
- Beatified: 20 November 1994, Rome by Pope John Paul II
- Feast: 19 October

Agnes of Jesus, OP (born Agnès Galand and also known as Agnes of Langeac; 17 November 1602 – 19 October 1634) was a French Catholic nun of the Dominican Order. She was prioress of her monastery at Langeac, and is venerated in the Catholic Church, having been beatified by Pope John Paul II on 20 November 1994.

== Life ==
Agnès Galand was born on 17 November 1602 in Le Puy-en-Velay, the third of seven children of Pierre Galand, a cutler by trade, and his wife, Guillemette Massiote. When she was five years old, Galand was entrusted to a religious institute for her education. Even from that early age, she showed a strong sense of spiritual maturity. She consecrated herself to the Virgin Mary at the age of seven.

Galand joined the Dominican Monastery of St. Catherine of Siena at Langeac in 1623. At her receiving of the religious habit she took the name Agnes of Jesus. Soon after her own profession, she was assigned to serve as the Mistress of novices for the community. Galand was elected to lead her community as prioress in 1627. She was later deposed from this office, but she accepted her demotion with indifference and grace.

She died on 19 October 1634 in Langeac.

== Spiritual legacy ==
=== Notable visions ===
Galand was noted even during her lifetime as a mystic. Louis Marie de Montfort records the following anecdote:

I shall simply relate an incident which I read in the life of Mother Agnes of Jesus, a Dominican nun of the convent of Langeac in Auvergne. ... One day the Blessed Virgin appeared to Mother Agnes and put a gold chain around her neck to show her how happy she was that Mother Agnes had become the slave of both her and her Son. And St. Cecilia, who accompanied our Lady, said to her, "Happy are the faithful slaves of the Queen of Heaven, for they will enjoy true freedom."

In 1631, Galand experienced the most famous of her visions, in which the Blessed Virgin Mary urged her to pray for an unknown priest with the command, "Pray to my Son for the Abbé of Prébrac (near Cugnaux)." Jean-Jacques Olier was the current holder of that office, and while at a retreat led by Vincent de Paul, he experienced a vision in which Galand appeared to him, though he was unacquainted with her. He sought out the nun who had appeared to him in the dream. When he met Galand, she told him: "I have received orders from the Holy Virgin to pray for you. God has destined you to open the first seminaries in France." Olier would go on to found the Society of Saint-Sulpice. Before her death, she related to her community her great desire that they pray for priests.

=== Veneration and beatification ===
A cause for her beatification was introduced on 19 March 1713. She was declared venerable on 19 March 1808 by Pope Pius VII. Pope John Paul II beatified her on 20 November 1994. At her beatification ceremony, John Paul II called Galand "truly blessed", noting her willingness to submit to God's plan for her, "offering her intellect, will, and freedom to the Son of Man, that he might transform them and harmonize them totally with his own!" Her feast day is 19 October.

Hyacinthe-Marie Cormier, beatified on the same day as Galand, cited the example of Galand's life as his inspiration for joining the Dominican Order. He would go on to be elected the seventy-sixth Master General of the Dominicans in 1904.
