= Leandro Alberti =

Italian historian

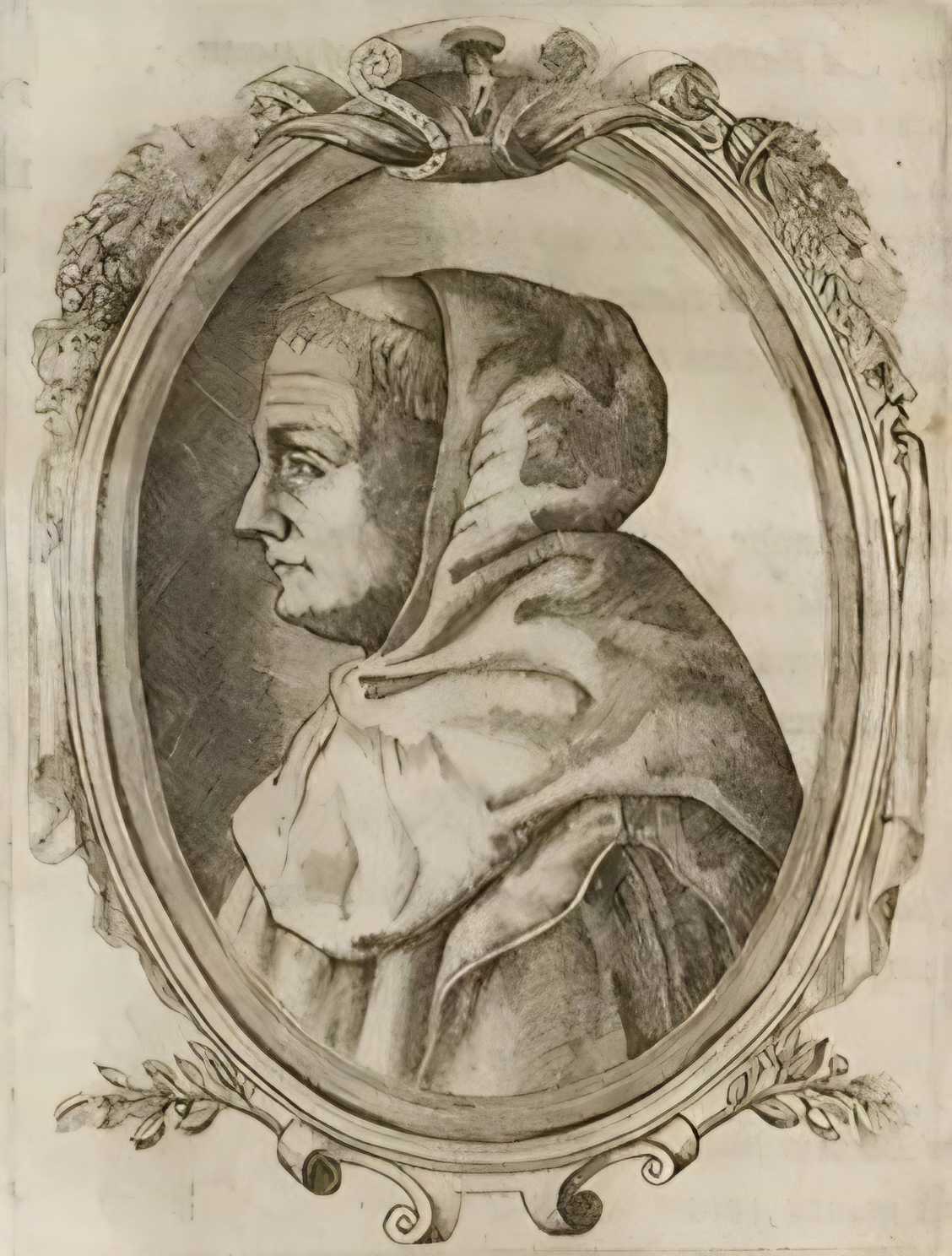
- Born: 12 December 1479; Bologna, Papal States
- Died: 9 April 1552 (aged 72); Bologna, Papal States
- Occupations: Dominican friar, historian, and humanist

Leandro Alberti (12 December 1479 – 9 April 1552) was an Italian Dominican friar, historian, and Renaissance humanist.

== Life ==
Alberti was born and died at Bologna. In his early youth he attracted the attention of the Bolognese rhetorician, Giovanni Garzoni, who volunteered to act as his tutor. He entered the Dominican Order in 1493, and after the completion of his philosophical and theological studies was called to Rome by his friend, the Master General, Francesco Silvestri of Ferrara, called "Ferrariensis". He served him as secretary and socius until the death of Silvestri in 1528.

== Works ==
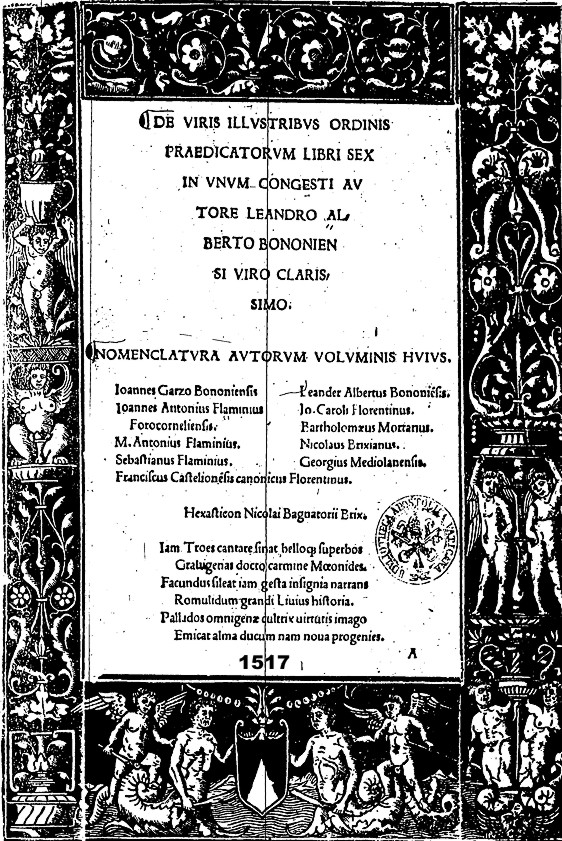
De viris illustribus (1517).

In 1517, Alberti published in six books a treatise on the famous men of his order (De viris illustribus Ordinis Praedicatorum, Bologna 1517), that is still worth consulting. This work has gone through numerous editions and been translated into many modern languages. Besides several lives of the saints, some of which Papebroch form part of the Acta Sanctorum, a history of the Madonna di San Luca and the adjoining monastery, he published (Bologna, 1514, 1543) a chronicle of his native city (Istoria di Bologna, etc.) to 1273. It was continued by Lucio Caccianemici to 1279.

The fame of Alberti rests chiefly on his Descrizione d'Italia (Bologna, 1550) a book comprising valuable topographical and archaeological observations. Many of the heraldic and historical facts are of little value, however, since Alberti followed closely the uncritical work written by Annius of Viterbo on the same subject. The work was translated into Latin in 1566, after the Italian version was considerably expanded. He also wrote a chronicle of events from 1499 to 1552, and sketches of famous Venetians.

His explanations of the prophecies of Joachim of Fiore and his treatise on the beginnings of the Venetian Republic reflect the historical criticism of his day. He was a close friend of most of the contemporary literati, who frequently consulted him. He is often mentioned in the letters of the poet Giovanni Antonio Flaminio, who dedicated the tenth book of his poems to the friar.

== Bibliography ==
- Herbermann, Charles, ed. (1913). "Leandro Alberti" . Catholic Encyclopedia. New York: Robert Appleton Company.
- Redigonda, A. L. (1967). "Alberti, Leandro". New Catholic Encyclopedia. Vol. 1. New York: McGraw-Hill.
- Jeffrey A. White (2019). "Chorography as Culture: Biondo Flavio and Leandro Alberti" (PDF). Commentaria Classica. 6: 61–84.
- Redigonda, Abele L. (1960). "ALBERTI, Leandro". Dizionario Biografico degli Italiani (in Italian). Vol. 1: Aaron–Albertucci. Rome: Istituto dell'Enciclopedia Italiana. OCLC 883370.
