= Gioacchino Torriani =

Italian Dominican friar, inquisitor and Master of the Order of Preachers

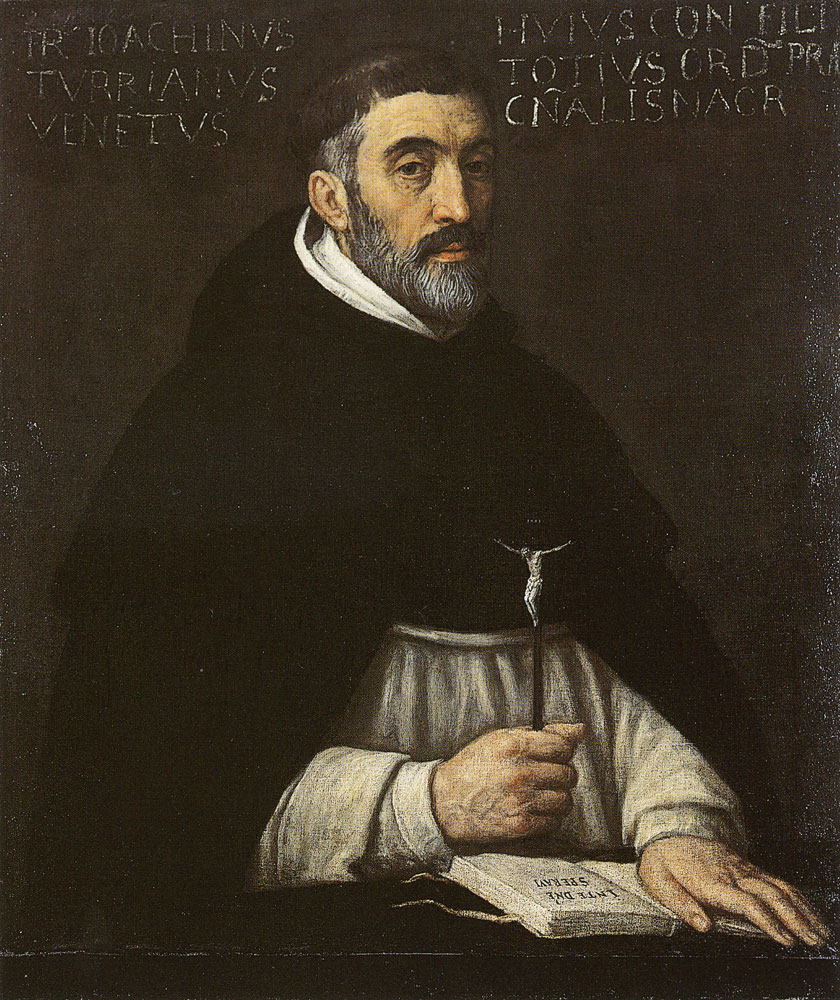
Portrait of Torriani by Leandro Bassano

Gioacchino di Giacomo Torriani (also rendered Joachim Torriani; c. 1417 – 1 August 1500) was an Italian Dominican theologian, inquisitor and the 36th Master of the Order of Preachers (1487 – 1500).

== Biography ==
Torriani was born in or near Venice around 1417. He entered the Dominican Order in his youth and studied philosophy under the Venetian logician Paolo della Pergola. From 1450 to 1453 he pursued theology at the Dominican convent of Santi Giovanni e Paolo in Venice, after which he taught for three years in the studium generale at the convent of Saint Augustine in Padua. By 1456 he was on the theology faculty of the University of Padua and, on 22 February 1459, received the degree of Master of Theology.

Beginning in 1461 Torriani lectured on metaphysics at Padua and served as regent of the studium generale there. He was twice prior of Santi Giovanni e Paolo (1465 – 1469 and 1475 – 1476) and, between those terms, inquisitor of Vicenza (1474 – 1477). His inquisitorial mandate ended when Pope Sixtus IV transferred the office in Vicenza from the Dominicans to the Observant Franciscans on 14 October 1477.

Elected provincial of the Dominican Province of Lower Lombardy (officially the province of Saint Dominic) for 1479 – 1482, Torriani was chosen Master of the entire order at the general chapter held in Venice in 1487, a post he retained until his death. As Master he sat on the papal tribunal that condemned the Florentine reformer Girolamo Savonarola in 1498.

Torriani died in Rome on 1 August 1500 and was buried there.

== External links and additional sources ==
- Chow, Gabriel. "Masters of the Order of Preachers". GCatholic.org. ^{[self-published]}

op
Preceded by Barnaba Sansoni	Master of the Order of Preachers; 1487 – 1500	Succeeded by Vincenzo Bandello
