= Baltasar de Quiñones =

Master of the Order of Preachers from 1777 to 1798

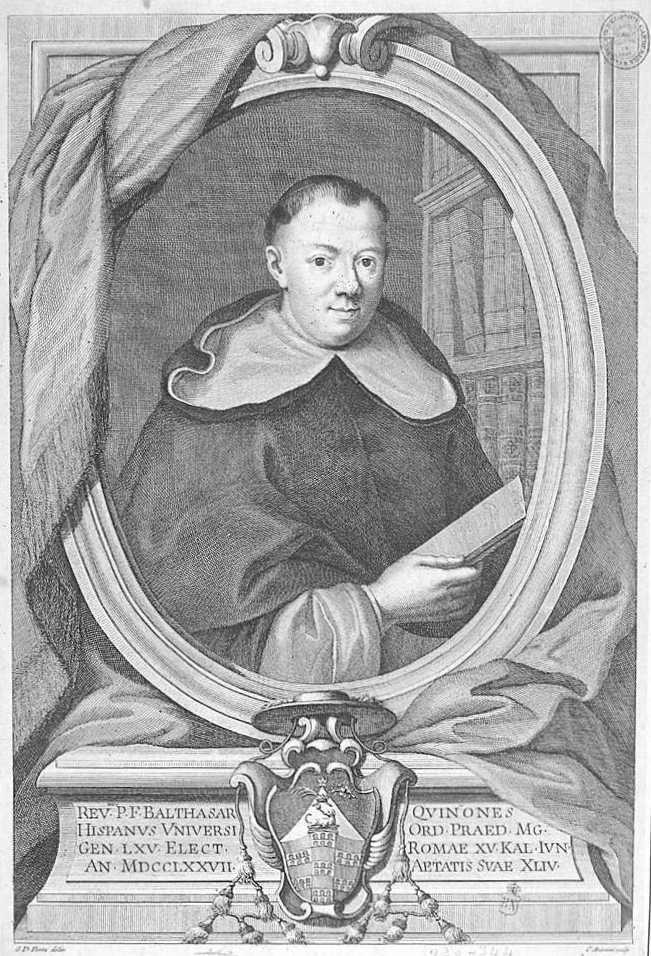
Baltasar de Quiñones

Baltasar de Quiñones (died 1798) was the Master of the Order of Preachers from 1777 to 1798.

== Biography ==
Baltasar de Quiñones was a native of Noblejas in the Province of Toledo, located in the ecclesiastical province of Spain. He first came to prominence as a preacher at the court of Charles III of Spain.

In 1777, the General Chapter of the Dominican Order elected him as their master. He was master at the time of the French Revolution, with its concomitant anti-clericalism and the Dechristianisation of France during the French Revolution. All religious houses in France, Belgium, Germany, and many in Italy were suppressed from roughly 1789 to 1850. Quiñones remained strangely indifferent to the disasters befalling his order. As such, he was deposed by Pope Pius VI in 1798 and exiled to La Quercia.

He later returned to Spain, and then moved on to Florence, where he died on 20 June 1798.

Catholic Church titles
Preceded by Juan Tomás de Boxadors	Master of the Order of Preachers; 1777–1798	Succeeded by Pio Giuseppe Gaddi
