= Leonardo Mansueti =

Leonardo Mansueti was an Italian Dominican and librarian.

He was nominated Master of the Sacred Palace by Pope Paul II in 1465. Mansueti held this important post, which entailed being the Pope's personal preacher and theologian, from 1465 to 1474.

He was Master General of the Dominican Order (1474–1480); his major legacy was commencing registers of the Order of Preachers in more or less continuous series, especially of appointments and inquisitions. Gioralomo Borselli praised Mansueti as being learned, moral, and regular, but criticized him as being too tame in his interactions as Master with Pope Sixtus IV, possibly in the vain hope of being promoted to Cardinal.

== Bibliography ==
- Thomas Kaeppeli, O.P., Inventari di libri di San Domenico di Perugia (1430-80), Roma, Edizioni di Storia e Letteratura, 1962.
- Giulio Battelli, Fra Leonardo Mansueti Perugino e l'antica biblioteca di S. Domenico a Perugia, in The memory be Green, Perugia, Salvi, 1986, pp. 33-53.

Preceded by Marcial Auribelli	Master General of the Dominican Order; 1474 – 1480	Succeeded by Salvo Cassetta
