= Giovanni Giacinto Sbaraglia =

Italian historian

Giovanni or Gian Giacinto Sbaraglia (13 March 1687 – 2 January 1764), otherwise Joannes Hyacinthus Sbaralea, was a historian of the Franciscan Order.

His works include Supplementum et castigatio ad scriptores trium ordinum S. Francisi and Bullarium Franciscanum (in four volumes, Rome, 1759–1768).

== Works ==
- Bullarium Franciscanum Romanorum Pontificum constitutiones, epistolas, ac diplomata continens tribus ordinibus Minorum, Clarissarum, et Poenitentium a seraphico patriarcha Sancto Francisco institutis concessa ab illorum exordio ad nostra usque tempora iussu atque auspiciis reverendissimi patris magistri fr. Joannis Baptistae Constantii, 7 vols., Typis Sacrae Congregationis de Propaganda Fide, Romae 1759-1804.
- Supplementum et castigatio ad scriptores trium ordinum S. Francisci a Waddingo aliisve descriptos; cum adnotationibus ad Syllabum matyrum eorundem ordinum, 3 vols., Ex typographia S. Michaelis ad ripam apud Linum Contedini, Romae 1806.
- Germana s. Cypriani, et Aphrorum, nec non Firmiliani, et orientalium opinio de haereticorum baptismate, Ex Typographia Laelii a Vulpe, Bononiae 1741.
- Series ministrorum provincialium qui perantiquam Bononiae Provinciam Ordinis Minorum Conventualium inde ab initio administrarunt ex antiquis monumentis concinnata, Typis polyglottis vaticanis, Romae 1925.
