= Jean Clérée =

Jean Clérée (1450–1507) was the Master of the Order of Preachers in 1507.

Catholic Church titles
Preceded by Vincenzo Bandello	Master of the Order of Preachers; 1507	Succeeded by Thomas Cajetan
