= Vincenzo Giustiniani (Dominican) =

Italian-Greek Dominican friar (1516–1582)

Cardinal of S. Nicola fra le Immagini Vincenzo Giustiniani
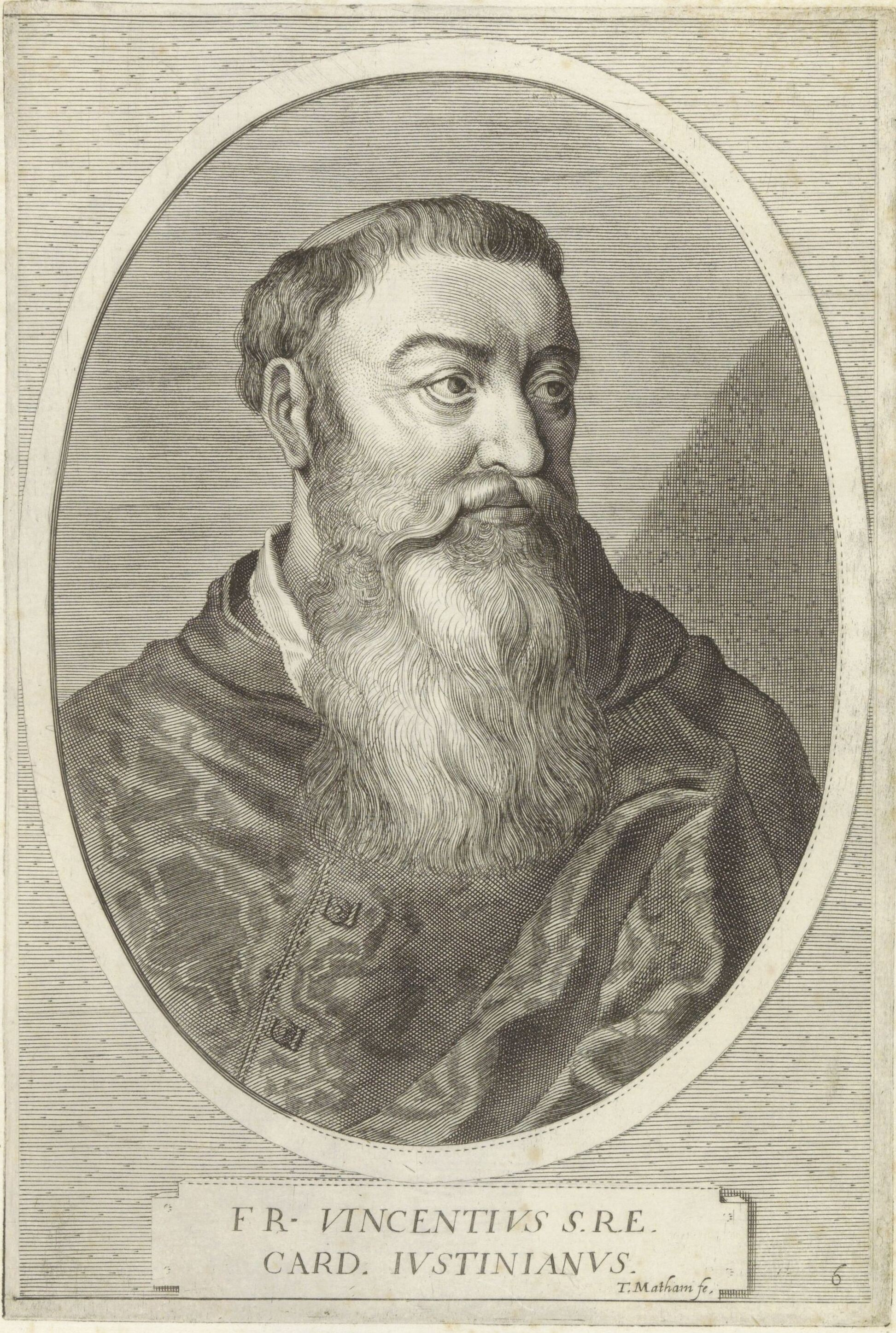
- Born: August 1516; Chios
- Died: 28 October 1582 (aged 66); Rome
- Education: Order of Preachers
- Title: Friar; Master General of the order of Preachers; Cardinal; Hymnwriter
- Theological work
- Era: Renaissance
- Tradition or movement: Dominican Order

Vincenzo Giustiniani (August 1516, Chios – 28 October 1582 Rome) was an Italian-Greek friar of the Dominican order of Genoese heritage.

He was Master General of the order from 1558 to 1570. He was elevated to Cardinal of S. Nicola fra le Immagini in the consistory of 17 May 1570.

Catholic Church titles
Preceded by Stefano Usodimare	Master General of the Dominican Order; 1558–1570	Succeeded by Serafino Cavalli
