= Paolo Butigella =

Italiam Dominican

Paolo Butigella OP (1475 – October 9, 1531) was the Master of the Order of Preachers from 1530 to 1531.

== Biography ==
Paolo Butigella was a native of Padua. He joined the Dominican Order in 1494 at the monastery of Santa Maria degli Angeli in Ferrara. He served as vicar general of the Congregation of Lombardy 1516-18 and again 1522–24. From 1520 to 1522, he was prior at the monastery of San Domenico in Bologna. He participated in the order's general chapters in Mantua in 1516 and in Forlì in 1522. On December 31, 1525, Pope Clement VII named him inquisitor of Ferrara and Modena and on February 23, 1529 made him vicar general of the Order of Preachers. The general chapter held in Rome in 1530 elected him Master of the Order of Preachers. He served only a year, dying in Naples on October 9, 1531.

Catholic Church titles
Preceded by Francesco Silvestri	Master of the Order of Preachers; 1530–1531	Succeeded by Jean du Feynier
