= Agostino Pipia =

Master of the Order of Preachers

Agostino Pipia O.P.
- Cardinal-Priest of Santa Maria sopra Minerva
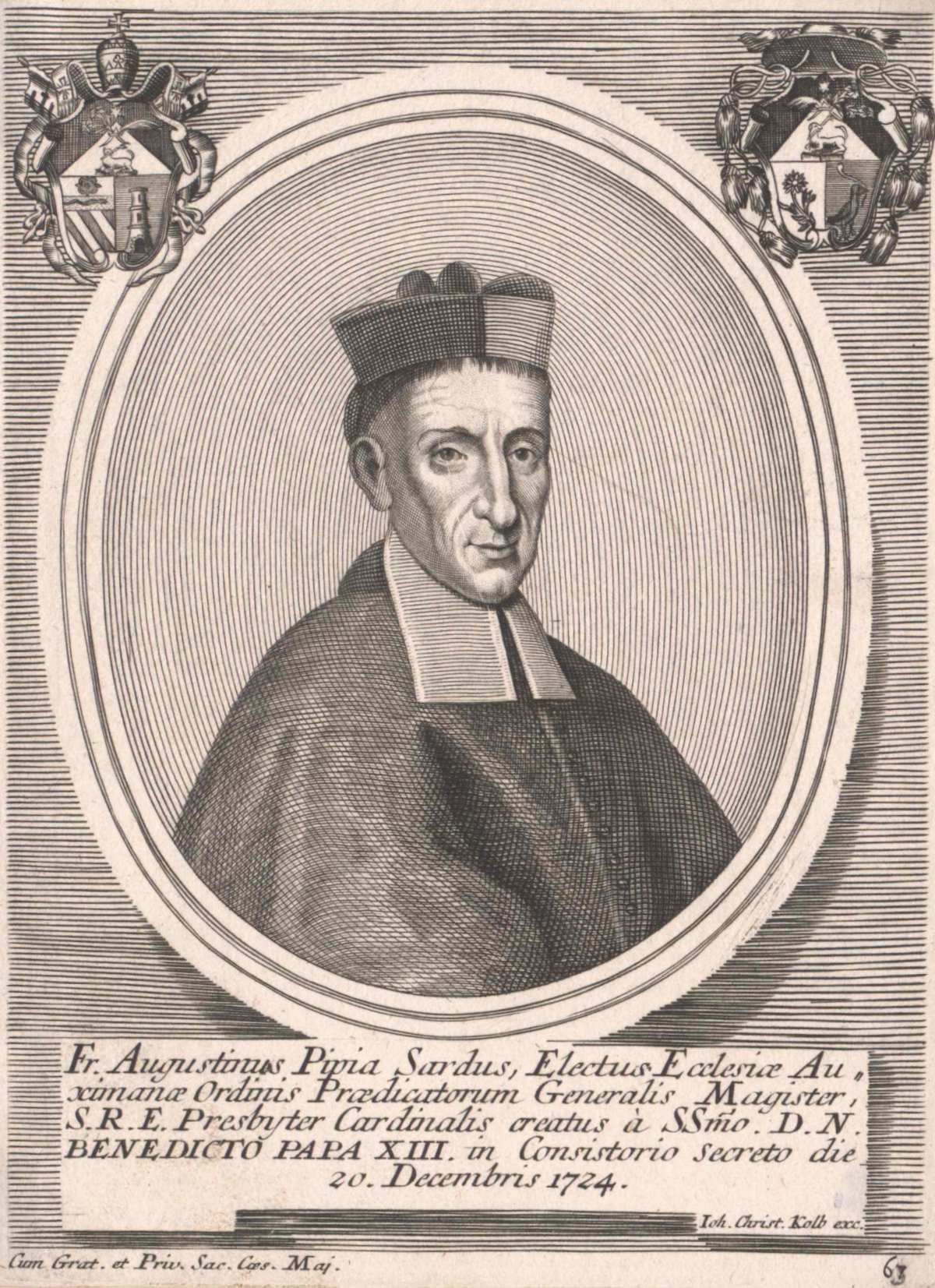
- Church: Catholic Church
- See: Santa Maria sopra Minerva
- In office: 3 March 1729 – 1730
- Predecessor: Louis Antoine de Noailles
- Successor: Philipp Ludwig von Sinzendorf
- Previous posts: Cardinal-Priest of San Sisto (1725-1729); Bishop of Osimo e Cingoli (1725-1727); Bishop of Osimo (1724-1725); Master of the Order of Preachers (1721-1725)

Orders
- Consecration: 31 December 1724 by Pope Benedict XIII
- Created cardinal: 20 December 1724 by Pope Benedict XIII

Agostino Pipia (1660–1730) was the Master of the Order of Preachers from 1721 to 1725.

== Biography ==
A native of Sardinia and a member of the Dominican Order, Agostino Pipia was the Master of the Sacred Palace. In 1721, a Dominican General Chapter elected him to be Master of the Order of Preachers. In 1724, the Dominican Cardinal Orsini became Pope Benedict XIII. The pope often worshiped in Dominican churches and raised the privileges of the order. The pope made Pipia a cardinal in 1724. Pipia died the next year.

Catholic Church titles
Preceded by Antonin Cloche	Master of the Order of Preachers; 1721–1725	Succeeded by Tomás Ripoll
