= Giovanni Garzoni =

Giovanni Garzoni (1419–1506) was an Italian humanist and physician from Bologna, where he was professor of medicine and teacher of rhetoric.

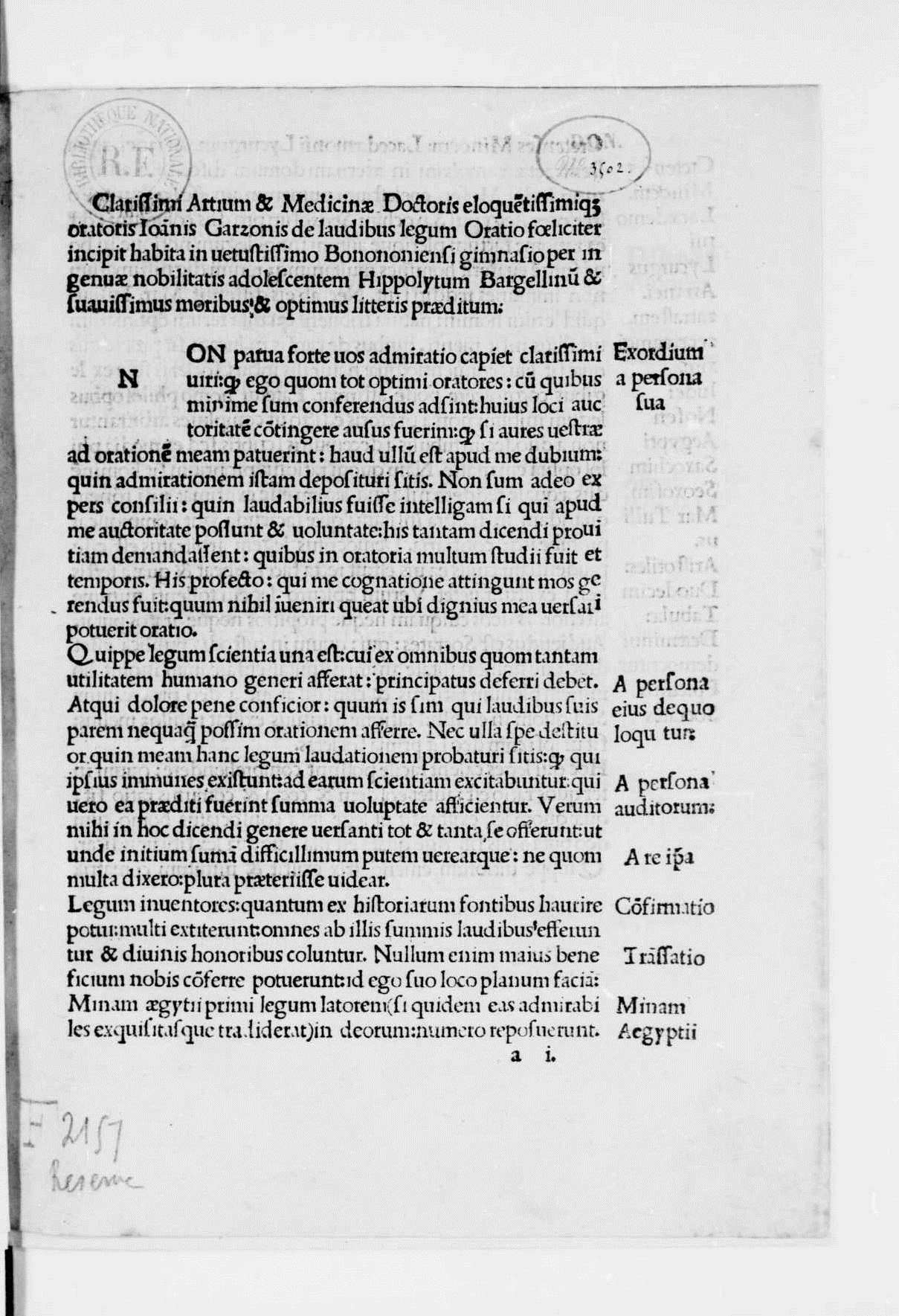
Oratio de laudibus legum, 1499

== Biography ==
Born in Bologna in 1419 as the son of Bernardo Garzoni, a physician and rhetoric. Already in his youth, Garzoni's main interest was rhetorics, when he may have been instructed by his father Bernardo Garzoni and by Giovanni Lamola, and met humanists like Leonardo Bruni. When his father became one of the physicians of pope Nicholas V (between 1447 and 1455), Giovanni went along with him to Rome. The earliest extant texts by Barzoni date from this period, including a 300 folio long codex, mainly consisting of the emended Tractatus by Petrus Hispanus; and some poems and other minor works. Here as well, he met other humanists like Theodorus Gaza.

He was a student of Guarino da Verona, with whom he studied Juvenal, and of Lorenzo Valla, who was his teacher for four years. In 1455, he worked for cardinal Domenico Capranica, for whom he travelled to Naples. Part of this work was done together with Jacopo Piccolomini-Ammannati, a fellow humanist and later cardinal. In or after 1458, he returned to Bologna, where he became a public speaker, providing orations for official events, something he would later on also do at the university. He also started working as a private teacher of rhetoric, having students from countries and regions like Hungary, Croatia and Bohemia. His most famous pupils were the historian Leandro Alberti, who stayed with Garzoni from when he was ten until he was fourteen, and Girolamo Savonarola, who was a student of Garzoni in 1476 and 1477, when he was a novice in Bologna.

Later, he became friends with humanists like Antonio Urceo and Julius Pomponius Laetus.

He received his degree in medicine in 1466, and remained a professor of medicine at the University of Bologna for the rest of his life.

== Works ==
Garzoni wrote 36 lives of saints (or vitae), including those of Agatha, Blasius, Catherina Alex., Cecilia, Christina, Cosmas and Damian, Eustachius, Felix and Felix, George, Gervasius and Protasius, Hippolytus, the apostle Johannes, Laurentius, Lucia, Margarita, some Mauritanian martyrs, Nereus and Achilleus, Primus and Felicianus, Proculus, Sebastian, Vitus and Hippolytus, Simon of Trent, the martyr Peter, Petronius, Theodorus, Symphorianus, and Christopher.

Some of his letters have been collected in ten books of epistolae familiares.

Other works that survive include histories (mainly Bolognese history), dialogues, treatises, medical texts, and a large number of funerary and other orations, on a wide range of subjects, from religion to military matters, including a pornographic story, Heliogalbalus. Many of these are unpublished manuscripts, some published works include:

- Oratio de laudibus legum (in Latin). Bologna: Caligola Bazalieri. 1499.
- De eloquutione libellus, 1503
- Ad clarissimum virum dominum Ioannem Blanchfeldum berliniensem prohemium in vitam divi Antonii abbatis, 1503
- De Rebus Saxoniae, Thuringiae, Libonotriae, Misnae, Et Lusatiae: 1518
- Chronica. Des Durchleuchtigen, Hochgebornen Fürsten vnd Herrn, Herrn Friderichen, Landgraffen in Düringen, Marggraffen zu Meychssen[et]c.: 1546 (reprinted 1584)
- Historiae Bononienses, reprinted in 2012 by Bononia University Press

The De miseria humana by Jean Gerson is sometimes mistakenly attributed to Garzoni.
