= Jean de Moulins =

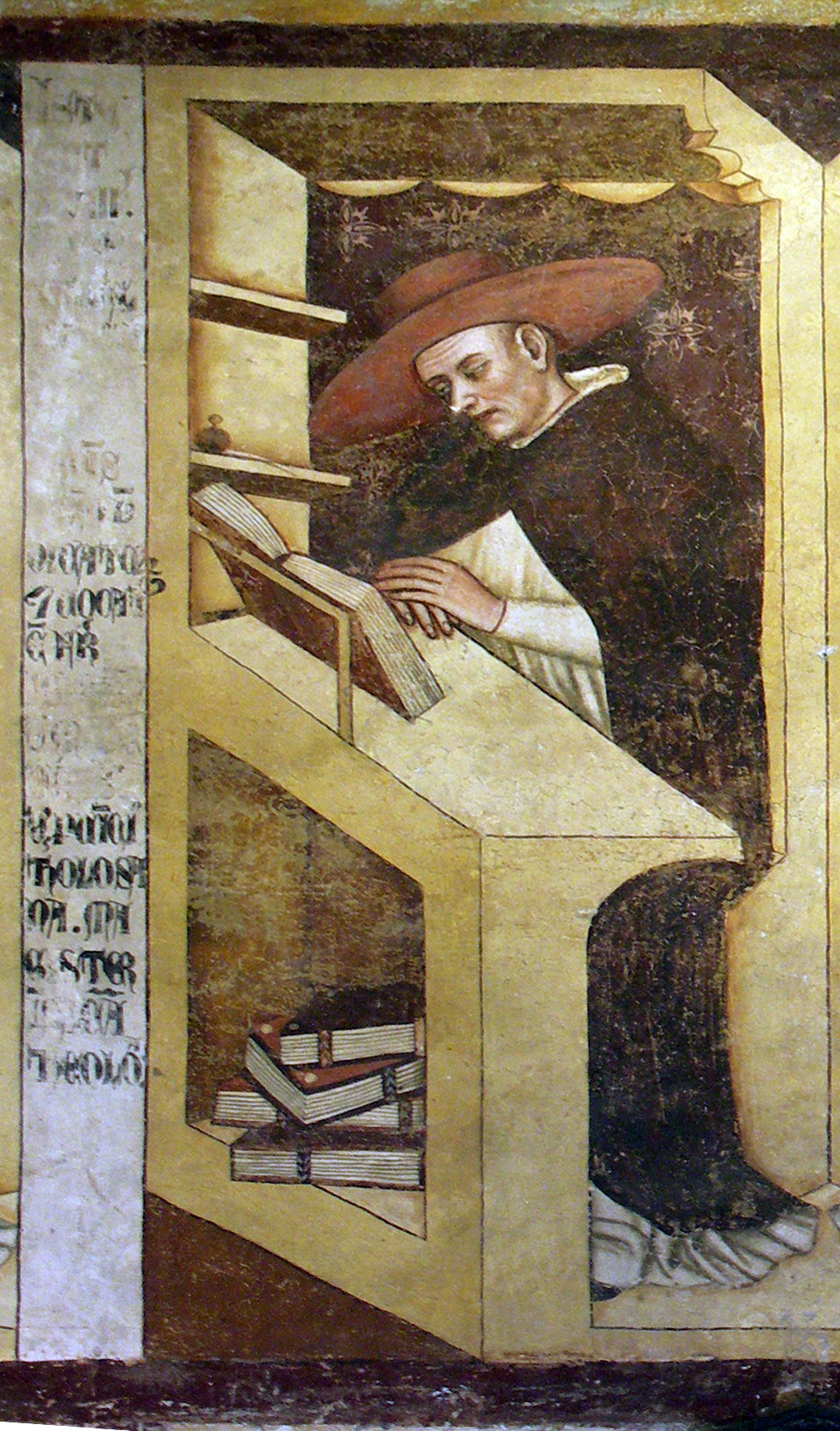
Cardinal Jean de Moulins painted by Tommaso da Modena

Jean de Moulins was a French Dominican and prelate, who was incardinated in the Toulouse province. In 1344 was appointed Inquisitor of the kingdom of France and from 1345 to 1349 Master of the Sacred Palace. He was elected Master General of the Dominican Order in 1349.

One year later he was appointed as Cardinal of Santa Sabina in the Consistory of 17 December 1350. He resigned from the order. He died on 23 February 1353.

Preceded by Garin de Gy	Master General of the Dominican Order; 1349–1350	Succeeded by Simon de Langres
