= Alberto de las Casas =

Alberto de las Casas (died 1544) was the Master of the Order of Preachers from 1542 to 1544.

== Biography ==
At a chapter held in 1542, Casas was the candidate of Charles V, Holy Roman Emperor to be Master of the Order of Preachers; the Dominican Order elected Casas as their Master.

Catholic Church titles
Preceded by Agostino Recuperati	Master of the Order of Preachers; 1542–1544	Succeeded by Francesco Romeo
