= Agostino Recuperati =

Agostino Recuperati (died 1540) was the Master of the Order of Preachers from 1539 to 1540.

== Biography ==
The Dominicans elected Recuperati Master of the Order of Preachers at a chapter held in 1539. As master, he attempted to reform the Province of Portugal by sending in Spanish regulars but was largely unsuccessful. He attempted to reform the Dominican convent at Genoa, but his methods earned him the rebuke of Pope Paul III. His mastership saw the final suppression of the order in the Kingdom of England (where the order had been isolated by Henry VIII since 1523); six of 54 convents defected to Protestantism while the rest fled to exile on the continent.

He died in 1540. St. Catherine of Ricci later reportedly saw him in hell in a vision.

Catholic Church titles
Preceded by Jean du Feynier	Master of the Order of Preachers; 1539–1540	Succeeded by Alberto de las Casas
