= Konrad Eubel =

German historian

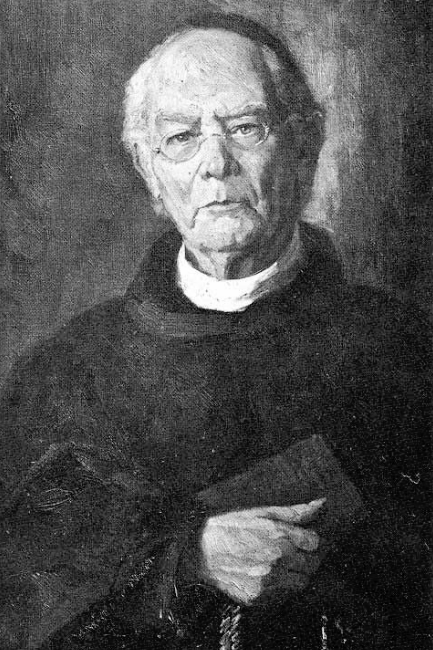
A portrait of Konrad Eubel

Konrad Eubel or Conradus Eubel (19 January 1842 – 5 February 1923) was a German Franciscan historian. He is known for his reference work, the Hierarchia Catholica Medii Aevi, on medieval popes, cardinals and bishops. It appeared in three volumes, beginning in 1898. It covers the period 1198 to 1592, and is a more detailed version of the Series episcoporum Ecclesiae Catholicae by Pius Bonifacius Gams.

Under the title of the Hierarchia Catholica Medii et Recentioris Aevi the work has continued and now stands at nine volumes covering the period from 1198 to 1922.

Other works include a Franciscan bullarium.
