= Hugh of Vaucemain =

French Dominican (died 1341)

Hugh of Vaucemain (died 1341) was a French Dominican, who became head of his order in 1333. He was a Burgundian.

His time as Master-General was marked by a conflict with Pope Benedict XII. Benedict, a Cistercian, was attempting a reform of the monastic orders. Hugh's position as the head of a mendicant order was apparently not against the reform as such, but derived from the feeling that the mendicants' position would then be threatened.

The Order numbered around 12,000 at this time, according to a census of 1337. This was a decade before the Black Death, which caused a general fall in population.

Preceded by Barnaba Cagnoli	Master General of the Dominican Order; 1333–1341	Succeeded by Gerard de Daumar
