= Tommaso Turco =

Tommaso Turco (died 1649) was the Master of the Order of Preachers from 1644 to 1649.

== Biography ==
He was born in Cremona and taught metaphysics at the University of Padua. Tommaso Turco was elected master at the 1644 Chapter of the Dominican Order, over the opposition of Pope Urban VIII, whose preferred candidate was Michel Mazarin, brother of Cardinal Mazarin.

As master, Turco conducted extensive visitations of Italy, Spain, the Kingdom of France, and the Spanish Netherlands.

He died in 1649.

Catholic Church titles
Preceded by Niccolò Ridolfi	Master of the Order of Preachers; 1644–1649	Succeeded by Giovanni Battista de Marinis
