= Ippolito Maria Beccaria =

Ippolito Maria Beccaria (1550 – 3 August 1600) was the Master of the Order of Preachers from 1589 to 1600.

== Biography ==
Ippolito Maria Beccaria was born in Mondovì in 1550, the son of Enrichetto Beccaria and his wife Caterina Donzelli.

He joined the Dominican Order in 1564 at Santa Maria delle Grazie in Milan. He then studied at the University of Bologna, then became a professor of theology. He later became Master of the Sacred Palace. He was then prior of Santa Sabina. At a provincial chapter held in Mantua in 1584, he was elected master of the province of Lombardy, as the preferred candidate of Pope Sixtus V and Cardinal Bonelli. He served as the inquisitor of Milan in 1588.

On 21 May 1589 a general chapter of the Dominican Order elected Beccaria as Master of the Order of Preachers. He began a visitation of the Kingdom of Naples on 22 June 1589. On 28 April 1591 he began a visitation to the monasteries of northern Italy. On 3 April 1592 he returned to Rome to pay homage to Pope Clement VIII. He spent 5 May to 1 July 1592 at a chapter held in Santi Giovanni e Paolo, Venice. On 22 March 1593 he began a visitation of the Dominican monasteries in Austria, Bohemia, and Poland. He traveled to Genoa in January 1596. He then went to Spain, where he visited their convents until 1598. He returned to Rome in October 1598.

In 1598, a dispute developed between the Dominicans and the Jesuits about the thought of Luis de Molina. On 1 January 1599 Pope Clement VIII called Beccaria and the Superior General of the Society of Jesus, Claudio Acquaviva, before him to discuss the issue of Molinism; the meeting was held before the pope on 22 February 1599.

On 21 December 1599 he was given the task of deciding what to do with Giordano Bruno.

He held a chapter of the Dominican Order that met in Naples beginning on Pentecost 1600. Beccaria died in Naples on 3 August 1600.

Catholic Church titles
Preceded by Sisto Fabri	Master of the Order of Preachers; 1589–1600	Succeeded by Jerónimo Xavierre
