= Francesco Silvestri (theologian) =

Italian Dominican theologian (1474–1528)

The Very Reverend Francesco Silvestri OP
- Born: Francesco Silvestri da Ferrara; 1474; Ferrara, Duchy of Ferrara
- Died: 19 August 1528 (aged 53–54); Rennes, Kingdom of France

Education
- Education: University of Bologna

Philosophical work
- Era: Medieval philosophy
- Region: Western philosophy; Italian philosophy
- School: Thomism
- Institutions: University of Ferrara
- Main interests: Metaphysics; Theology; Analogy
- Notable works: Commentary on Thomas of Aquinas's Summa contra gentiles
- Master of the Order of Preachers
- Church: Catholic Church
- Elected: June 1525
- In office: 1525–1528

Orders
- Ordination: 1488

Francesco Silvestri da Ferrara OP (1474 – 19 September 1528) was an Italian Dominican theologian. (Note: Other names include Francis Sylvester of Ferrara (Latin: Franciscus Sylvester Ferrariensis) and Franciscus Sylvester de Sylvestris.) He wrote a notable commentary on Thomas of Aquinas's Summa contra gentiles, and served as Master General of his order from 1525 until his death.

== Life ==
Francesco Silvestri was born at Ferrara in 1474. At the age of fourteen he joined the Dominican Order. In 1516 he was made a master in theology. He was prior first in his native city and then at Bologna, and in the provincial chapter held at Milan in 1519 he was chosen vicar-general of the Lombard congregation of his order.

Having discharged this office for the allotted term of two years, he became regent of the college at Bologna where he remained for a considerable time. He was also inquisitor of Bologna from 1519 until 1525. Later he was appointed by Pope Clement VII vicar-general of his entire order, and on 3 June 1525, in the General Chapter held at Rome, he was elected Master General.

As general of his order he visited nearly all the convents of Italy, France, and Belgium, making efforts there to restore discipline. He was planning to begin a visitation of the Spanish convents when he died of an illness on 19 September 1528 at Rennes in Brittany. Leandro Alberti, his traveling companion, remarked that Silvestri was a man of "remarkable mental endowments," and that "nature seemed to have enriched him with all her gifts."

== Works ==
Silvestri wrote many works on philosophy, most notably on Thomas Aquinas and Aristotle.

- Commentaria in libros quatuor Contra gentiles sancti Thomae de Aquino (ca. 1516): a monumental commentary on Thomas's Summa contra gentiles, and the one for which Silvestri is principally remembered.
- Annotationes in libros Posteriorum Aristotelis et sancti Thomae: a commentary on Aristotle's Posterior Analytics.
- Quaestiones in libros Physicorum: an explication of the eight books of Aristotle's Physics.
- Quaestiones luculentissimae in octo libros physicorum Aristotelis
- Quaestionum libri De anima quam subtilissime simul et preclarissime decisiones: an explication of the three books of Aristotle's De anima.
- Apologia de convenientia institutorum Romanae Ecclesiae cum evangelica libertate (Rome, 1525): defended the primacy and the organization of the Catholic Church against Martin Luther; some have erroneously attributed this work to Silvester Prierias.
- Beatae Osannae Mantuanae de tertio habitu ordinis fratrum praedicatorum vita: an account of the life of the Dominican teriary mystic Osanna of Mantua.

Catholic Church titles
Preceded by García de Loaysa	Master General of the Dominican Order; 1525–1528	Succeeded by Paolo Butigella
