= Elias Raymond =

Elias Raymond was a French Dominican friar from Toulouse and Master General of the Dominican Order.

He was named Procurator of the Order under Master Simon de Langres. On 21 February 1365 Raymond was named Vicar of the Order by Pope Urban V. He led the order from 1367 to his death in 1389.

Raymond worked to bring the relics of Thomas Aquinas to Toulouse; this eventually happened during the time of his successor Raimondo delle Vigne.

At the time of the Western Schism, he adhered to the party of the antipope Clement VII. Raymond died in Avignon on 31 December 1389.

Preceded by Simon de Langres	Master General of the Dominican Order; 1367 – 1380	Succeeded by Raimondo delle Vigne
