= Jerónimo Xavierre =

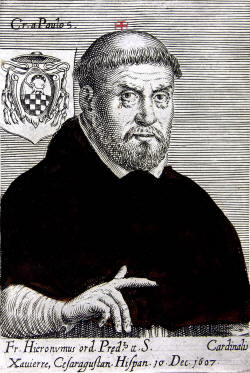
Jerónimo Xavierre, 1607

Jerónimo Xavierre (Zaragoza, 1546 – Valladolid, 8 September 1608) was a Spanish Dominican theologian.

== Biography ==
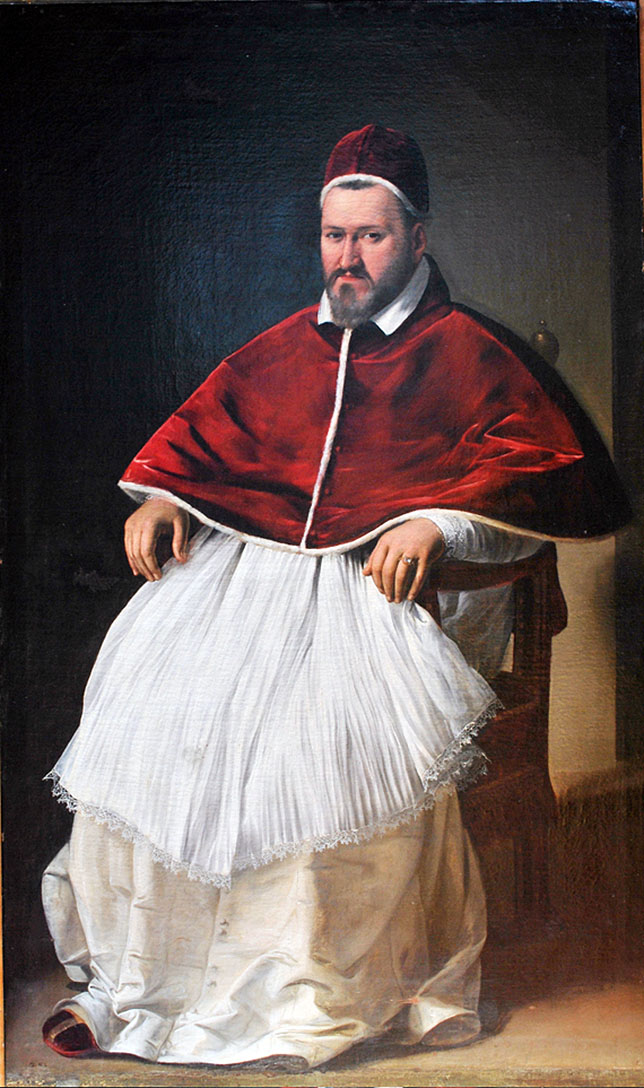
Pope Paul V

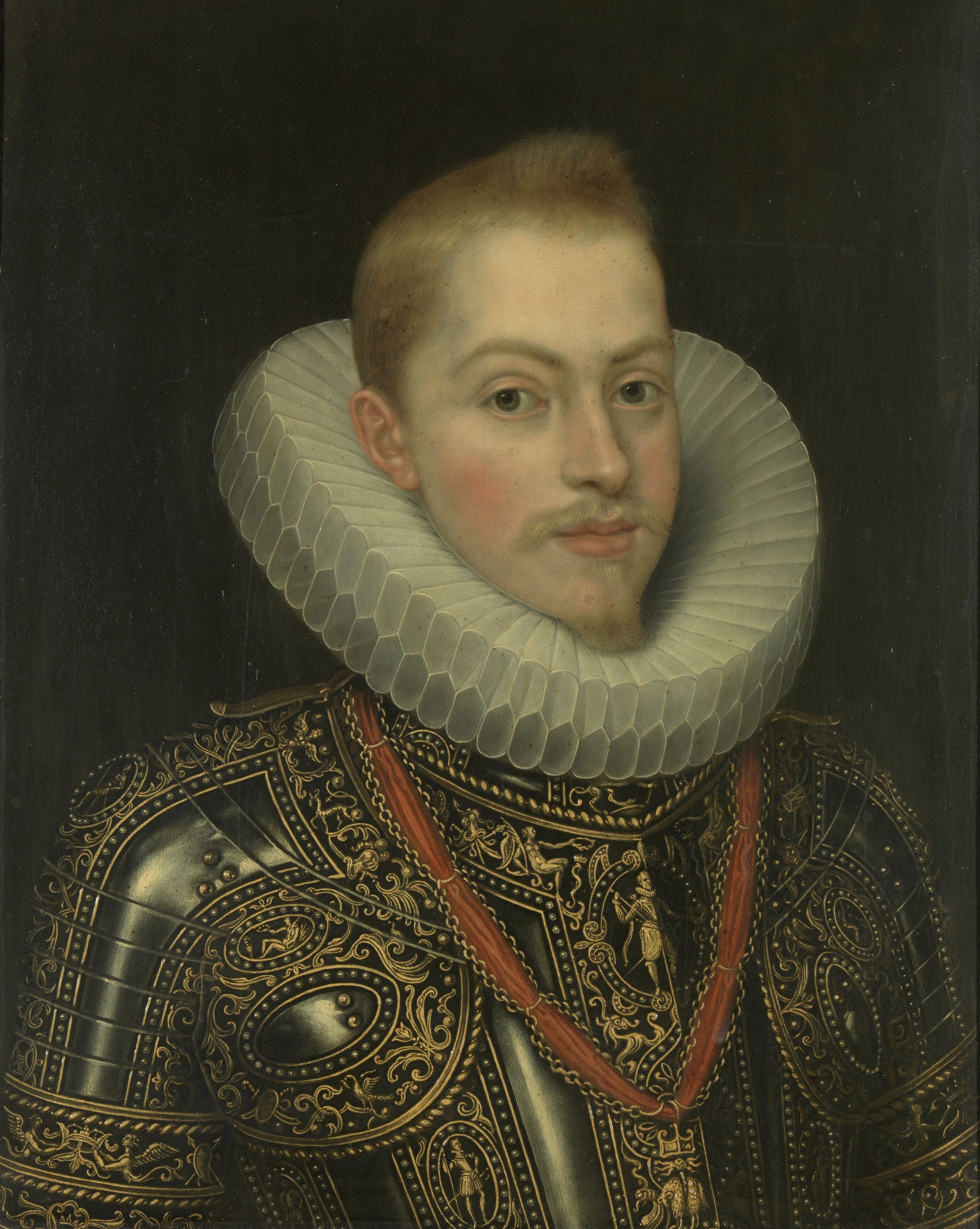
King Philip III

He was born the third son of the seven children of the family of Zavierre-Perez de Caseda. At the age of 16, he felt called to take the habit of the Dominicans in 1562. After spending ten years in the School and General Study of Tortosa, as a student and then as a professor, he returned to his land towards the end of 1575.

In 1578, he was sworn in the position of consultant to the Holy Office in his city. In 1579, he received the title of Presented in Sacred Theology. From 1581, he was University Professor of Theology and worked untiringly for the definitive institutionalization of the University of Zaragoza. During the following years, he alternated his university work with the charge of prior of the preachers of Zaragoza. He also collaborated directly in the foundation of the School of St. Vincent Ferrer.

In 1600, he was elected provincial prior of Aragon, but the following year he was elected master general of his order. He worked as a trainer and reformer in the religious life, did theological work on the question of de auxiliis, promoted the Order in the West Indies, and propulsor of the liturgy and the history of the Order. In 1605, after the General Chapter was held in Valladolid, Jerónimo was appointed confessor by King Philip III.

Jerónimo won the favor of King Philip III to such an extent that the monarch requested Pope Paul V to promote Jerónimo to the status of a cardinal. On 10 December 1607 he received the cardinal's hat, but he died of a pestilential fever in Valladolid on September 8, 1608, before receiving the red biretta and the title. His tomb is located in the Church of San Ildefonso in Zaragoza.

Catholic Church titles
Preceded by Ippolito Maria Beccaria	Master of the Order of Preachers; 1601–1607	Succeeded by Agostino Galamini
