= Simon de Langres =

Simon de Langres was a French Dominican friar from Burgundy and Master General of the Dominican Order from 1352 to 1366.

From 1350 to 1352 he was the Provincial of France.

He was deposed from his generalship in 1360, by a vote of eight to six; he officially resigned in 1366.

In 1360 he was made the Nuncio (Papal envoy) to France. He was made Nuncio to Hungary in 1363. On 16 March 1366, de Langres was appointed Bishop of Nantes and resigned his position of Master of the Dominican Order.

In 1379 he gave allegiance to Clement VII, the antipope of Avignon.

In 1382 he was transferred to the diocese of Vannes, but one year later resigned. On 7 June 1384 he died in the convent of Nantes.

During his tenure were established the Studia Generalia solicited by Emperor Charles IV and was celebrated the famous Chapter of Prague, in 1359, during which the emperor filled the friars of the most delicate attentions.

== Sources ==
- Daniel Antonin Mortier, Histoire des maîtres généraux de l'Ordre des frères prêcheurs, Picara 1907, Vol. 3

Preceded by Jean de Moulins	Master General of the Dominican Order; 1352–1366	Succeeded by Elias Raymond
