= Vincenzo Bandello =

Vincenzo Bandello or Bandelli (died 1507) was the Master of the Order of Preachers from 1501 to 1507.

== Biography ==
Vincenzo Bandello came from Lombardy and joined the observant branch of the Dominican Order. He became the prior of Santa Maria delle Grazie in Milan. It was rumored that he was the model for Judas Iscariot in The Last Supper by Leonardo da Vinci.

A General Chapter of the Dominican Order elected him master in 1501. As master, he founded the observant Congregations of Ragusa in 1501 and Ireland in 1505. His overall policy was to attempt to incorporate the observants into the general administration of the various provinces; for example, the Spanish observants were merged into the Province of Spain in 1505. He discouraged the cult of Girolamo Savonarola (a former pupil), though he did not suppress the Congregation of San Marco founded by Savonarola. In 1506, he issued a new version of the Dominican Constitutions.

He died in Sicily in 1507.

Catholic Church titles
Preceded by Gioacchino Torriani	Master of the Order of Preachers; 1501–1507	Succeeded by Jean Clérée
