= Conrad of Asti =

- Born: Nearest of Asti in Piedmont
- Died: 1470

Conrad of Asti (died 1470) was an Italian religious man who was born nearest of Asti in Piedmont. He became Dominican friar and for his virtue and science was elected Master General of his order in 1462, as a candidate of the Pope, after the resignation of his predecessor Marcial Auribelli. He was a theologian of Piedmont, entered the Dominican order, of which he became general in 1462, in place of Martial Auribelli, whom Pope Pius II deposed. Paul II having in his turn deposed Conrad, Auribelli was restored to his position. His works were, Commentaria injus Canonicum: — Summa Casuum Conscientiae: — Opus Praeclarum et Laboriosum quo Dicta B. Thomae de Aquino per aiteriias Ordinavit: — Epistola Encyclica in Universus Ordinem, etc. See Hoefer, Nouv. Biog. Generale, s.v.; Jocher, Allgemeines Gelehrten-Lexikon, s.v. In 1465, Conrad renounced to the charge and retired in Asti where he lived entirely dedicated to prayer and study for the rest of his life. He was succeeded by the same Auribelli.

Preceded by Marcial Auribelli	Master General of the Dominican Order; 1462–1465	Succeeded by Marcial Auribelli
