= Juan Tomás de Boxadors =

Spanish cardinal (1703-1780)

His Eminence Juan Tomás de Boxadors OP
- Master of the Order of Preachers
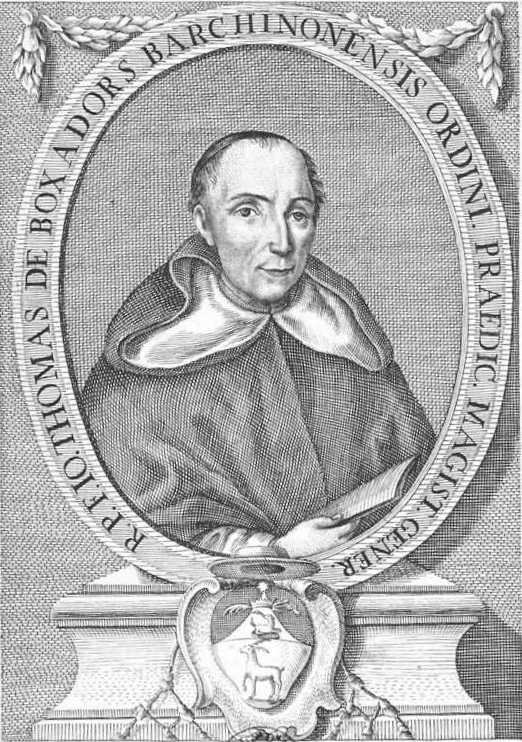
- Church: Roman Catholic Church
- In office: 1756–1777
- Other post: Cardinal-Priest of San Sisto (1775–1780)

Orders
- Created cardinal: 13 November 1775 by Pope Pius VI
- Rank: Cardinal-Priest

Personal details
- Born: 3 April 1703 Barcelona, Spain
- Died: 16 December 1780 (aged 77) Rome, Papal States

Juan Tomás de Boxadors (1703–1780) was a Spanish cardinal from 1775 to 1780. He previously served as the Master of the Order of Preachers from 1756 to 1777.

== Biography ==
Juan Tomás de Boxadors began his career as a diplomat of the Kingdom of Spain to the court of Charles VI, Holy Roman Emperor. Following the death of his brother in the 1755 Lisbon earthquake, Boxadors had a spiritual crisis that resulted in his joining the Dominican Order. He taught Christian theology for a number of years, and then became a companion of Master Brémond.

At a General Chapter of 1756, the Dominican Order elected him as their master. That chapter charged him with promoting the use of the rosary, and Boxadors did so faithfully. He completed a visitation of the order's Spanish provinces.

He promoted the revival of Thomism with his letter "De renovanda et defendenda doctrina sancti Thomae" (1757) which was widely distributed in the Order. Lamenting deviations from Thomistic doctrine and demanding a return to the teachings of Thomas Aquinas, Boxadors charged Salvatore Roselli (1722–1784) with assisting the reform of education in the order. Roselli then wrote his influential Summa philosophica ad mentem Angelici Doctoris S. Thomae Aquinatis of 1777, which supplanted the major manuals of the day and continued to be the standard Thomistic text through its third edition in 1857–59.

In the wake of the Enlightenment, the Dominican Order was able to recruit fewer and fewer young men and women. By 1758, there were only three novices in all of the Kingdom of France. In 1765, King Louis XV appointed a commission to reform the religious houses of France. Boxadors futilely resisted these reforms.

Pope Pius VI made him a cardinal in 1775.

He died in Rome on 16 December 1780.

Catholic Church titles
Preceded by Antonin Brémond	Master of the Order of Preachers; 1756–1777	Succeeded by Baltasar de Quiñones
