= Giovanni Battista de Marini =

Giovanni Battista de Marini (died 1669) was the Master of the Order of Preachers from 1650 to 1669.

== Early Biography ==
Giovanni Battista de Marini came from a noble family from Genoa.

== Career ==
Marini was appointed lector at the College of St. Thomas, the future Pontifical University of Saint Thomas Aquinas, Angelicum in Rome after 1624.

He was elected Master of the Dominican Order at the Chapter of 1650.

By order of Pope Urban VIII, he was not allowed to make any visitations, instead ruling the order by letter. He tried to check the growing number of polemical writings between the Dominicans and the Jesuits.

He died in 1669.

Catholic Church titles
Preceded by Tommaso Turco	Master of the Order of Preachers; 1650–1669	Succeeded by Juan Tomás de Rocaberti
