= Martial Auribelli =

Martial Auribelli (died 11 September 1473) was a French Dominican. He was head of his Order from 1453 to 1462, when he was deposed in favour of a papal candidate, Conrad of Asti. He was again Master-General from 1465 to 1473.

He was opposed by the reformer Johannes de Turrecremata, influential at the papal curia. Auribelli's concern was that reform of the Dominicans would split the Order into less and more observant parts, as had happened to the Franciscans.

== Notes ==
Preceded by Guy Flamochet	Master General of the Dominican Order; 1453–1462, 1465–1473	Succeeded by Conrad of Asti; Leonardo Mansueti
