= Albertus de Chiavari =

Albertus de Chiavari (1250–1300) was an Italian Dominican friar who served as the 10th Master of the Order of Preachers in the year 1300. He was appointed to role of Master by Pope Boniface VIII, after completing his studies in France. He contested the bull Super cathedram, issued in 1300, which limited the autonomy of the Dominicans. He also commented on the ancient masters of philosophy. He died after only three months in office.

Preceded by Nicola Boccasini	Master General of the Dominican Order; 1300	Succeeded by Bernard de Jusix
