= Laerzio Cherubini =

Laerzio Cherubini (ca. 1556–1626), also known as Laertius Cherobini, was an Italian criminal lawyer and jurisconsult in Rome. He is known for publishing the first Bullarium, and for commissioning Caravaggio's Death of the Virgin for Santa Maria della Scala in Trastevere, Rome.

Cherubini was born in Norcia. He took up the profession of avvocato, but made his reputation as civic magistrate and legal historian. He also possessed a strong entrepreneurial streak, dealing in loans with guaranteed interest made on revenues from offices in the Roman Curia. His clients included Ascanio Colonna, the brother of the poet Vittoria Colonna.

Cherubini served as deputy for the governor of Rome in civil suits, as criminal magistrate at Viterbo, and as judge secondo laterale in the Campidoglio. In 1586, Cherubini published a series of papal bulls from the time of Pope Leo I up to Sixtus V, the Bullarium, sive Collectio diversarum Constitutionum multorum Pontificum. In 1588, Cherubini published a series of thirty-two bans issued by Mariano Pierbenedetti, the governor of Rome. In 1601, he was made Conservatore of Rome.

Cherubini was also a patron of the arts. On 14 June 1601, he commissioned Caravaggio to paint his Death of the Virgin for his family chapel. Rejected by the fathers of the church, the painting was sold in 1607 to the Duke of Mantua.
