= Paolo Constabile =

Paolo Constabile (died 1582) was the Master of the Order of Preachers from 1580 to 1582.

== Biography ==
A native of Ferrara, Constabile got into trouble with the Holy Office as a young man, but later became an inquisitor himself, later becoming Master of the Sacred Palace.

At the Dominican chapter held in 1580, he was the preferred candidate of Cardinal Bonelli for Master of the Order of Preachers. As master, he visited the Grand Duchy of Tuscany and the Kingdom of Sicily.

He died in Bologna in 1582.

Catholic Church titles
Preceded by Serafino Cavalli	Master of the Order of Preachers; 1580–1582	Succeeded by Sisto Fabri
