= Barnaba Cagnoli =

Italian friar (ca.1262 – 1332)

Barnaba Cagnoli (c.1262 – 1332) was an Italian friar from Vercelli.

He was born around the year 1262 and became the provincial of Lombardy from 1305 to 1313 and from 1319 to 1324.

In 1317 he was named inquisitor and defender of the faith for Asti and Piedmont.

After the finish of his second provinciality, he was appointed as papal legate in Piedmont by John XXII, reducing the princes and marquess from that region to the unit and the peace, therefore before they were separated of the Church and in war among itself. In 1324 he was elected Master general of the Dominican Order, serving until his death in Paris in 1332.

| Preceded by Hervé de Nédellec | Master General of the Dominican Order; 1324 – 1332 | Succeeded by Hugh de Vaucemain |
