= Gerard de Daumar =

French Dominican (died 1343)

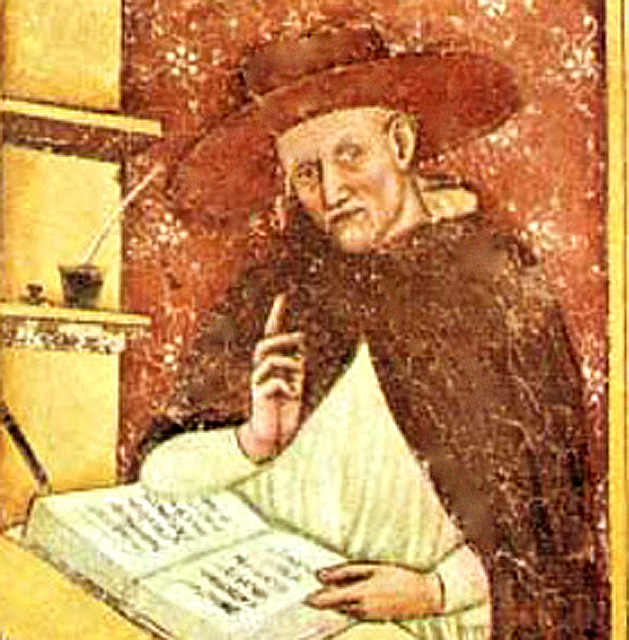
Gérard Garde Painting

Gerard de Daumar de la Garde was a French Dominican priest from Limoges. In 1342 he was elected Master General of the Dominican order, but in the same year, on 20 September, was created cardinal with the title of Santa Sabina and resigned as general. He died in Avignon on 28 September 1343.

Preceded by Hugh de Vaucemain	Master General of the Dominican Order; 1342	Succeeded by Pierre de Baume
