= Alexandre Vincent Jandel =

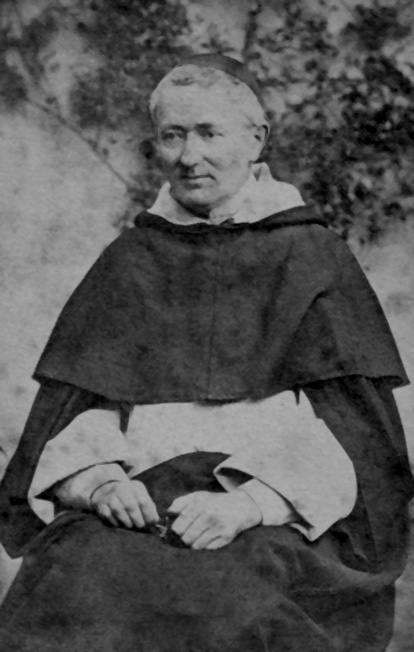
Alexandre Vincent Jandel (1810-1872)

Alexandre Vincent Jandel (born in Gerbéviller, Lorraine, 18 July 1810; died in Rome, 11 December 1872) was a French Dominican, who became Master of the Order of Preachers.

After a college course at Nancy, he entered the diocesan seminary there. He was ordained priest on 20 September 1834, then appointed professor of Scripture, and soon afterwards rector of the seminary at Pont-à-Mousson. At this time he became acquainted with figures including Bautain, Gerbet, Maria Alphonse Ratisbonne, and Jean-Baptiste Henri Lacordaire. Such was the impression made on him by Lacordaire, that he began to think of entering the Dominican Order, hoping to restore it in France, where it had been destroyed by the French Revolution.

In 1839 he therefore went to Rome, consulted Pope Gregory XVI on the matter, and finally received the habit on 15 May 1841. Two years afterwards Jandel and Lacordaire commenced the work of re-establishing their order in France. The Catholic Encyclopedia describes Jandel as "a ruler of men: calm, grave, sagacious, tenacious of traditions and customs, and pre-eminently practical", and recounts story in which a sermon at Lyon on the power of the Cross led to Jandel being challenged by a Freemason to prove the truth of his words in the lodge; Jandel supposedly entered it, produced his crucifix, and made the sign of the cross, instantly extinguishing the lights, throwing about the furniture, and causing the occupants to flee. Many persons in France placed themselves under his guidance. Pope Pius IX, however, called him to Rome, and made him in 1850 vicar-general of the order ad beneplacitum, and in 1855 general for six years.

Under Jandel's stewardship, several provinces of his order were re-established, and houses opened everywhere. He also contributed to the growth of the second and third orders of Dominican nuns, promoted devotion to the rosary, and propagated the doctrine of Thomas Aquinas. Such were the services he rendered to the Holy See especially as regarded the Zouaves, that Pius IX, who was warmly attached to him, intended to make him a cardinal; but he was elected general of the order, on 7 June 1862.

He visited Ireland twice, and only weak health prevented him from visiting America. New editions of liturgical books and of the "constitutions" or legislation formed part of his characteristic work. He also paid great attention to foreign missions. During his term of office sixteen Dominicans were beatified or canonized. He presided at two chapters of the order, and the Catholic Encyclopedia considers him one of its greatest generals.

Preceded by Vincenzo Ajello	Master General of the Dominican Order; 1850 – 1872	Succeeded by Giuseppe M. Sanvito
