= Stefano Usodimare =

Stefano Usodimare (died 1557), also known as Ususmaris, was the Master of the Order of Preachers from 1553 to 1557.

== Biography ==
Usodimare was from Genoa, the son of a Spanish family. At the Dominican chapter of 1553, he was the preferred candidate of Pope Julius III, and was elected master. Pope Paul IV made him a cardinal in 1557. He died later in 1557.

Catholic Church titles
Preceded by Francesco Romeo	Master of the Order of Preachers; 1553–1557	Succeeded by Vincenzo Giustiniani
