= Tomás Ripoll =

Spanish preacher (1652–1747)

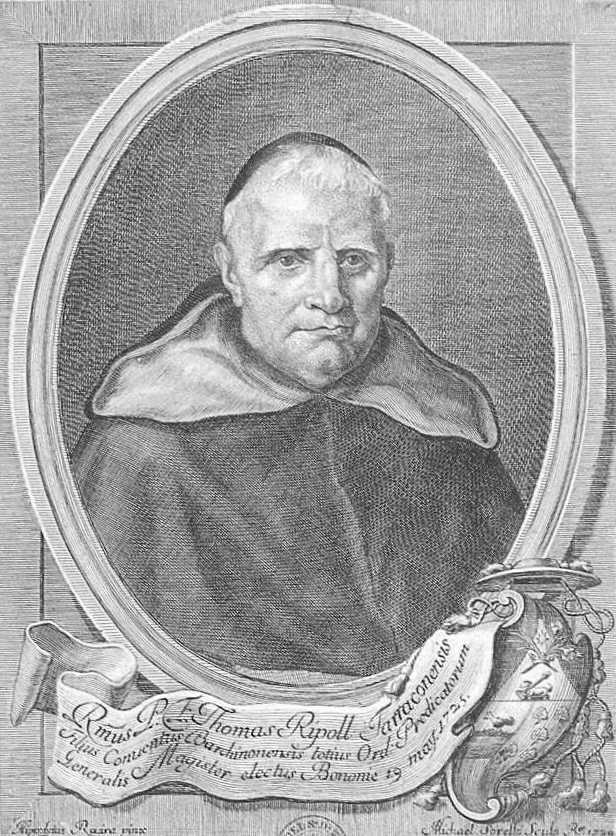
Tomás Ripoll

Tomás Ripoll (1652–1747) was the Master of the Order of Preachers from 1725 to 1747.

== Biography ==
Tomás Ripoll was a contemplative Dominican from Tarragona in the province of Aragon. He was a socius of two of the masters of his order, Antonin Cloche in 1702 with the title "Provincial of the Holy Land", and Agustín Pipia.

In 1722 Ripoll was Provincial for the province of Aragon.

A General Chapter of the Dominican Order elected him master in 1725. As master, Ripoll made no visitations. He oversaw completion of the historical documents of the Dominican Order. The Jansenist controversy was brought to a head under his mastership. In 1740, Ripoll's friend Prospero Lorenzo Lambertini was elected pope, taking the regnal name of Pope Benedict XIV.

Ripoll died in 1747 on September at the age of 95.

Catholic Church titles
Preceded by Agustín Pipia	Master of the Order of Preachers; 1725–1747	Succeeded by Antonin Brémond
