= Jean du Feynier =

French Catholic priest (died 1538)

Jean du Feynier (died 1538) was the Master of the Order of Preachers from 1532 to 1538.

== Biography ==
Feynier was a French native of Bern. The Dominican chapter held at Rome in 1532 elected him Master of the Order of Preachers. As master, he visited Spain and the Kingdom of Portugal and then moved on to the Kingdom of France. In France, he was imprisoned because: (1) he was a friend of Charles V, Holy Roman Emperor, and (2) he refused to allow Francis I of France to impose Jeanne d'Amboise as prioress of the Dominican convent at Prouille. He was released in 1538 and died a short time later.

Catholic Church titles
Preceded by Paolo Butigella	Master of the Order of Preachers; 1532–1538	Succeeded by Agostino Recuperati
