= Serafino Cavalli =

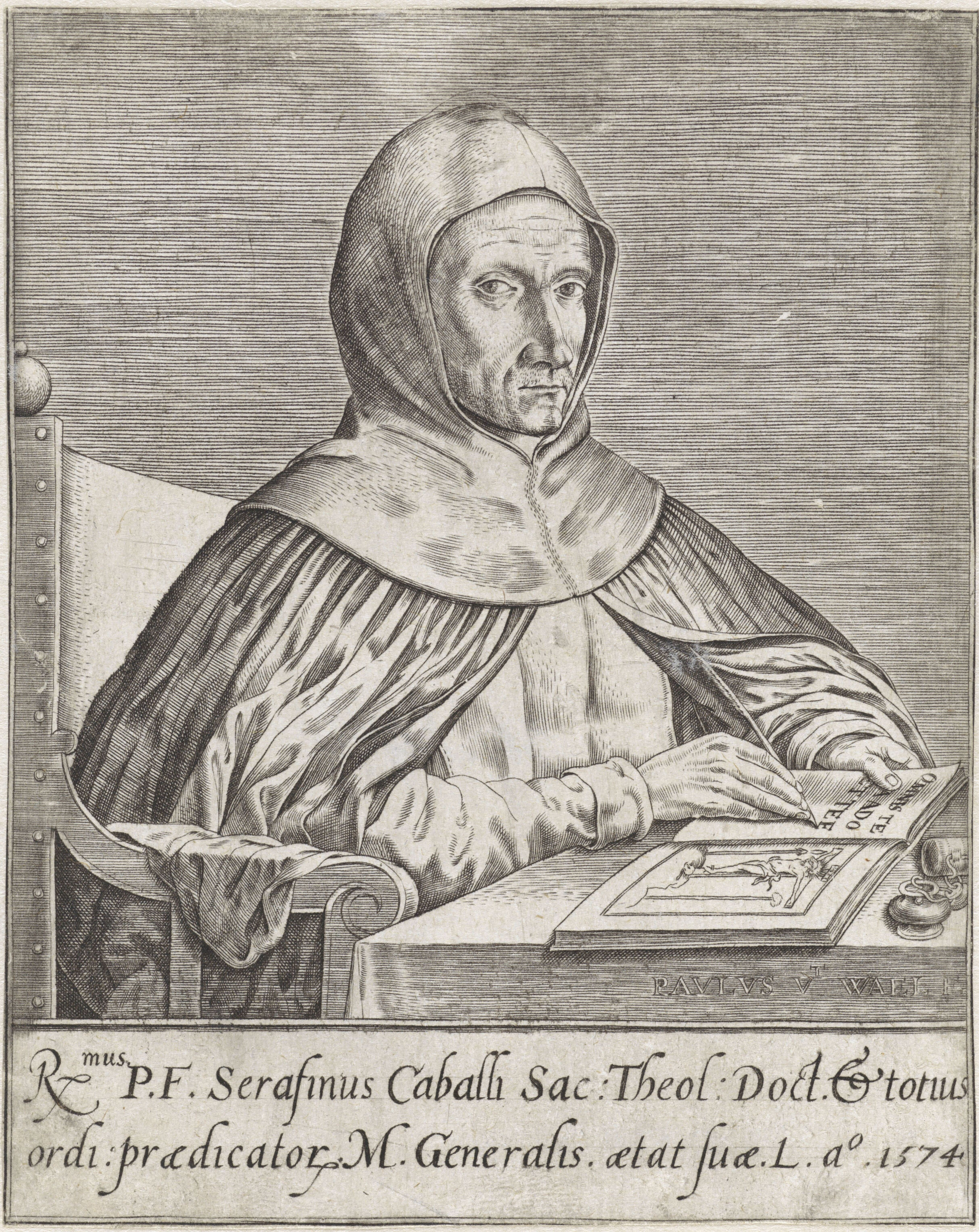
Serafino Cavalli

Serafino Cavalli (died 1578) was the Master of the Order of Preachers from 1571 to 1578.

A native of Brescia, Cavalli served as a member of the Holy Office under Pope Paul IV. Upon Paul IV's death in 1559, he was nearly killed by a mob that stormed the Vatican. He accompanied his predecessor as Master of the Order of Preachers, Vincenzo Giustiniani during his visitation of Spain and at the Council of Trent.

Cavalli was elected Master of the Order of Preachers at the Dominican chapter of 1571, presided over by Pope Pius V. During his time as master, he completed a visitation of the Grand Duchy of Tuscany, Lombardy, the Kingdom of France, and the Low Countries. In 1577, he visited Spain and the Kingdom of Naples.

He died in Seville in 1578.

Catholic Church titles
Preceded by Vincenzo Giustiniani	Master of the Order of Preachers; 1571–1578	Succeeded by Paolo Constabile
