= Raymond of Capua =

Leading member of the Dominican Order

Blessed Raymond of Capua O.P.
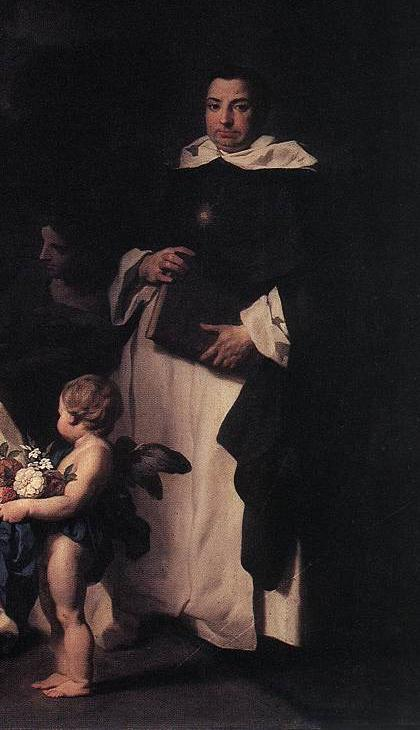

Master General of the Order of Preachers
- Born: ca. 1330; Capua, Kingdom of Naples
- Died: 5 October 1399 (aged 69); Nuremberg, Holy Roman Empire
- Venerated in: Roman Catholic Church
- Beatified: 15 May 1899, Saint Peter's Basilica, Kingdom of Italy by Pope Leo XIII
- Major shrine: Church of San Domenico Maggiore, Naples, Italy
- Feast: 5 October
- Attributes: Dominican habit

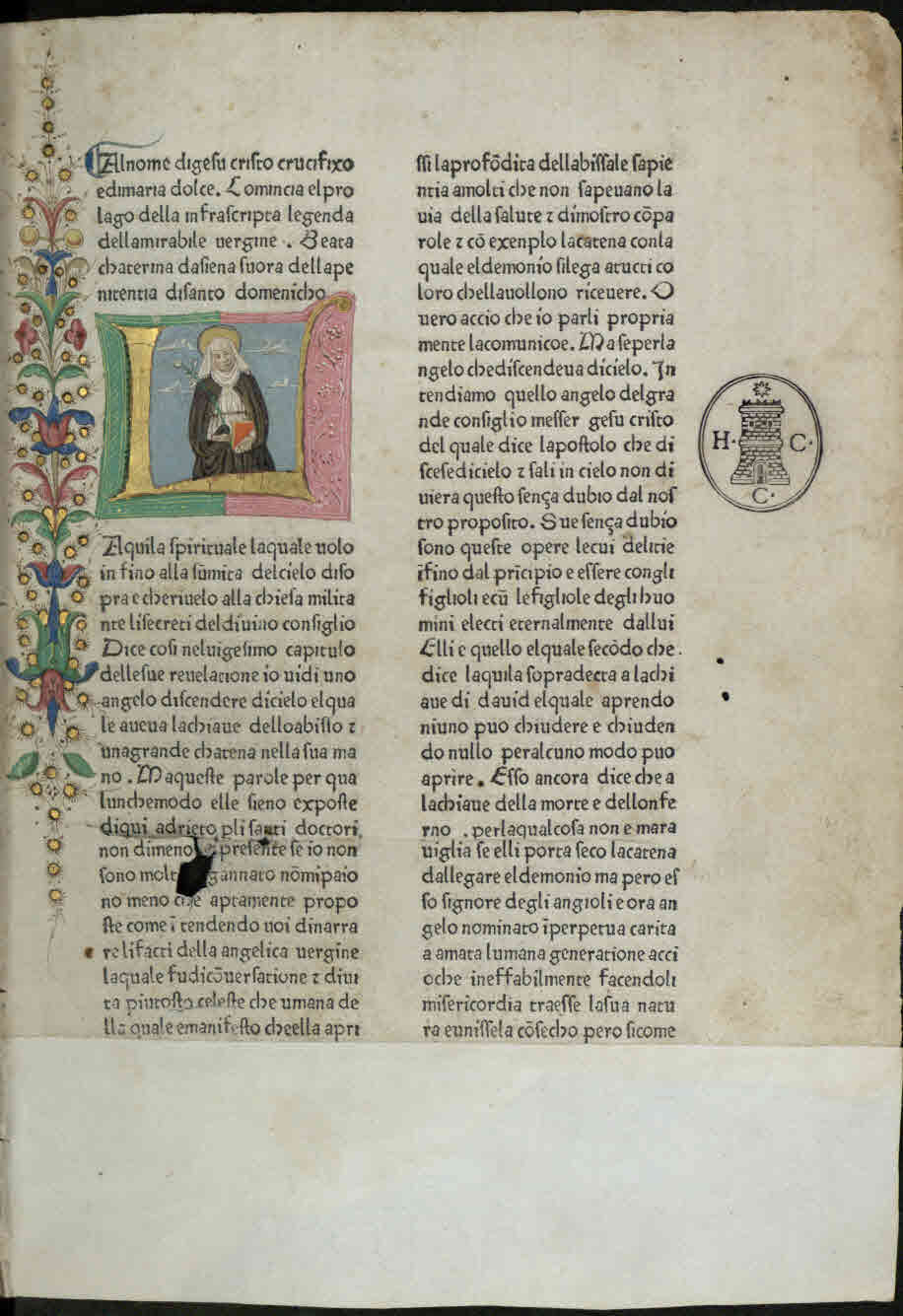
Legenda maior sanctae Catharinae Senensis, 1477

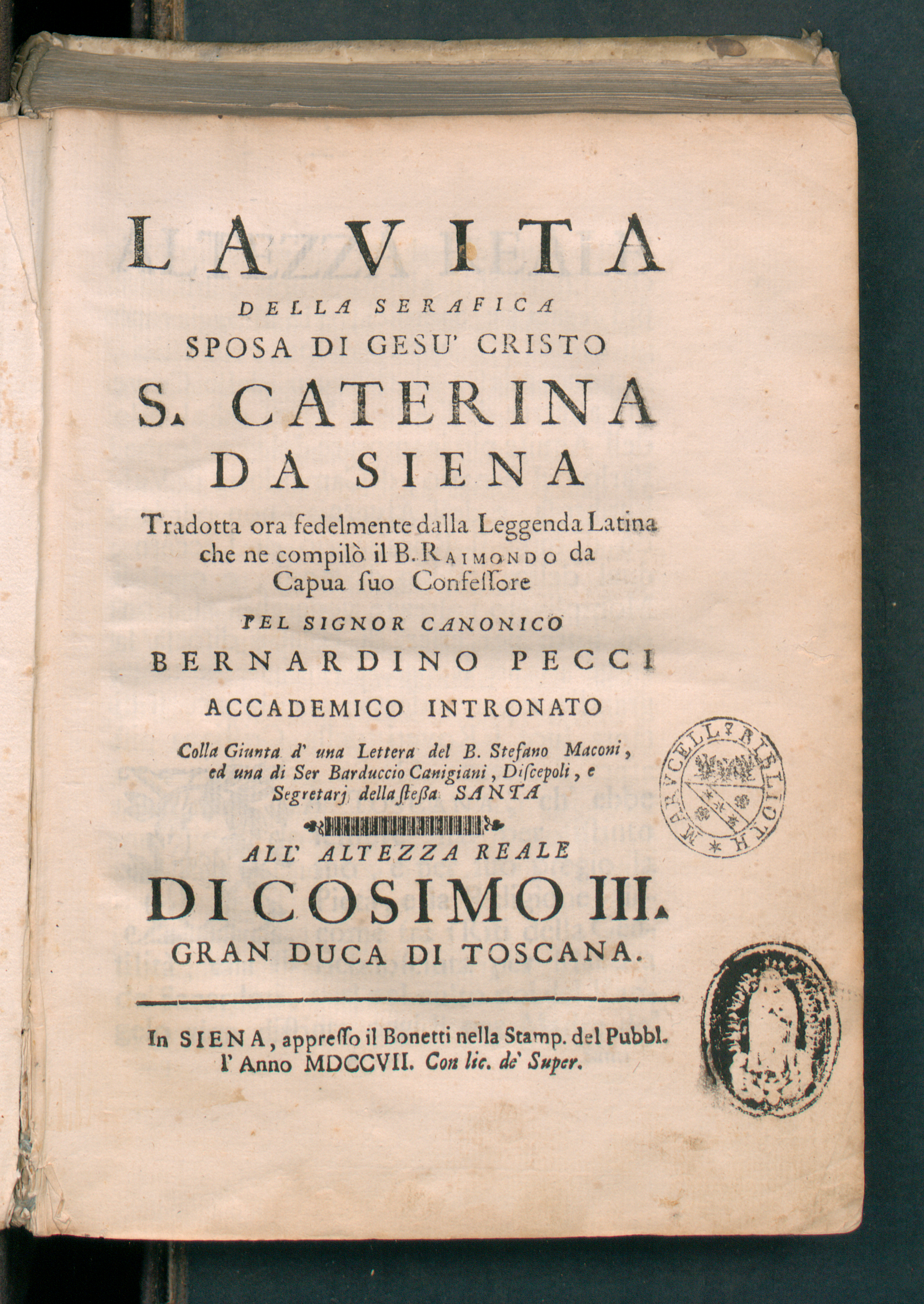
La vita di Santa Caterina da Siena (Legenda maior), 1707

Raymond of Capua, (ca. 1330 – 5 October 1399) was a leading member of the Dominican Order and served as its Master General from 1380 until his death. First as Prior Provincial of Lombardy and then as Master General of the Order, Raymond undertook the restoration of Dominican religious life. For his success in this endeavor, he is referred to as its "second founder".

Raymond worked also for the return of the papacy to Rome and for a solution to the Western Schism. The important mystic and author, Catherine of Siena, accepted him as a spiritual director because of his burning passion for the Church and for the revival of religious life. He was beatified by the Catholic Church in 1899.

== Life ==
He was born "Raymond della Vigna" about 1330 in Capua (then part of the Kingdom of Naples), a member of a prominent family of that city, and was a descendant of Pietro della Vigna (a figure mentioned in Dante's Divine Comedy). In 1350, while a student of law at the University of Bologna, he entered the Dominican Order. For the next twenty-five years he worked as a spiritual director or as a teacher in various communities of the Order.

Raymond was first assigned to Montepulciano, where he served as a chaplain to a monastery of nuns of the Dominican Second Order. He was the first biographer of their venerated former prioress, Agnes of Montepulciano, who had died about fifty years earlier. He was then stationed in Rome, to serve as the prior of the friars at Santa Maria sopra Minerva. Later he was sent to Siena, where he was assigned by the Master General to be the spiritual director and confessor to the noted Dominican tertiary, Catherine of Siena.

Raymond spent the next six years advising her and hearing her confessions. While there, Raymond gradually learned to trust her holiness and her judgment. This was sealed when he became involved in nursing victims of a plague in 1374. When he contracted the disease himself and lay near death, Catherine came and sat at his bedside until he recovered. Knowing how close he was to death, Raymond credited his recovery to her prayers.

By 1374 Raymond had come to the attention of Pope Gregory XI, then living in Avignon, as a result of his connection to Catherine, and also for his novel ways of confronting issues like the Crusades in the Holy Land, the return of the papacy to Rome, and the general reform of the Church. He was well known for his ability to pass seamlessly from dealing with spiritual and supernatural considerations to the more mundane matters of practical politics. For four years Raymond accompanied Catherine in her journeys, and went to Avignon to act as an intermediary between her and the pope. Catherine had such faith in the commitment of the pope to the cause of a Crusade, that she sent a personal letter to the infamous English pirate, John Hawkwood, asking him to re-direct his efforts to the service of God in this cause.

Pope Gregory would finally return to Rome in 1377, but he died in 1378. The refusal of the French cardinals to accept the election of his successor, Pope Urban VI, led to the Great Western Schism that lasted 39 years, with one pope in Rome and another in Avignon. This schism divided Europe. Raymond, like Catherine, supported the Roman papacy and defended its legitimacy.

In 1379 by command of Pope Urban VI Raymond was examined by Fra. Giacomo Altoviti who promoted him to the grade of Master of Theology.

In the year 1380, Catherine died and Raymond was elected Master General of Dominican Order. He then divided his time between Italy and Germany. In the Caterinian spirit of reform, he gave a new spiritual vitality to the Order. Raymond favored the development of a new interpretation of "observance", for which he drew upon the Franciscan example. In this work he gained the designation of being the second founder of the Order of the Preachers.

== Veneration ==
Raymond was buried first in Nuremberg (now Germany), where he died, but his body was later moved to Naples, to the Church of San Domenico Maggiore. In 1899 Pope Leo XIII beatified him on the 500th anniversary of his death.

== Modern Editions and Translations ==
- Legenda maior, ed. Silvia Nocentini (Edizioni del Galluzzo, 2013): A critical edition of his Vita of Catherine of Siena
- The Life of St. Catherine of Siena, trans. George Lamb (Harvill Press, 1960): An English translation of the Legenda maior
- P. Tylus (ed.), La 'Legenda Maior' de Raymond de Capoue en français ancien (= Textes vernaculaires du moyen age, 15). Turnhout: Brepols Publishers, 2015. (an edition of two Middle French translations of the Raymond of Capua's Legenda maior.

Preceded by Elias Raymond	Master General of the Dominican Order; 1380 – 1399	Succeeded by Tommaso Paccaroni
