= Antonin Brémond =

Antonin Brémond was the Master of the Order of Preachers from 1748 to 1755.

== Biography ==
Antonin Brémond was a Dominican friar from the Province of Toulouse. He worked as a missionary in Martinique for five years. Under the previous master of his order, Tomás Ripoll, he was an editor of the Order's documents. He also wrote a Useful Manual of the Christian Life for the children of James II of England, who were then in exile in Rome.

He was elected master of the order by acclamation at a General Chapter held in 1748. In poor health, he accomplished little as master, dying in 1755.

Catholic Church titles
Preceded by Tomás Ripoll	Master of the Order of Preachers; 1748–1755	Succeeded by Juan Tomás de Boxadors
