= Master of the Order of Preachers =

Leader of the Dominicans

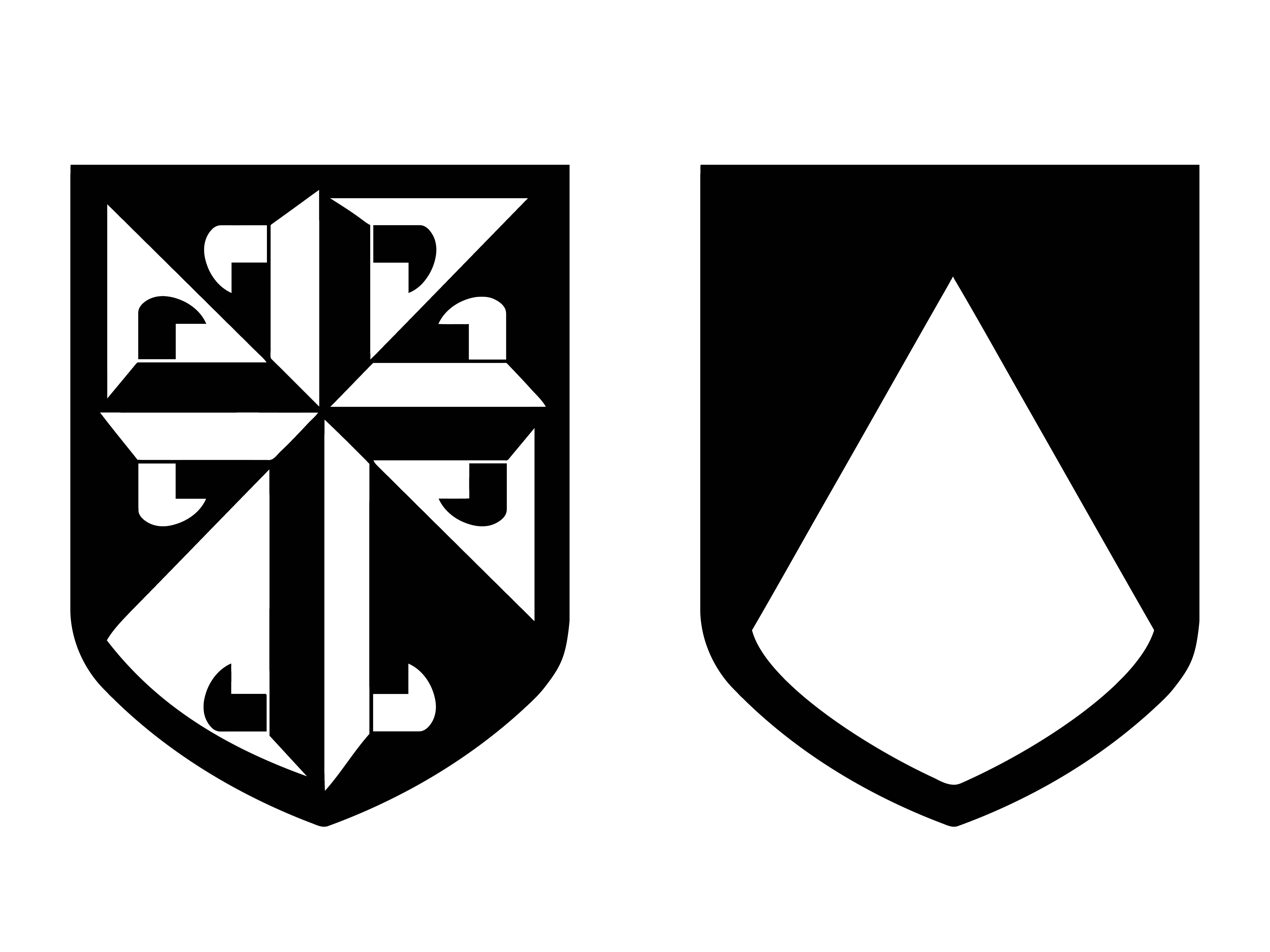
- Coats of arms of the Dominican Order

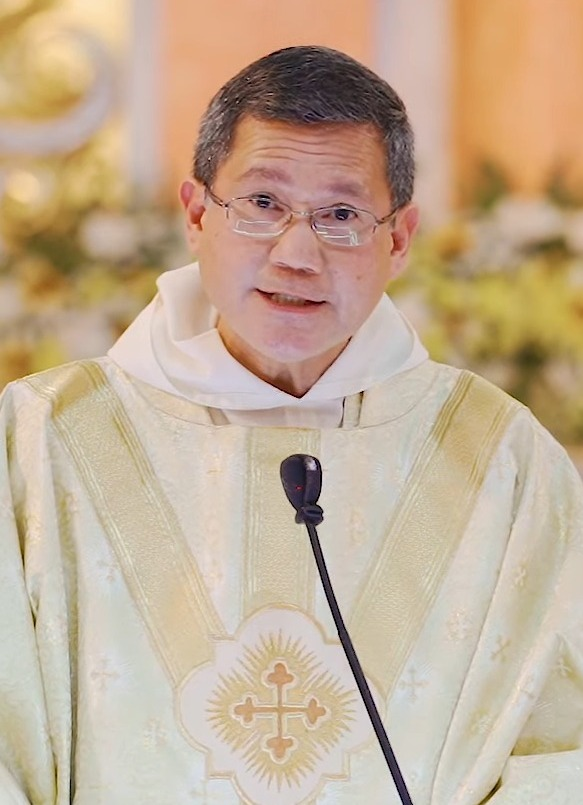
- Incumbent; Gerard Timoner III since 13 July 2019
- Type: Religious order head
- Member of: Pontifical University of Saint Thomas Aquinas and Pontifical and Royal University of Santo Tomas (as Grand Chancellor)
- First holder: Domingo de Guzmán (St Dominic)
- Website: www.op.org

The Master of the Order of Preachers is the Superior General of the Order of Preachers, commonly known as the Dominicans.

The Master of the Order of Preachers is ex officio Grand Chancellor of the Pontifical University of Saint Thomas Aquinas, Angelicum in Rome, Italy, and of the Pontifical and Royal University of Santo Tomas in Manila, Philippines.

Fr. Gerard Francisco Timoner III serves as Master of the Order, since his 2019 election at the General Chapter held in Biên Hòa.

== Masters of the Order ==
| No. | Image | Master | Nationality | Tenure | Notes |
|---|---|---|---|---|---|
| 1 | | Domingo Félix de Guzmán (1170–1221) | Spain | 1216–1221 | Founder of the Order of Preachers; Canonized: 13 July 1234 by Pope Gregory IX |
| 2 | | Jordan von Sachsen (c. 1190–1237) | Germany | 1222–1237 | Beatified: 10 May 1826 by Pope Leo XII |
| 3 | | Raimundo de Peñafort (c. 1175–1275) | Spain | 1238–1240 | Beatified: 1542 by Pope Paul III; Canonized: 29 April 1601 by Pope Clement VIII |
| 4 | | Johannes von Wildeshausen (c. 1180–1252) | Germany | 1241–1252 | Bishop of Bosnia (1233–1237); Declared "Servant of God" |
| 5 | | Humbert of Romans (1200–1277) | France | 1254–1263 | |
| 6 | | Giovanni Garbella (c. 1205–1283) | Italy | 1264–1283 | Beatified: 7 September 1903 by Pope Pius X |
| 7 | | Munio de Zamora (1237–1300) | Spain | 1285–1291 | Bishop of Palencia (1294–1296) |
| 8 | | Stephen de Besançon (c. 1250–1294) | France | 1292–1294 | |
| 9 | | Niccolo Boccasini (1240–1304) | Italy | 1296–1298 | Pope (1303–1304); Beatified: 24 April 1736 by Pope Clement XII |
| 10 | | Alberto de Chiavari (1250–1300) | Italy | 1300 | |
| 11 | | Bernard de Jusix (died 1303) | France | 1301–1303 | |
| 12 | | Aimerico di Piacenza (died 1327) | Italy | 1304–1311 | |
| 13 | | Bérenger de Landore (1262–1330) | France | 1312–1317 | Archbishop of Santiago de Compostela (1317–1330) |
| 14 | | Hervaeus de Nédellec (c. 1260–1323) | France | 1318–1323 | |
| 15 | | Barnaba Cagnoli (1262?-1332) | Italy | 1324–1332 | |
| 16 | | Hugh of Vaucemain (died 1341) | France | 1333–1341 | |
| 17 | | Gerard de Daumar (died 1343) | France | 1342 | |
| 18 | | Pierre de Baume (?) | France | 1343–1345 | |
| 19 | | Garin de Gy (?) | France | 1346–1348 | |
| 20 | | Jean de Moulins (1304–1353) | France | 1349–1350 | |
| 21 | | Simon de Langres (died 1384) | France | 1352–1366 | Bishop of Vannes (1382–1383) |
| 22 | | Elias Raymond (died 1389) | France | 1367–1380 | |
| 23 | | Raimondo delle Vigne | Italy | 1380–1399 | Beatified: 15 May 1899 by Pope Leo XIII |
| 24 | | Tommaso Paccaroni (?) | Italy | 1401–1414 | |
| 25 | | Leonardo Dati (1360–1425) | Italy | 1414–1425 | |
| 26 | | Barthélémy Texier (died 1449) | France | 1426–1449 | |
| 27 | | Pierre Rochin (?) | France | 1450 | |
| 28 | | Guy Flamochet (?) | France | 1451 | |
| 29 | | Martial Auribelli (1473) | France | 1453–1462; 1465–1473 | |
| 30 | | Conrad of Asti (died 1470) | Italy | 1462–1465 | |
| 31 | | Leonardo Mansueti (1414–1480) | Italy | 1474–1480 | |
| 32 | | Salvo Cassetta (1413––1483) | Italy | 1481–1483 | |
| 33 | | Bartolomeo Comazzi (?) | Italy | 1484–1485 | |
| 34 | | Barnaba Sansoni (?) | Italy | 1486 | |
| 35 | | Gioacchino Torriani (1417–1500) | Italy | 1487–1500 | |
| 36 | | Vincenzo Bandello (1435–1506) | Italy | 1501–1506 | |
| 37 | | Jean Clérée (1450–1507) | France | 1507 | |
| 38 | | Tommaso Gaetano Vio (1469–1534) | Italy | 1508–1518 | Cardinal |
| 39 | | Juan García de Loaysa Mendoza (1478–1546) | Spain | 1518–1524 | |
| 40 | | Francesco Silvestri (c. 1474–1528) | Italy | 1525–1528 | |
| 41 | | Paolo Butigella (1475–1531) | Italy | 1530–1531 | |
| 42 | | Jean du Feynier (died 1538) | France | 1532–1538 | |
| 43 | | Agostino Recuperati (died 1540) | Italy | 1539–1540 | |
| 44 | | Alberto de las Casas (1481–1544) | Spain | 1542–1544 | |
| 45 | | Francesco Romeo (died 1552) | Italy | 1546–1552 | |
| 46 | | Stefano Usodimare (died 1557) | Italy | 1553–1557 | |
| 47 | | Vincenzo Giustiniani (1516–1582) | Italy | 1558–1570 | |
| 48 | | Serafino Cavalli (c. 1521–1578) | Italy | 1571–1578 | |
| 49 | | Paolo Constabile (died 1582) | Italy | 1580–1582 | |
| 50 | | Sisto Fabri (1540–1594) | Italy | 1583–1589 | |
| 51 | | Ippolito Maria Beccaria (1550–1600) | Italy | 1589–1600 | |
| 52 | | Jerónimo Xavierre Pérez (1546–1608) | Spain | 1601–1607 | Cardinal |
| 53 | | Agostino Galamini (1553–1639) | Italy | 1608–1612 | Titular Bishop of Santa Maria in Aracoeli; Cardinal |
| 54 | | Serafino Secchi (died 1628) | Italy | 1612–1628 | |
| 55 | | Niccolò Ridolfi (1578–1650) | Italy | 1629–1642 | |
| 56 | | Tommaso Turco (died 1649) | Italy | 1644–1649 | |
| 57 | | Giovanni Battista de Marinis (1597–1669) | Italy | 1650–1669 | |
| 58 | | Juan Tomás de Rocaberti (1627–1699) | Spain | 1670–1677 | Archbishop of Valencia (1677–1699) |
| 59 | | Antonio de Monroy Hijar (1634–1715) | Mexico | 1677–1686 | Archbishop of Santiago de Compostela (1685–1715) |
| 60 | | Antonin Cloche (1628–1720) | France | 1686–1720 | |
| 61 | | Agostino Pipia (1660–1730) | Italy | 1721–1725 | Cardinal |
| 62 | | Tomás Ripoll Vera (1653–1747) | Spain | 1725–1747 | |
| 63 | | Antonin Brémond (1692–1755) | France | 1748–1755 | |
| 64 | | Juan Tomás de Boxadors (1703–1780) | Spain | 1756–1777 | Cardinal |
| 65 | | Baltasar de Quiñones (1733–1798) | Spain | 1777–1798 | |
| 66 | | Pio Giuseppe Gaddi (?) | Italy | 1798–1819 | |
| 67 | | Joaquín Briz (1778–1837) | Spain | 1825–1831 | Bishop of Segovia (1831–1837) |
| 68 | | Francesco Ferdinando Jabalot (?) | Italy | 1832–1834 | |
| 69 | | Maurizio Benedetto Olivieri (1769–1845) | Italy | 1834–1835 | |
| 70 | | Tommaso Giacinto Cipolletti (1782–1850) | Italy | 1835–1838 | |
| 71 | | Angelo Domenico Ancarani (died 1849) | Italy | 1838–1844 | |
| 72 | | Vincenzo Ajello (died 1858) | Italy | 1844–1850 | |
| 73 | | Alexandre Vincent Jandel (1810–1872) | France | 1850–1872 (Note: Following Jandel's death in 1872, the Order was unable to hold an elective province in Europe until the end of the 1870s. Giuseppe Maria Sanvito administered the Order until José Maria Larroca's election as Master General in 1879.) | |
| 74 | | José María Larroca Estala (1813–1891) | Spain | 1879–1891 | |
| 75 | | Andreas Franz Frühwirth (1845–1933) | Austria | 1891–1904 | Titular Archbishop of Heraclea in Europe (1907–1933); Cardinal |
| 76 | | Hyacinthe-Marie Cormier (1832–1916) | France | 1904–1916 | Declared "Venerable": 14 May 1983; Beatified: 20 November 1994 by Pope John Paul II |
| 77 | | Ludovicus Theissling (1856–1925) | Netherlands | 1916–1925 | |
| 78 | | Buenaventura García de Paredes (1866–1936) | Spain | 1926–1929 | Martyr in odium fidei during Spanish Civil War; Declared "Venerable": 26 June 2006; Beatified: 28 October 2007 by Cardinal Saraiva Martins |
| 79 | | Martin-Marie-Stanislas Gillet (1875–1951) | France | 1929–1946 | Titular Archbishop of Nicaea (1946–1951) |
| 80 | | Manuel Suárez Fernández (1895–1954) | Spain | 1946–1954 | |
| 81 | | Michael Browne (1887–1971) | Ireland | 1955–1962 | Titular Archbishop of Idebessus (1962); Cardinal |
| 82 | | Aniceto Fernández Alonso (1895–1981) | Spain | 1962–1974 | |
| 83 | | Vincent de Couesnongle (1916–1992) | France | 1974–1983 | |
| 84 | | Damian Byrne (1929–1996) | Ireland | 1983–1992 | |
| 85 | | Timothy Radcliffe (born 1945) | United Kingdom | 1992–2001 | Cardinal |
| 86 | | Carlos Alfonso Azpiroz Costa (born 1956) | Argentina | 2001–2010 | Archbishop of Bahia Blanca (2015–present) |
| 87 | | Bruno Cadoré (born 1954) | France | 2010–2019 | |
| 88 | | Gerard Timoner III (born 1968) | Philippines | 2019–present | |

== See also ==
- Dominican Order
