= Symposium (Plato) =

Socratic dialogue by Plato

- Συμπόσιον
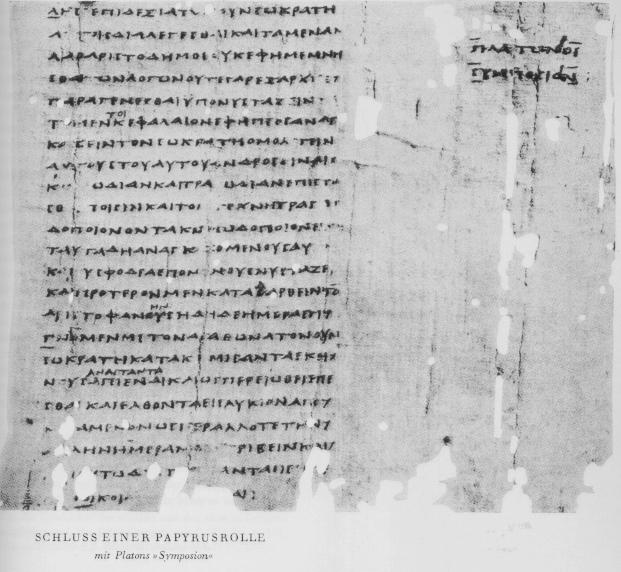
- Papyrus Oxyrhynchus 843, a 2nd century papyrus roll containing the Symposium
- Also known as: On the Good
- Author(s): Plato
- Compiled by: Thrasyllus of Mendes
- Language: Attic Greek
- Date: c. 385 BC
- Provenance: Byzantine Empire
- Series: Dialogues of Plato
- Manuscript(s): List
- Principal manuscript(s): Codex Oxoniensis Clarkianus 39 (Oxford, Bodleian Library)
- First printed edition: 1513 by Aldus Manutius
- Genre: Socratic dialogue
- Subject: Eros, Platonic love
- Setting: Ancient Athens
- Personages: Socrates, Diotima, Alcibiades, Aristophanes
- Text: Symposium at Wikisource

The Symposium (Ancient Greek: Συμπόσιον, Symposion) is a Socratic dialogue by Plato, dated c. 385 – 370 BC. It depicts a friendly contest of extemporaneous speeches given by a group of notable Athenian men attending a banquet. The men include the philosopher Socrates, the general and statesman Alcibiades, and the comic playwright Aristophanes. The panegyrics are to be given in praise of Eros, the god of love and sex.

In the Symposium, Eros is recognized both as erotic lover and as a phenomenon capable of inspiring courage, valor, great deeds and works, and vanquishing man's natural fear of death. It is seen as transcending its earthly origins and attaining spiritual heights. The extraordinary elevation of the concept of love raises a question of whether some of the most extreme extents of meaning might be intended as humor or farce. Eros is almost always translated as "love", and the English word has its own varieties and ambiguities that provide additional challenges to the effort to understand the Eros of ancient Athens.

The dialogue is one of Plato's major works, and is appreciated for both its philosophical content and its literary qualities.

== Setting ==
The dialogue takes place at a banquet in the year 416 BC at the house of the tragedian Agathon in Athens.

=== Principal characters ===
The dialogue's seven main characters, who deliver major speeches, are:

- Phaedrus (speech begins 178a): an Athenian aristocrat associated with the inner-circle of the philosopher Socrates, familiar from Phaedrus and other dialogues
- Pausanias (speech begins 180c): the legal expert
- Eryximachus (speech begins 186a): a physician
- Aristophanes (speech begins 189c): the eminent comic playwright
- Agathon (speech begins 195a): a tragic poet, host of the banquet, that celebrates the triumph of his first tragedy
- Socrates (speech begins 201d): the eminent philosopher and Plato's teacher
- Alcibiades (speech begins 214e): a prominent Athenian statesman, orator, and general

=== Background ===
In Ancient Greece, a symposium was a type of banquet traditionally attended by a group of men, who would first partake in a meal, followed by drinking for pleasure, which was accompanied by music, dancing, recitals, or conversation. The setting means that the participants would be drinking wine, meaning that the men might be induced to say things they would not say elsewhere or when sober. They might speak more frankly, or take more risks, or else be prone to hubris—they might even be inspired to make speeches that are particularly heartfelt and noble.

The dialogue takes place in 416 BC, the year in which the host Agathon had the dramatic triumph mentioned in the text. The disastrous expedition to Syracuse, of which Alcibiades was a commander, took place the following year, after which Alcibiades deserted to Sparta, Athens' archenemy.

== Style, dating and authorship ==
Socrates is renowned for his Socratic method, which involves posing questions that encourage others to think deeply about what they care about and articulate their ideas. Unlike most of Plato's works, which take the form of a back-and-forth Socratic dialogue, between Socrates and one or more interlocutors, the Symposium is a series of speeches from different characters. However, the underlying philosophical method remains the same; examining the conflict in ideas between the different speeches can allow the reader to see the philosophy that underlies them all.

The work was written by Plato, no earlier than 385 BC—Aristophanes speech at 193a1–3 has been interpreted by ancient and modern scholars as an anachronistic reference to "the dissolution of Mantinea to Sparta" in 385/4 BC. The characters are historical, but this is not a report of historical events. There is no reason to doubt that they were composed entirely by Plato. The reader, understanding that Plato was not governed by the historical record, can read the Symposium, and ask why the author, Plato, arranged the story the way he did, and what he meant by including the various aspects of setting, composition, characters, and theme, etc.

== Synopsis ==
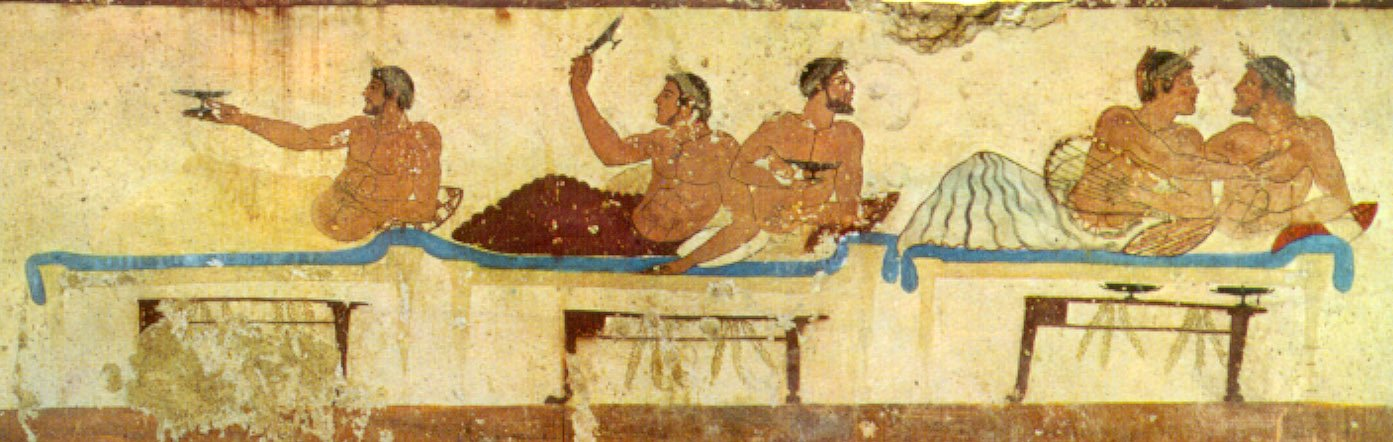
A fresco taken from the north wall of the Tomb of the Diver (from Paestum, Italy, c. 475 BC): a symposium scene

=== Frame story ===
Apollodorus of Phalerum—a passionate follower of Socrates—recounts the story of the symposium to an unnamed friend, having narrated the events to Glaucon while en route home the previous day. The banquet had been hosted by the poet Agathon to celebrate his first victory in a dramatic competition at the Dionysia of 416 BC. Though Apollodorus was not present at the event, which occurred when he was a boy, he heard the story from Aristodemus and confirmed the events with Socrates.

The story, as told by Apollodorus, then moves to the banquet at Agathon's home, where Agathon challenges each of the men to speak in praise of the Greek god, Eros.

Socrates is late to arrive because he became lost in thought on the way. When they are finished eating, Eryximachus takes the suggestion made by Phaedrus, that they should all make a speech in praise of Eros, the god of love and desire. It will be a competition of speeches to be judged by Dionysus. It is anticipated that the speeches will ultimately be bested by Socrates, who speaks last.

=== Phaedrus' speech ===
Phaedrus opens with the claim that Eros is the oldest of the gods, citing Hesiod, Acusilaus and Parmenides, and argues that being the oldest implies that the benefits conferred by Eros are the greatest. Eros provides guidance through shame; for example, by inspiring a lover to earn the admiration of his beloved into showing bravery on the battlefield, since nothing shames a man more than to be seen by his beloved committing an inglorious act. Lovers sometimes sacrifice their lives for their beloved. As evidence for this, he mentions some mythological heroes and lovers. Even Achilles, who was the beloved of Patroclus, sacrificed himself to avenge his lover, and Alcestis was willing to die for her husband Admetus. Phaedrus concludes his short speech reiterating his statements that love is one of the most ancient gods, the most honored, the most powerful in helping men gain honor and blessedness—and sacrificing one's self for love will result in rewards from the gods.

=== Pausanias' speech ===
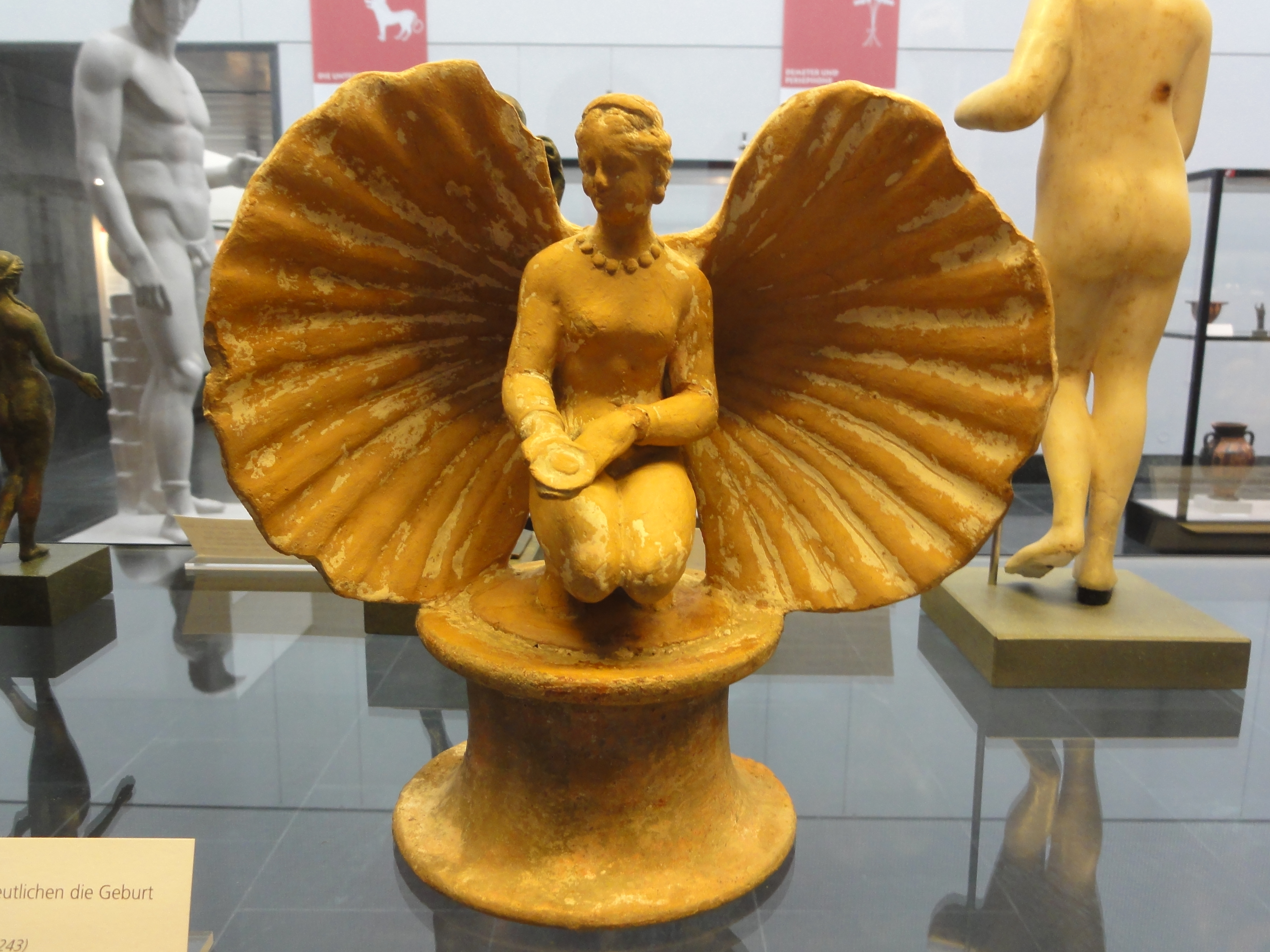
A terracotta figurine of Aphrodite Urania, c. 3rd century BC. Aphrodite Urania symbolized an elevated, more spiritual love, as opposed to the more earthly and lustful Aphrodite Pandemos.

Inspired by the cults of Aphrodite Pandemos and Aphrodite Urania, Pausanias—the legal expert of the group—introduces a distinction between vulgar (Πάνδημος) and heavenly (Οὐρανία) love. Vulgar Love is in search of sexual gratification, and his objects are women and boys; Heavenly Love is the pederastic love towards young men (after the age when his beard starts to grow), which produce the benefits described by Phaedrus.

Pausanias contrasts common desire with a "heavenly" love between an older man and a young man, in which the two exchange sexual pleasure while the older man imparts wisdom to the younger one. He distinguishes between this virtuous love, and the love of an older man for a young (immature) boy, which he says should be forbidden on the grounds that love should be based on qualities of intelligence and virtue that are not yet part of a boy's makeup and may not develop.

He then analyses the attitudes of different city-states on pederastic love. The first distinction he makes is between the cities that clearly establish what is and what is not admitted, and those that are not so explicitly clear, like Athens and Sparta. In the first group there are cities favorable to pederastic love, like Elis, Boeotia l, or unfavorable to it like Ionia and Persia. The case of Athens is analyzed with many examples of what would be acceptable and what would not, and at the end, he makes the assertion that Athens' code of behavior favors the nobler type of love and discourages the baser.

=== Eryximachus' speech ===
Though it is Aristophanes' turn, a bout of hiccups prevent him from speaking, and Eryximachus—the physician—takes his turn, prescribing various hiccup cures in the interim. Eryximachus claims love affects everything in the universe, including plants and animals; once love is attained, it should be protected. Eros not only directs everything on the human plane, but also on the divine. Two forms of love occur in the human body—one is healthy, the other unhealthy (186bc). Love encourages sophrosyne, or soundness of mind and character; He governs medicine, music, and astronomy, and even regulates hot and cold and wet and dry, which—when in balance—result in health (see: Humorism).

Throughout Eryximachus' speech, Aristophanes tries unsuccessfully to end his hiccoughing fit by holding his breath and gargling with water, until finally sneezing brought about by having his nose tickled with a feather ends the comic scene.

=== Aristophanes' speech ===
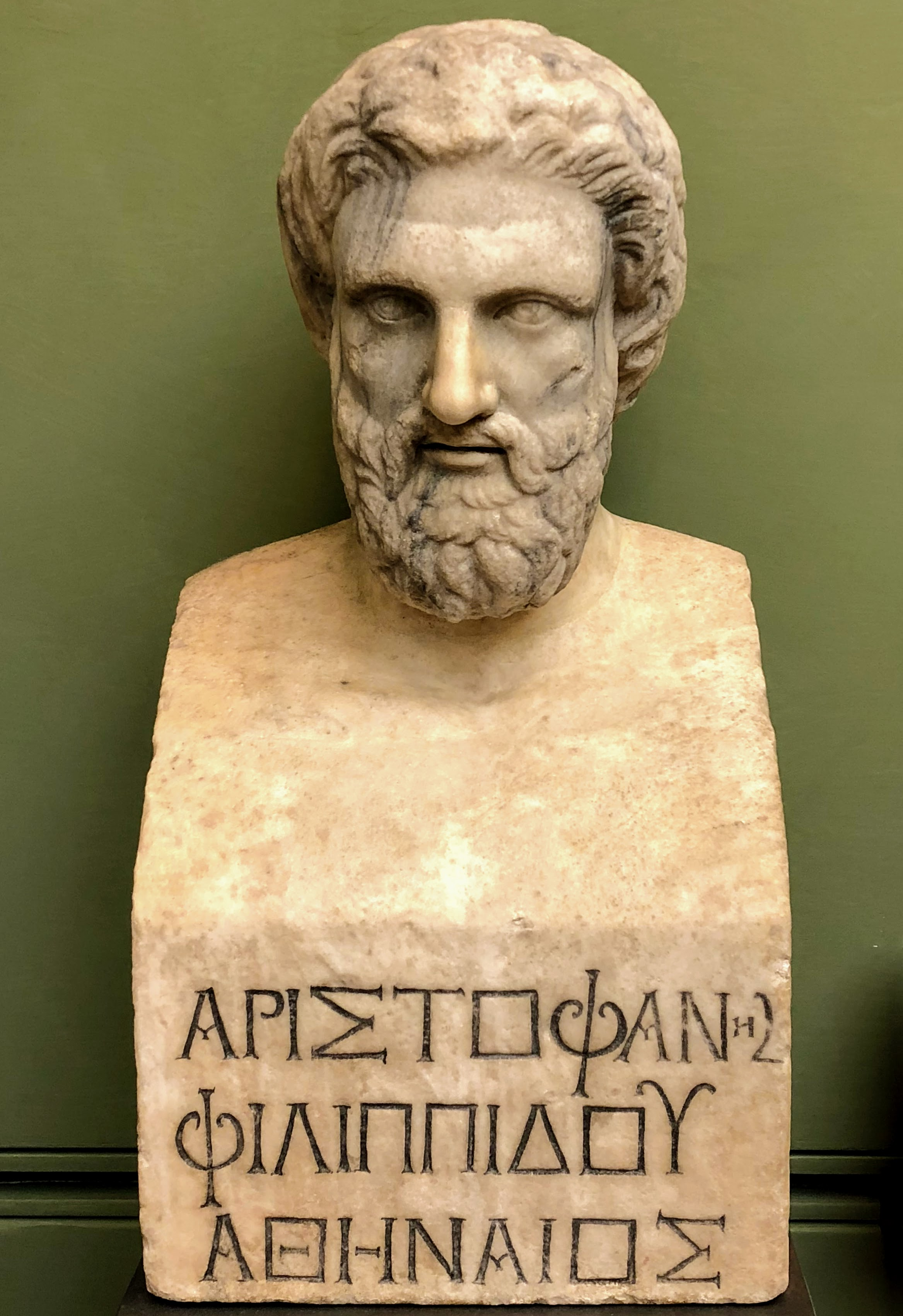
Aristophanes, who notoriously parodied Socrates in his comedy The Clouds, gives a possibly satirical speech on Eros at the symposium.

Before starting his speech, Aristophanes warns the group that his panegyric to love may be more absurd than funny. His speech gives an explanation of why people in love say they feel "whole" when they have found their love-partner. He begins by explaining that people must understand human nature before they can interpret the origins of love and how it affects their own times. This is, he says because in primal times people had doubled bodies, with faces and limbs turned away from one another. As spherical creatures who wheeled around like clowns doing cartwheels, these original people were very powerful. There were three sexes: male, female, and hermaphrodite; they were said to have descended from the Sun, the Earth and the Moon, respectively. These creatures tried to scale the heights of Olympus and planned to set upon the gods. Zeus thought about blasting them with thunderbolts, but, not wanting to deprive himself of their devotions and offerings, he decided to cripple them by chopping them in half, in effect separating each entity's two bodies.

Ever since that time, people run around saying they are looking for their other half because they are really trying to recover their primal nature. The women who were separated from women run after their own kind—whence lesbians. The men split from other men also run after their own kind and love being embraced by other men. Halves of hermaphroditic wholes are the men and women who engage in heterosexual love. Aristophanes says some people think homosexuals are shameless, but he praises their "confidence, courage and manliness": only homosexuals (the term here refers to men who are involved in pederastic love) "prove to be real men in politics", and many heterosexuals are adulterous and unfaithful. Aristophanes then claims that when two people who were separated from each other find each other, they never again want to be separated. This feeling is like a riddle, and cannot be explained. Aristophanes ends on a cautionary note. He says that men should fear the gods, and not neglect to worship them, lest they wield the ax again and we have to go about hopping on one leg, split apart once again.

The speech has become a focus of subsequent scholarly debate—it is seen sometimes as mere comic relief, and sometimes as satire: the creation myth Aristophanes puts forward to account for sexuality may be read as poking fun at the myths concerning the origins of humanity, numerous in classical Greek mythology.

=== Agathon's speech ===
Agathon complains that the previous speakers have made the mistake of congratulating mankind on the blessings of love, failing to give due praise to the god himself: Love, in fact, is the youngest of the gods and is an enemy of old age; Eros shuns the very sight of senility and clings to youth; he is dainty, tiptoeing through the flowers, never settling where there is no "bud to bloom". Agathon also implies that Love is the source of all human virtues: Wisdom, Justice, Courage, and Temperance. Although devoid of philosophical content, the speech Plato puts in the mouth of Agathon is a beautiful formal one, and Agathon contributes to the Platonic love theory with the idea that the object of love is beauty.

His speech may be regarded as self-consciously poetic and rhetorical, composed in the way of the sophists, gently mocked by Socrates.

=== Socrates' speech ===
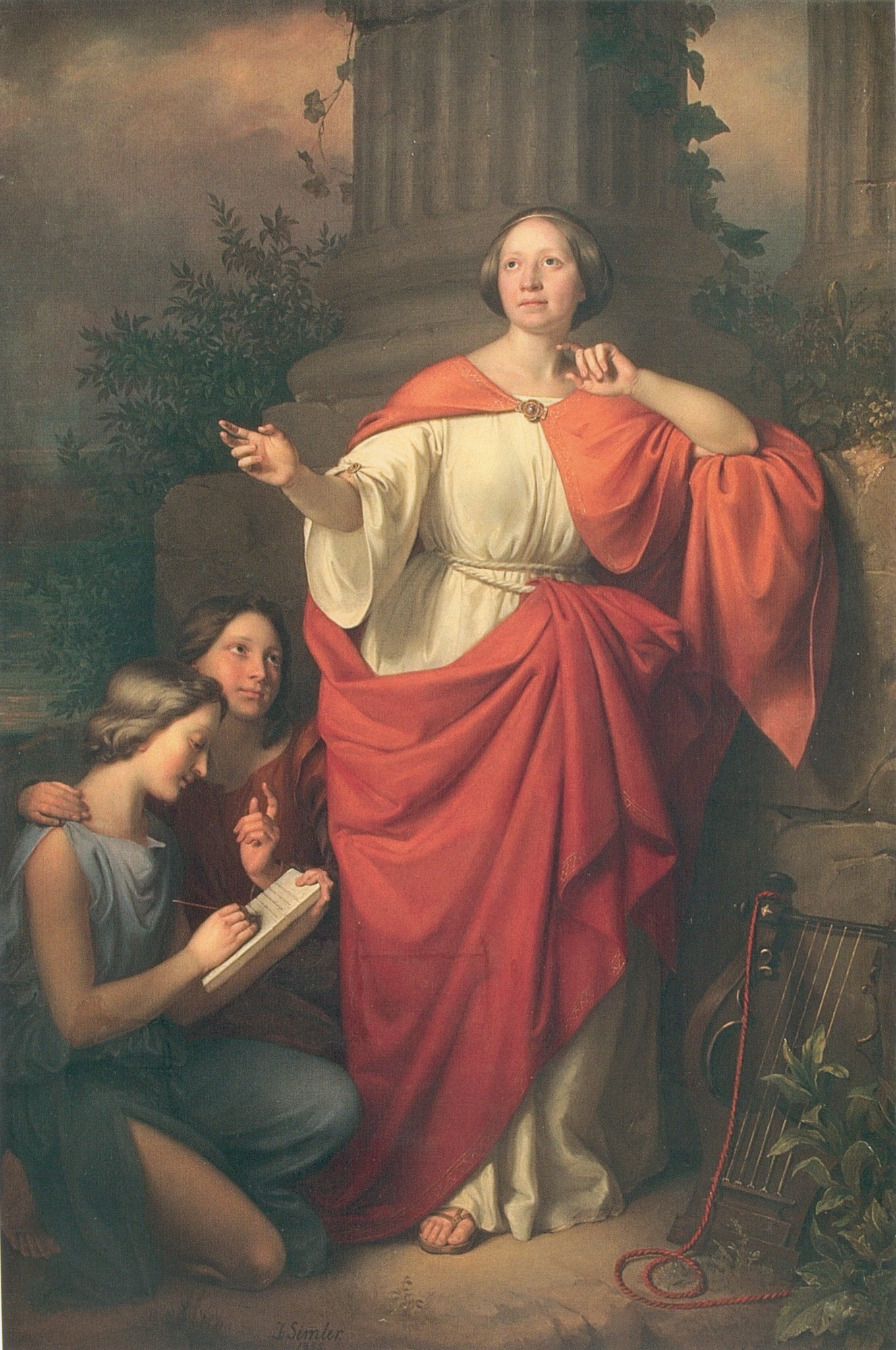
In the Symposium, Plato's Socrates attributes his view on love to Diotima, a priestess from Mantinea.

Before Socrates gives his speech he asks some questions of Agathon regarding the nature of love. Socrates then relates a story he was told by a wise woman called Diotima. According to her, Eros is not a god but is a spirit that mediates between humans and their objects of desire. Love itself is not wise or beautiful but is the desire for those things. Love is expressed through propagation and reproduction: either physical love or the exchanging and reproducing of ideas. The greatest knowledge, Diotima says, is knowledge of the "form of beauty", which humans must try to achieve. Here she attempts to rehabilitate pederastic desire by sublimating it into a higher, spiritual pursuit of Beauty in which the sexual appetite is ultimately transcended in contradiction with Pausanias's speech.

Socrates turns politely to Agathon and, after expressing admiration for his speech, asks whether he could examine his positions further. What follows is a series of questions and answers, typical of Plato's earlier dialogues, featuring Socrates' famous method of dialectics. First, he asks Agathon whether it is reasonable for someone to desire what they already have, like for example someone who is in perfect health to wish he were healthy. Agathon agrees with Socrates that this would be irrational, but is quickly reminded of his own definition of Love's true desires: youth and beauty. Putting the two together then, for Love to desire youth he must not have it himself, thus making him old, and for him to desire beauty, he himself must be ugly. Agathon has no choice but to agree.

After this exchange, Socrates switches to storytelling, a departure from the earlier dialogues where he is mostly heard refuting his opponent's arguments through dialectics. Socrates tells of a conversation he had with Diotima, who plays the same inquiring/instructing role that Socrates played with Agathon.

Diotima first explains that Love is neither a god, as was previously claimed by the other guests, nor a mortal but a daemon, a spirit halfway between god and man, who was born during a banquet thrown by the gods to celebrate the birth of Aphrodite. One of the guests was Porus, the god of resource or plenty, who was passed out from drinking too much nectar, and it so happened that another deity arrived, Penia, who came to the banquet to beg, and upon seeing Porus lying unconscious took the chance to sleep with him, conceiving a child in the process: Love. Having been conceived at Aphrodite's birthday party, he became her follower and servant, but through his real origins Love acquired a kind of double nature. From his mother, Love became poor, ugly, and with no place to sleep, while from his father he inherited the knowledge of beauty, as well as the cunningness to pursue it. Being of an intermediary nature, Love is also halfway between wisdom and ignorance, knowing just enough to understand his ignorance and try to overcome it. Beauty then is the perennial philosopher, the "lover of wisdom" (the Greek word "philia" being one of the four words for love).

After describing Love's origins, that provide clues to its nature, Diotima asks Socrates why is it, as he had previously agreed, that love is always that "of beautiful things". For if love affects everyone indiscriminately, then why is it that only some appear to pursue beauty throughout their lives? Socrates does not have the answer and so Diotima reveals it: Beauty is not the end but the means to something greater, the achievement of a certain reproduction and birth, the only claim that mortals can have on immortality. This is true for men as well as animals that seek an appropriate place to give birth, preferring to roam in pain until they find it. Some men are pregnant in body alone and, just like animals, enjoy the company of women with whom they can have children that will pass on their existence. Others are pregnant in both body and mind, and instead of children they carry wisdom, virtue, and above all, the art of civic order. Beauty is also their guide, but it will be towards the knowledge needed to accomplish their spiritual births.

In conclusion, Diotima gives Socrates a guide on how a man of this class should be brought up from a young age. First, he should start by loving a particular body he finds beautiful, but as time goes by, he will relax his passion and pass to the love of all bodies. From this point, he will pass to the love of beautiful minds, and then to that of knowledge. Finally, he will reach the ultimate goal, which is to witness beauty in itself, rather than representations, the true Form of Beauty in Platonic terms.

=== Alcibiades' speech ===
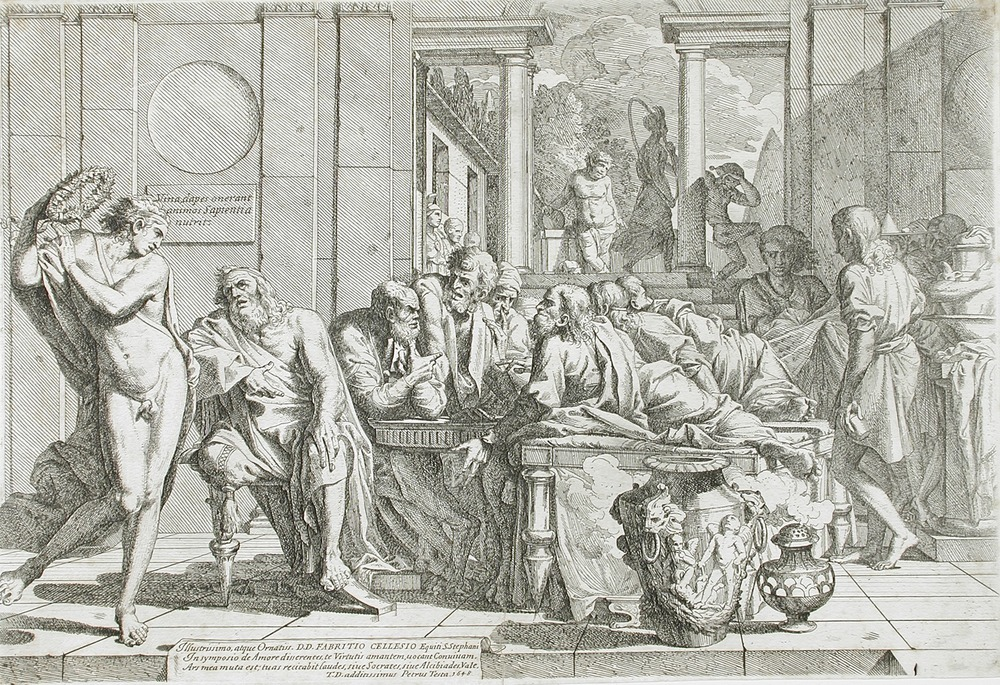
The Drunken Alcibiades Interrupting the Symposium (1648) by Pietro Testa. After the other six speeches have concluded, the drunken Alcibiades crashes the Symposium to give a speech.

When Socrates is nearly done, Alcibiades crashes in, terribly drunk, and delivers a panegyric to Socrates himself. No matter how hard he has tried, he says, he has never been able to seduce Socrates, because Socrates has no interest in physical pleasure. Despite this speech, Agathon lies down next to Socrates, much to Alcibiades' chagrin.

Like Agathon and Aristophanes, Alcibiades is a historical person from ancient Athens. A year after the events of the Symposium, his political enemies would drive him to flee Athens under fear of being sentenced to death for sacrilege and turn traitor to the Spartans. By his own admission, he is very handsome.

Finding himself seated on a couch with Socrates and Agathon, Alcibiades exclaims that Socrates, again, has managed to sit next to the most handsome man in the room. Socrates asks Agathon to protect him from the jealous rage of Alcibiades, asking Alcibiades to forgive him. Wondering why everyone seems sober, Alcibiades is informed of the night's agreement; after Socrates was ending his drunken ramblings, Alcibiades hopes that no one will believe a word Socrates was talking about, Alcibiades proposes to offer a panegyric to Socrates.

Alcibiades begins by comparing Socrates to a statue of Silenus; the statue is ugly and hollow, and inside it is full of tiny golden statues of the gods. Alcibiades then compares Socrates to a satyr. Satyrs were often portrayed with the sexual appetite, manners, and features of wild beasts, and often with a large erection. Alcibiades states that when he hears Socrates speak, he feels overwhelmed. The words of Socrates are the only ones to have ever upset him so deeply that his soul started to realize that his aristocratic life was no better than a slave's. Socrates is the only man who has ever made Alcibiades feel shame. Yet all this is the least of it—Alcibiades was intrigued to allow himself to follow Socrates. Most people, he continues, do not know what Socrates is like on the inside:

But once I caught him when he was open like Silenus' statues, and I had a glimpse of the figures he keeps hidden within: they were so godlike—so bright and beautiful, so utterly amazing—that I no longer had a choice. I just had to do whatever he told me.

— Symposium 216e–217a

He was deeply curious towards Socrates' intelligence and wisdom, but Alcibiades really wanted him sexually at the time that Socrates, a man that gave only Platonic love to everyone he has encountered, gave up teaching everything he knew towards Alcibiades because of his pride, lust, and immoral conduct upon him. Yet Socrates made no move, and Alcibiades began to pursue Socrates "as if I were the lover and he my young prey!" When Socrates continually rebuffed him, Alcibiades began to fantasize a view towards Socrates as the only true and worthy lover he had ever had. So he told Socrates that it seemed to him now that nothing could be more important than becoming the best man he could be, and Socrates was best fit to help him reach that aim. Socrates responded that if he did have this power, why would he exchange his true (inner) beauty for the image of beauty that Alcibiades would provide. Furthermore, Alcibiades was wrong and Socrates knows there is no use in him. Alcibiades spent the night sleeping beside Socrates yet, in his deep humiliation, Alcibiades made no sexual attempt.

In his speech, Alcibiades goes on to describe Socrates' virtues, his incomparable valour in battle, his immunity to cold or fear. On one occasion he even saved Alcibiades' life and then refused to accept honours for it. Socrates, he concludes, is unique in his ideas and accomplishments, unrivaled by any man from the past or present.

=== Conclusion ===
The party becomes wild and drunken, with the symposium coming to an end. Many of the main characters take the opportunity to depart and return home. Aristodemus goes to sleep. When he wakes up the next morning and prepares to leave the house, Socrates is still awake, proclaiming to Agathon and Aristophanes that a skillful playwright should be able to write comedy as well as tragedy. When Agathon and Aristophanes fall asleep, Socrates rises up and walks to the Lyceum to wash and tend to his daily business as usual, not going home to sleep until that evening.

== Interpretations and themes ==
Andrew Dalby considers the opening pages of the Symposium the best depiction in any ancient Greek source of the way texts are transmitted by oral tradition without writing. It shows how an oral text may have no simple origin, and how it can be passed along by repeated tellings, and by different narrators, and how it can be sometimes verified, and sometimes corrupted. The story of the symposium is being told by Apollodorus to his friend. Apollodorus was not himself at the banquet, but heard the story from Aristodemus, a man who was there. Also, Apollodorus was able to confirm parts of the story with Socrates himself, who was one of the speakers at the banquet. In addition, the story that Socrates narrates when it is his turn to speak was told to Socrates by Diotima.

Martha Nussbaum considers the possibility that the Symposium is intended to criticize Socrates and his philosophy, and to reject certain aspects of his behavior, and that Plato intends to portray Socratic philosophy as something that has lost touch with the actual individual as it devoted itself to abstract principles.

James Arieti considers that the Symposium resembles a drama, with emotional and dramatic events occurring especially when Alcibiades crashes the banquet. Arieti suggests that it should be studied more as a drama, with a focus on character and actions, and less as an exploration of philosophical ideas. This suggests that the characters speak, as in a play, not as the author, but as themselves. This theory, Arieti has found, reveals how much each of the speakers of the Symposium resembles the god, Eros, that they each are describing. It may be Plato's point to suggest that when humankind talks about god, they are drawn towards creating that god in their own image.

Walter Hamilton remarks that Plato takes care to portray Alcibiades and Socrates and their relationship in a way that makes it clear that Socrates had not been a bad influence on Alcibiades. Plato does this to free his teacher from the guilt of corrupting the minds of prominent youths, which had, in fact, earned Socrates the death sentence in 399 BC.

Aristophanes' comedy, The Frogs (405 BC), attacks the new tragedy of Agathon and Euripides, and opposes it to the old tragedy of Aeschylus. In The Frogs, Dionysus, the god of theatre and wine, descends into Hades and observes a heated dispute between Aeschylus and Euripides over who is the best in tragedy. Dionysus is engaged to be the judge, and decides the outcome, not based on the merits of the two tragedians, but based on their political stance regarding the political figure, Alcibiades. Since Aeschylus prefers Alcibiades, Dionysus declares Aeschylus the winner. That contest provides the basic structure on which the Symposium is modeled as a kind of sequel: In the Symposium, Agathon has just celebrated a victory the day before and is now hosting another kind of debate, this time it is between a tragedian, a comic poet, and Socrates. At the beginning of the Symposium, Agathon asserts that "Dionysus will be the judge", and Dionysus is, though Alcibiades performs as a surrogate for the god. So the character, Alcibiades, who was the deciding factor in the debate in The Frogs, becomes the judge in the Symposium, and he now rules in favor of Socrates, who had been attacked by Aristophanes in The Clouds. The Symposium is a response to The Frogs, and shows Socrates winning not only over Aristophanes, who was the author of both The Frogs, and The Clouds, but also over the tragic poet who was portrayed in that comedy as the victor.

== Reception ==
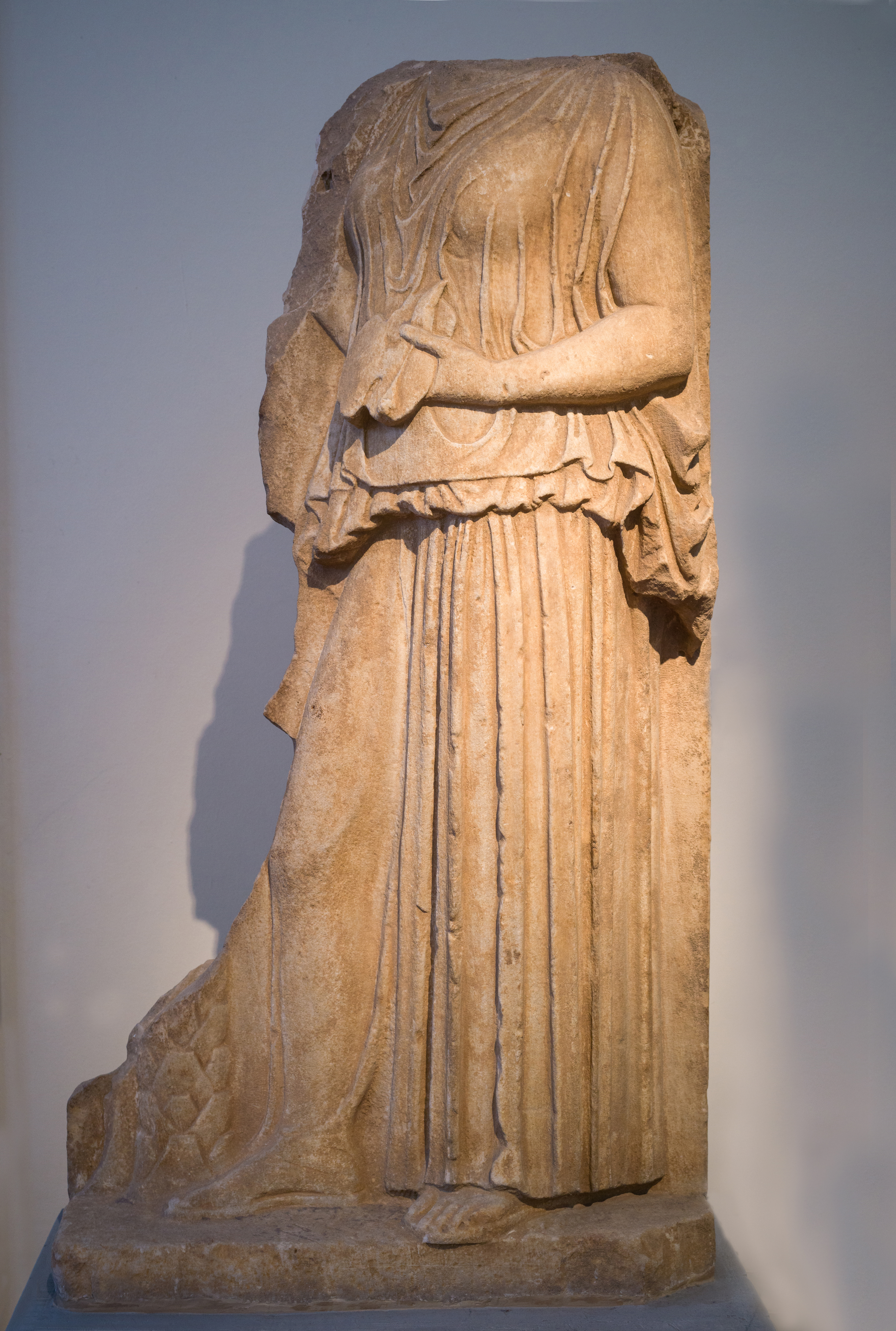
Votive relief (c. 420 BC) of a woman holding the liver of a sacrificial victim, probably Diotima of Mantineia

The symposium is considered one of Plato's most important dialogues and is one of the most intensively received. It has had a strong impact both in antiquity and in modern times and is one of the most famous works in world literature.

=== Ancient ===
In ancient times, the Symposium was read eagerly. From a formal point of view, it became a classic model for the genre of ancient symposia literature. However, later authors did not try to compete with Plato's philosophical depth, but created more loosened up, more entertaining representations, for a wider audience.

==== Classical and Hellenistic period ====
Xenophon, a contemporary of Plato, also wrote a Symposium, which is generally considered to have postdated Plato's work and was modeled after it. For example, in Xenophon's Symposium, Socrates is also a participant in the banquet and gives a speech about Eros.

In his Politics, Aristotle quoted from the speech of Aristophanes in the Symposium.

The Cynic philosopher Bion of Borysthenes (4th–3rd century BC) said that Socrates was a fool if he had sexually desired Alcibiades but had suppressed the drive.

The Epicureans condemned Plato's linking of eroticism with virtue (Arete). According to the Epicurean doctrine, passionate love is highly harmful; the erotic drive is considered a great evil.

==== Roman Empire ====
During the reign of Tiberius in the first century AD, the court astrologer Thrasyllus of Mendes created an influential edition of the works of Plato, where he included the Symposium in his third tetralogy along with the Parmenides, the Philebus, and the Phaedrus. He also gave it the alternate title On the Good, and categorized it as an "ethical" writing.

In the first century AD, the Hellenistic Jewish scholar Philo of Alexandria, criticized the homoerotic aspects of the dialogue, claiming that the theme was primarily "general and vulgar love" between men or between men and boys, whose moral and social effects were devastating. This criticism was probably not devised by Philo, but taken from an older antiplatonic script.

The unknown Middle Platonist author of the commentary on the Theaetetus, which is still partially extant, mentioned in the surviving part of his work that he had previously written a commentary on the Symposium. The lifetime of this Platonist is disputed; the assumptions vary between the 1st century BC and the 2nd century AD.

In his treatise on Isis and Osiris the historian and Platonist philosopher Plutarch offered an allegorical interpretation of Diotima's Eros myth: Eros, who represents the visible world, is born from the combination of a perfect father (Poros), who represents the Platonic world of ideas, with the needy mother (Penia), who is equated with matter. Plutarch's dialogue Amatorius contains numerous reminiscences of the Symposium. In his Table-talk (Quaestiones convivales), Plato's dialogue is clearly recognisable as a model.

The Middle Platonist Lucius Calvenus Taurus taught the Symposium in his philosophy lectures. As his student Aulus Gellius reports, Taurus expressed indignant views about ignorant beginners who wanted to read the dialogue because of the performance of the drunken Alcibiades, instead of being interested in the philosophical content. The role of the Alcibiades apparently rather attracted attention in philosophical circles of the time. This audience wanted to have fun and regarded Plato's work as entertainment. Tauros emphasized – as is customary in Platonism – one should pay more attention to the content than to the form, but he also pointed out with pride in the rhetorical brilliance in Pausanias' speech; no rhetoric had created such excellent prose as Plato. A passage from this speech particularly impressed Gellius himself, who translated a passage from into Latin and memorized it. He saw it as a pattern of the highest stylistic elegance, which he wanted to recreate in his Latin mother tongue to train his own eloquence.

The satirist Lucian of Samosata wrote a Symposium in which he offered a parodic reversal of Plato's concept. As with Plato, Lucian's philosophers hold a banquet, but instead of a meeting with spiritual competition at a high level, there are desolate scenes, the philosophers' claim to virtue proves to be hypocrisy. Aelius Aristides emphasized the fictional character of the Platonic dialogues, and pointed to disagreements that he had encountered in the review of individual statements by Plato in Symposium on the basis of historical facts. In his Deipnosophistae, Athenaeus criticized the Symposium in the context of his polemic against Plato. He described the dialogue as an empty chatter and claimed that the presentation of Socrates’ military achievements was false, because it did not agree with the reports of other sources, and that report on the night in which Alcibiades wanted to seduce Socrates also could not be true.

==== Late antiquity ====
In late antiquity, Neoplatonism was the predominant philosophical system. Plotinus (d. 270), the founder of Neoplatonism, discusses Diotima's concept of Eros in his treatise On Beauty. In his writing On Eros, he interpreted the myth of the origin of Eros allegorically, but he rejected Plutarch's equation of Eros with the visible world. Porphyry of Tyre (died 301/305), one of Plotinus' students, tells a story of how Plotinus had attended a public speech by the orator Diophanes, who had defended the behaviour of Alcibiades in the Symposium and stressed the erotic aspect of the relationship between Socrates and Alcibiades, arguing that a philosophy pupil should be prepared to engage in a sexual relationship with his teacher. As a Platonist teacher of philosophy, Plotinus took offense to this portrayal and commissioned Porphyry to write a response that would be presented to the same audience as Diophanes' speech.

The later Neoplatonist Iamblichus (d. around 320/325) taught the Symposium in lessons in his philosophical school for advanced philosophy students, considering it to embody the highest grade in his system of virtues, "contemplative" virtue. He also included the Symposium in his curriculum of the twelve most significant dialogues of Neoplatonism, assigning the Symposium to the "theological" group of dialogues. At the New Academy in Athens, which was founded in the 5th century CE based on the curriculum of Iamblichus, Proclus wrote a commentary on Diotima's remarks in the Symposium, but very little is known about the content of this commentary, as only fragments have survived.

=== Medieval ===
During the Middle Ages, scholars from Western Europe had no access to the text of dialogue. In the Byzantine Empire, on the other hand, the symposium was known; a number of Byzantine manuscripts, some of which are partly provided with scholia, testify to the interest of educated circles in the dialogue. The oldest surviving medieval symposium manuscript originated in one of these; Arethas of Caesarea from the circle of Photios in 895.[92] In the 14th century, the philosopher George Pachymeres made a copy written in his own hand. The extant medieval textual tradition consists of 55 manuscripts which contain the symposium in whole or in part.

In the medieval Islamic world, there is no evidence of any translation of the Symposium, as no direct quotations that purport to be from the dialogue have survived. However, at least parts of the dialogue seem to have been known, including the spherical-man myth, which was widely transmitted in a modified form. A fragment of the lost work entitled The Conformity of Philosophers on the Allegories of Love by the 9th century philosopher al-Kindi seems to contain a relatively detailed summary of Plato's dialogue.

=== Renaissance ===
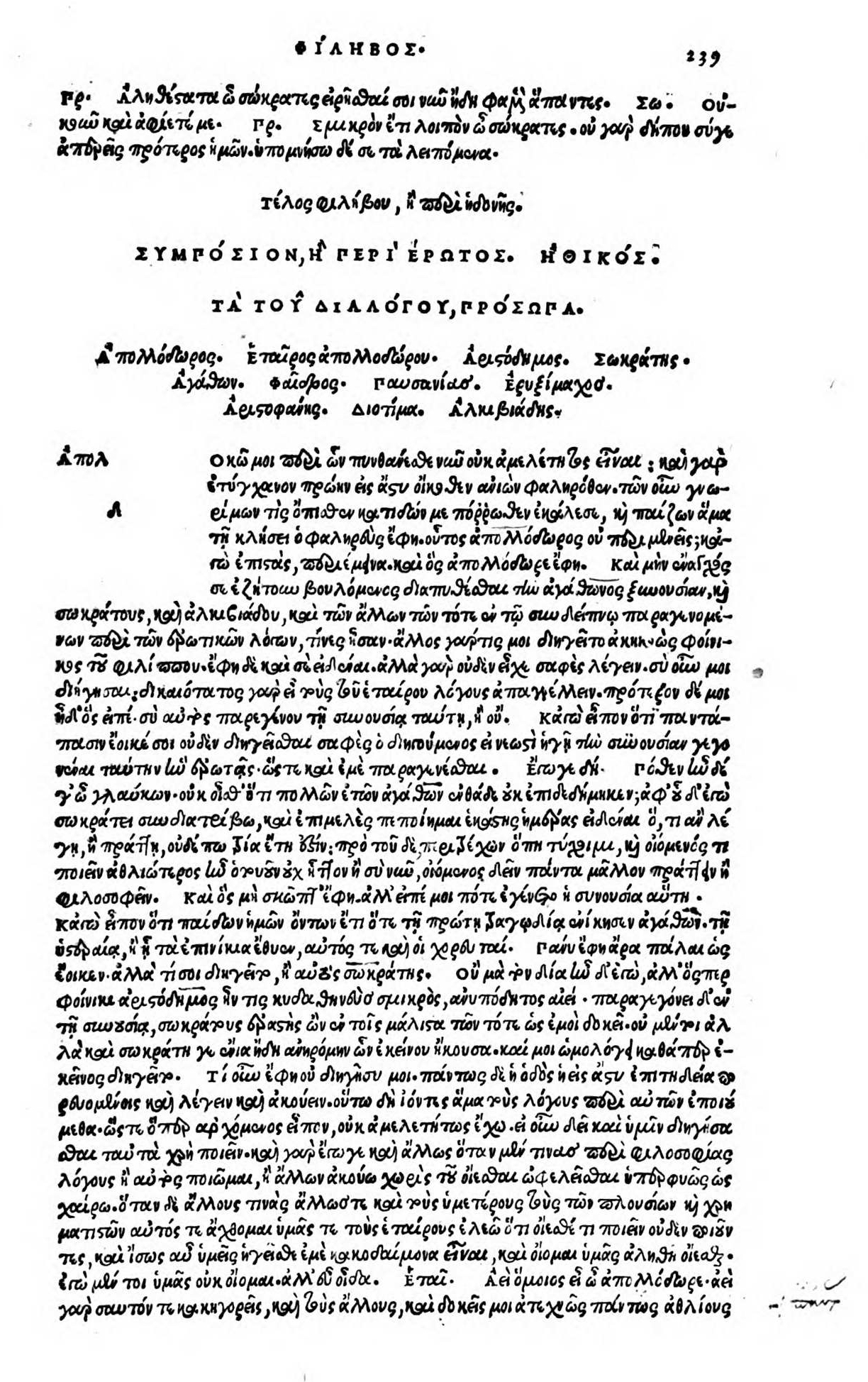
The first edition of the Greek text, Venice 1513

In the West, the Symposium was rediscovered in the age of Renaissance humanism. The Italian humanist and statesman Leonardo Bruni made an incomplete translation into Latin in 1435, which he sent to Cosimo de' Medici. The first edition of the Greek text was published in Venice in September 1513 by Aldus Manutius as part of the first complete edition of Plato's works. The editor was Markos Musuros. The arrangement that Musuros gave to the text remained the standard for centuries.

The strongly anti-Platonist humanist George of Trebizond castigated the homoeroticism in Plato's works, the "socratic vice", in his fighting writing Comparatio philosophorum Plato et Aristotelis. In the Symposium he found a point of attack in Aristophanes' speech, whose erotic concept he interpreted as an affirmation of the satisfaction of sexual greed. The Platonist Bessarion responded to this challenge with a vehement response, the publication of Against Plato's Slanderers in 1469. Bessarion accused Trebizond, among other things, of having equated the views of the various speakers in the symposium with Plato's own position. He sought to show the conformity of the Platonic concept of love with the Christian one. This line of argumentation was groundbreaking for Renaissance Platonism.

Marsilio Ficino, an active explorer of ancient Platonism, translated the Symposium into Latin. He published the Latin text in Florence in the complete edition of his Plato translations in 1484, making the dialogue accessible to a wider reading audience. He also wrote a Latin commentary (Commentarium in convivium Platonis de amore, usually called De amore – About Love –) which was also printed in 1484. He gave the comment the figure of a dialogue: a group of scholars gathered in Ficino's villa for a banquet and listens to a reading of the symposium after the meal, then they lay out the speeches about Eros. When commenting on Diotima's teachings, Ficino followed the interpretation of Plotinus. He grabbed Poros as a divine ray of light, Penia as darkness. He also adopted the distinction between heavenly and profane love introduced by Plato's Pausanias. He considered the latter (amor vulgaris) to be a disease. He saw in the Eros concepts of all the speeches of the Symposium aspects of the same Platonic doctrine of love. Ficino also made an Italian (Tuscanian) version of De amore entitled El libro dell’amore, with whom he addressed a broad lay audience. His Symposium commentary contributed significantly to establishing Plato's reputation as the leading theoretician of love. The popular version became the prototype of a series of treatises called love trails (trattati d’amore). The poet Girolamo Benivieni summarized the main ideas of Ficino's Symposium commentary in his poem about love. The humanist Giovanni Pico della Mirandola wrote a commentary on Benivieni's poem in 1486. There he expressed his own understanding of Platonic love.

In 1535, the Dialogues on Love by the Jewish philosopher Judah Leon Abravanel, who was one of the most renowned representatives of Renaissance Platonism, picked up on Plato's art of dialogue in a literary way, but was also strongly influenced by the discussions in the Symposium. His writing was one of the most important formative factors in love literature of the 16th century.

In France, Queen Margaret of Navarre translated Ficino's commentary into French. The publication of this translation in 1546 gave an important impulse to the reception of the ideas described in the symposium in French poetry. Margaret, who was a poet herself, combined Platonic and Christian elements in her understanding of love. In her epic Les prisons she described an ascent from earthly to divine love. In doing so, she assumed that Diotima's myth of the origin of Eros was familiar with to her readers. Margaret's circle included the poet Antoine Héroet, who addressed the myth of the spherical man in his very popular poem L'Androgyne de Plato, printed in 1542.

In the late 16th Century, the philosopher Francesco Patrizi da Cherso wrote L’amorosa filosofia, which imitated the structure of the symposium: the dialogue takes place at a banquet, in which a story is told about a conversation with a woman, in this case the poet Tarquinia Molza, a friend of Patrizi. However, the dialogue also presented unplatonic ideas; it traced all forms of love to a natural drive to self-love. In doing so, Patrizi turned against the tendency to polarize love into a good spiritual and a bad sensual way in the contemporary discourse of love.

=== Modern ===
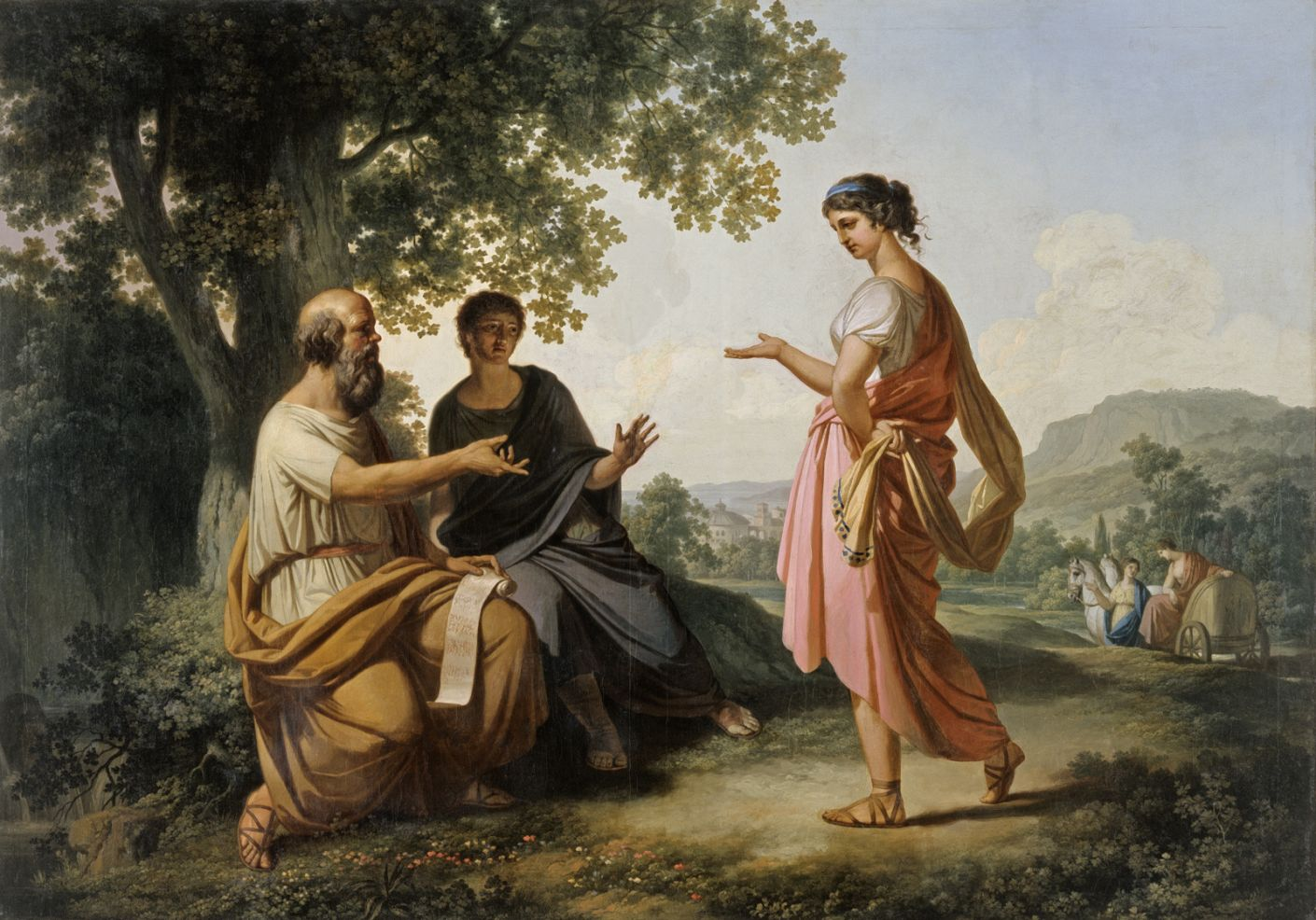
Socrates with a Disciple and Diotima, by Franz Caucig (1820)

The poet Percy Bysshe Shelley was fascinated by the Symposium, and considered it Plato's most beautiful work. In the summer of 1818 he translated it into English, allowing himself a free translation of the Greek text for style.

In 1845, Søren Kierkegaard published the book Stages on Life's Way, whose first part, entitled In vino veritas, represents a counterpart to Plato's symposium. Kierkegaard constructed his text almost parallel to the ancient model, with a banquet and a succession of speeches about love.

In the late 19th and early 20th century, a group of English-speaking poets called themselves the "Uranians", referring to the representation of the "Uranian" eroticism in Pausanias' speech in the Symposium. One theorist of this movement was Edward Perry Warren, who published the novel A Tale of Pausanian Love under the pseudonym Arthur Lyon Raile in 1927 and the three-volume work A Defence of Uranian Love in 1928–1930. Plato's dialogue also plays a role in the novel Maurice by E.M. Forster, written in 1913–1914 and published posthumously only in 1971, Plato's dialogue plays a role in the context of a modern homoerotic relationship. Forster had received the suggestion for the novel from the writer Edward Carpenter, who professed the ideal of an "Uranian" love.

In his Beyond the Pleasure Principle (1920), Sigmund Freud cited the spherical-man myth as proof that his theory of the conservative nature of desire had already had a precursor in antiquity. The representation of the Aristophanes in the Symposium is indeed a "hypothesis" of "fantastic kind", but agree in the basic idea with the acceptance of the regressive character of desire: "It derives a drive from the need for the restoration of an earlier state." The erotic ascent described in the Symposium has variously been compared with the sublimation in the sense of Freud's psychoanalysis and has been interpreted as a sublimation process, since it leads away from sexual enforcement. However, there are fundamental differences: in sublimation, the libido is suppressed. It is first blocked as a sexual desire and then redirected to other objects, with the substitute objects being less attractive to the subject than the original goal of libido. Even after sublimation, the pursuit of its nature remains sexual. For Plato's Diotima, on the other hand, the ascent never implies a blockage of the erotic impulse, and the forms of eroticism that replace sexual satisfaction are more attractive than these. The Platonic ascent is a consciously accomplished sequence of steps, the sublimation of an unconscious process.

Simone Weil interpreted the spherical-man myth in her 1951 publication Intuitions prérétiennes. She considered the state of duality, the separation of subject and object, to be the misfortune of humanity, and said that the division of spherical people was "only a visible picture of this state of duality, which is our essential lack". To strive for unity as "the state in which subject and object are one and the same, the state of those who recognize himself and love himself". This goal can be achieved through "alignment with God".

In 1959, Leo Strauss interpreted the Symposium as a presentation of an examination of the question of whether philosophy or poetry represented the way to wisdom. It is a competition in which Socrates overcome the poets Agathon and Aristophanes, thus showing the reader the superiority of philosophy. This is done in the field of eroticism, a traditional domain of the poets. Thus, the primacy of reason is established over irrational factors. The symposium is the least political among the dialogues of Plato; it is "the natural", human nature, but also the basis of social and political action.

Jacques Lacan dealt intensively with Plato's dialogue. He was particularly preoccupied with the relationship between Socrates and Alkibiades, which he looked at from the psychoanalytical point of view of the transmission of affects from one object to another. He asked about the goal of the desire of the Alcibiades. He had transferred his erotic desire, which Agathon actually had been granted, to Socrates, hoping for a counter-transfer, but had refused Socrates. Socrates was in a situation that the psychoanalyst corresponded. In his treatise The Four Basic Concepts of Psychoanalysis (1964), Lacan stated that the transmission was articulated in the symposium "in a perfect and strictest form". There Plato had gone further than anywhere else in an attempt to show the reader the coming lines of his dialogues. This gave him the most precise way, he displayed the position of the transfer. From this point of view, Lacan had already dealt in depth with the symposium in his "achten seminar", a lecture held in Paris in 1960/1961, which was dedicated to the phenomenon of transmission. He also investigated the state of defect described in the spherical-man myth and the illusionary search of man for his lost half.

In 1984, Michel Foucault, in his History of Sexuality, emphasized the contrast between the conventional and the Platonic understanding of love. For Plato, true love is characterized by the fact that it is related to the truth through the appearances of the object. Thus the love relationship as a relationship to truth is structured. As Foucault points out in more detail, such a love affair differs from a conventional one by the appearance of a new person, the master. He is the one who reflects on himself as a subject of desire, who has the greatest knowledge in love and is therefore the master of truth and teaches the beloved about love. In the conventional game of love, an active lover courts and wins a passive lover for himself; the lover is always the elder of the two, the beloved, the physically more attractive. In Plato, on the other hand, the master of love, an experienced man, becomes an object of love for younger people who far surpass him in physical attractiveness. His power over himself is fascinated and gives him power over others.

== Editions and translations ==
- Project Gutenberg: Symposium by Plato, trans. by Benjamin Jowett
- Perseus Project Sym.172a English translation by Harold N. Fowler linked to commentary by R. G. Bury and others
- Plato, The Symposium, trans. by W. Hamilton. Harmondsworth: Penguin, 1951.
- Plato, The Symposium, Greek text with commentary by Kenneth Dover. Cambridge: Cambridge University Press, 1980. ISBN 0521295238.
- Plato, The Symposium, Greek text with trans. by Tom Griffith. Berkeley: University of California Press, 1989. ISBN 0520066952.
- Plato, The Symposium, trans. with commentary by R. E. Allen. New Haven: Yale University Press, 1993. ISBN 0300056990.
- Plato, The Symposium, trans. by Christopher Gill. London: Penguin, 2003. ISBN 0140449272.
- Plato, The Symposium, trans. by Alexander Nehamas and Paul Woodruff (from Plato: Complete Works, ed. by John M. Cooper, pp. 457–506. ISBN 0872203492); available separately: ISBN 0872200760.
- Plato, The Symposium, trans. by Robin Waterfield. Oxford: Oxford University Press, 1998. ISBN 0192834274.
- Plato, The Symposium, trans. by Avi Sharon. Newburyport, MA: Focus Publishing, 1998. ISBN 0941051560.
- Plato, The Symposium, trans. by Seth Benardete with essays by Seth Benardete and Allan Bloom. Chicago: University of Chicago Press, 2001. ISBN 0226042758.
- Plato, The Symposium, trans. by M. C. Howatson edited by Frisbee C. C. Sheffield, Cambridge University Press, 2008, ISBN 978-0521682985

== See also ==
- Erik Satie's Socrate
- "The Origin of Love", a song from Hedwig and the Angry Inch
- Bernstein's Serenade after "Symposium"
- Stages on Life's Way, an 1845 book which includes In Vino Veritas, Søren Kierkegaard's dialogue on love based on Symposium
- Eulogy
- Encomium

== Notes ==
References to the dialogue are given in Stephanus pagination
