= Anonymous Commentary on Plato's Theaetetus =

Anonymous commentary on a work of Plato

Anonymous Theaetetus
- Egyptian Museum of Berlin
- Also known as: P.Berol 9782
- Type: Papyrus roll, 78 columns, 44 lines per column
- Date: c. 2nd century CE, from an original dating no earlier than the 1st century BC
- Place of origin: Hermopolis
- Language: Ancient Greek
- Script: Uncial, Greek alphabet
- Contents: Commentary on Plato's Theaetetus
- Previously kept: Cairo Museum
- Discovered: Found in the ruins of a house along with P.Berol 9780. Purchased by Ludwig Borchardt in 1901
- Accession: 02729

The Anonymous Commentary on Plato's Theaetetus is a partially extant Ancient Greek philosophical commentary from the early Roman era that contains an exposition on Plato's Theaetetus. The composition of the text has been dated to some time between the late 1st century BCE through the middle of the 2nd century CE, making it one of the few surviving historical examples of Middle Platonist literature.

In the surviving portion of the commentary, the anonymous commentator discusses major themes of Plato's theories of knowledge such as Definitions of knowledge, Justified true belief, and the Problem of the criterion, and compares the account of knowledge in the Theaetetus to the Meno, Protagoras and the Sophist (dialogue). In addition, the commentator provides a summary of other interpretations of the dialogue during his time and presents a number of arguments against rival philosophical schools, especially Stoicism, Academic skepticism, and Pyrrhonism. The commentator also provides an in-depth analysis of the mathematical proof given by Theodorus of Cyrene and adds background historical detail on many of the people in the story and speculations on Plato's intentions in composition of the work.

The commentary was lost along with the majority of Commentaries on Plato and did not survive to the Medieval era in any known manuscript tradition. It was entirely unknown until the chance discovery in 1901 of a single papyrus roll dating to the middle of the 2nd century CE. The very beginning of the work is missing and the work cuts off partway through the dialogue. Its publication in 1905 attracted little interest at the time, as the commentators were not seen as original philosophers by classical scholarship of the time. In the second half of the 20th century, however, renewed interest in Ancient Roman philosophy and the philosophy of the ancient commentators has elevated it to one of the most important primary sources documenting the historical developments of Platonism and the commentary tradition in the early centuries of the Roman Empire.

== Style, dating and authorship ==
=== Style ===
In addition to original philosophical works, many philosophers in antiquity wrote commentaries, most commonly on the works of other philosophers such as Plato and Aristotle, but also interpretive commentaries on religious or literary texts. Rather than simply reviewing or summarizing a philosophical or religious text, these works went through a line-by-line, highlighting specific passages and providing background or expositions. Many philosophical commentaries were intended as school notes, that expanded on the details of a philosophical work for students and clarified the meanings of obscure words, while others were more complex expositions and interpretations that were intended for a more advanced audience within a philosophical school. The Theaetetus commentary contains elements of both kinds of commentary.

The Anonymous Theaetetus commentary is the earliest surviving commentary on a work of Plato. Philosophical commentaries had been written long prior, the earliest evidence of any philosophical commentary is on the works of Homer, and one of the earliest surviving philosophical commentaries on any type of work is the Derveni papyrus, a 4th-century BCE papyrus that contains an allegorical philosophical commentary on an Orphic cosmogony that dates to the middle of the 5th century BCE. The first known commentary on a work of Plato specifically was written in the third century BCE by Crantor of Soli, the last scholarch of the Old Academy, which has been lost, but many later works written by Neoplatonists from the 3rd through 6th centuries CE have been preserved.

=== Dating ===
The commentary is generally believed to date from 45 BCE to 150 CE, although attempts to establish a more exact dating have proven contentious. The fragmentary nature of the work make questions of the date and authorship of the work difficult to answer more exactly, as few other philosophical works from the period have survived. Based on its content, the commentary must date from the 1st century BCE or later; as a work of Middle Platonism that ascribes positive doctrines to Plato and disputes the Academic Skepticism that was dominant in the Hellenistic period and synthesizes the doctrines of the Stoics. The commentary must also have been written at the latest in the first half of the second century CE, when the papyrus that the surviving copy of the text has been dated to.

=== Authorship ===
Although no part of the work survives which would allow a definitive identification of its author, the author can be identified as a Middle Platonist on the basis of doctrinal content within the text. The Middle Platonists, beginning with Antiochus of Ascalon, had rejected the skepticism of the Platonic Academy that had been dominant in Hellenistic philosophy, advocating a more dogmatic form of Platonism. Many Middle Platonists attempted to synthesize Platonic doctrines with either Stoicism or Aristotelianism; Antiochus had preferred the Stoics, while the Anonymous Commentator prefers Aristotle while criticizing the Stoics.

There have been attempts to identify the author with known Middle Platonists; John M. Dillon, seeing a similarity with the School of Gaius the Platonist, identifies him with the mid 2nd century CE philosopher Albinus, while Harold Tarrant says the best known candidate is the much earlier Eudorus of Alexandria, in the late 1st century BCE.

== Content ==
The commentary is on Plato's Theaetetus, one of his major works of epistemology. In the dialogue, Socrates and an Athenian youth named Theaetetus, investigate the nature of knowledge (episteme). Like many of the characters in Plato's dialogues, Theaetetus is a historical figure who is known to us independently of Plato. Both Theaetetus and his mentor, Theodorus of Cyrene were Ancient Greek mathematicians who are known through citation of their work in theorems proved in Euclid's Elements by later mathematicians. After a more general discussion of knowledge and understanding where they work through a mathematics problem Socrates and Theaetetus then discuss three potential definitions - knowledge as perception, knowledge as true belief (pistis), and knowledge as "justified true belief," although the dialogue ultimately ends in aporia as this definition, too, is shown to be unsatisfactory.

The commentary is only partially preserved, starting in the middle of the introduction to the commentary itself and cutting off partway through. The extant portion covers only the beginning 15% of the dialogue which begins its coverage of the Theaetetus at the end of the prelude, a brief frame story. In this portion of the Theaetetus covered by the dialogue, Socrates asks Theodorus if he has any promising geometry students, and Theodorus introduces him to Theaetetus. Socrates challenges Theaetetus to explain to him the nature of knowledge, and they proceed to discuss the difference between knowledge and wisdom and the differences between examples of knowledge and knowledge itself. Theaetetus gives an example of a mathematical proof, and Socrates explains his philosophical method for bringing out ideas, which he compares to midwifery (Maieutics). Socrates and Theaetetus then begin to discuss knowledge gained from sense-perception and examine Protagoras' famous maxim "Man is the measure of all things," and Heraclitus' theory of flux, although the commentary cuts off partway through this discussion. The commentator follows along the dialogue, adding explication of the readings of certain parts of the dialogue, giving cultural or historical background, and occasionally going into in-depth explication of certain philosophical arguments.

=== Introduction ===
Most ancient commentaries on Plato and Aristotle begin with an introductory preface explaining the work being commented on. However, the first column of text from the papyrus this commentary is very fragmentary, rendering it unreadable, so the surviving portion of the text begins in the middle of this introduction. The surviving text opens at the end of an explanation of the purpose (skopos) of the Theaetetus dialogue, which the commentator claims is catharsis against the relativist doctrine of Protagoras, a Sophist from the 5th century BCE who taught that "Man is the measure of all things" and whose work On Truth the commentator claims Theaetetus had recently read. The commentator then states that some other Platonists believe that the purpose of the dialogue is to outline the Problem of the criterion, to give an argument in the Theaetetus about what knowledge is not (i.e. sense perception) in order to follow it up in the Sophist, with what knowledge is (i.e. the forms). However, the commentator says that these people are mistaken, and that the true purpose of the dialogue is to explain what the essence (ousia) of knowledge is.

The commentator then discusses the content of the prologue, which relates a frame story in which the dialogue between Theaetetus and Socrates is being recounted from a book by Euclid of Megara, a Socratic philosopher who founded the Megarian school. The commentator interprets the prologue as a propaedeutic demonstration of practical ethics; Euclid, as a distinguished Socratic philosopher, is being used as a model for how one ought to behave. This is in opposition to the Stoic doctrine of kathekon, which taught that "proper function" could be achieved through deduction rather than practice by example. The commentator then abbreviates his justification for this claim, and refers the reader to (no longer extant) works of "the Socratics" which he says explain this argument in further detail.

=== Difference between Cyrene and Athens ===
In the dialogue, Theodorus of Cyrene and Socrates discuss the youth of Athens, and Socrates begins with remark about how he cares more for the youth of Athens than the youth of Cyrene. The commentator states that Socrates surely also cares for the Cyreneans, but that as an Athenian he naturally cares more for the youth of his own city due to the phenomenon of Oikeiôsis, often translated as "appropriation." The commentator then goes on to discuss the Stoic and Epicurean doctrine of appropriation, which bases justice on this intuitive feeling. The commentator argues that, because we naturally have more intense feelings of appropriation towards ourselves and our own neighbors rather than strangers, people who based their notion of justice on appropriation will preferentially act in their own interest rather than acting justly. Then the commentator cites an example of a shipwreck, the Plank of Carneades, where someone who based their morality on these intuitive feelings would choose to save a friend or neighbor over a stranger, and that even if this never occurs, the claim is still refuted. The commentator then relates an argument from the Academic skeptics against the Stoics and Epicureans, where he argues that those who fail to preserve justice in equal measure must necessarily fail to preserve it at all. The commentator says that Plato did not base justice on appropriation, but on "becoming like a God" referring to a later part of the Theaetetus, which he states that his commentary will discuss at that point, which is however not in the extant portion of the text.

=== Nature of the soul ===
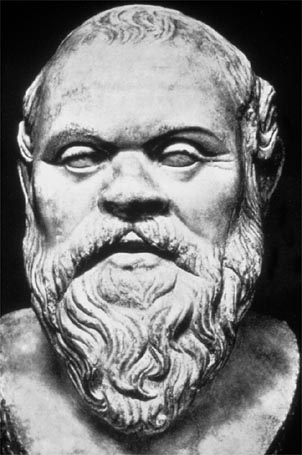
Socrates and Theaetetus are said to share a physical resemblance, including a snub nose and bulging eyes.

In the dialogue, Theodorus mentions one Athenian youth in particular who shows promise, Theaetetus. The commentator points out different virtues mentioned by the dialogue and associates them with the divisions of the soul made by Plato in the Republic: rational, spirited, and appetitive. The commentator contrasts the idea "of the ancients" of different virtues occurring in different people according to their natures with the Stoic idea that there is a single unified concept of virtue that manifests in different people in different amounts. The commentator discusses the "wax argument", that this fixed amount of virtue is inherently malleable, which he attributes to Aristo of Chios, a Stoic philosopher. Socrates states that he wants to investigate Theaetetus for himself, to see if he really possesses the virtue and wisdom that Theodorus claims. The commentator contrasts Theodorus, who is a mathematical expert, with someone able to judge the quality of someone's soul, stating that Theodorus' expertise should be examined in further detail, to see if the claim is actually true.

=== Different types of knowledge ===
==== Simple vs complex knowledge ====
Socrates asks Theaetetus if he is learning "a bit" of geometry. The commentator highlights this "a bit" as an opportunity to contrast simple knowledge, which consists of individual theorems in geometry or music, with composite systematic knowledge that is constructed from these such as the field of geometry, and provides three different examples of "simple" knowledge:

1. Plato's Meno, which defines it as "right opinion with an explanation"
2. Aristotle, who defines it as "supposition with proof"
3. Zeno the Stoic, who states that it is "disposition in the receipt of impressions which is not subject to argument."

==== Wisdom vs knowledge ====
Socrates and Theaetetus then discuss the difference between wisdom and knowledge. The commentator provides a lengthier exposition on the argument in a logic form:

- P1: Someone who learns becomes wiser
- P2: Someone who becomes wiser acquires wisdom
- P3: wisdom is knowledge
- C: Therefore, someone who learns acquires knowledge

However, the commentator observes that Socrates draws a different conclusion "wisdom and knowledge are the same" that does not follow this logical structure. This is not because the same people who become wise are also knowledgeable, as grammarians and musicologists are not the same just because the same people study grammar and music, but because both knowledge and wisdom have the same concern, learning, while grammar and music do not. The commentator stresses that the lead-in to the discussion "about what you are learning" shows that this is true even for simple knowledge.

==== Genus vs. differentia ====
In the dialogue, Socrates then asks about the nature of knowledge, and Theaetetus gives him examples, such as geometry and music. This provokes a long discussion on the distinction between giving an example of something and describing the thing itself. The commentator states that Theaetetus failed to give the essence of knowledge, and enumerated the species rather than the genus, as if someone was asked what an animal was and said "a man or a horse."

=== Irrational numbers ===
In the Theaetetus, the spiral of Theodorus is constructed in order to show which numbers up to 17 are perfect squares. Later mathematicians, including the Anonymous Theaetetus commentator, have debated the significance of stopping at 17.

In the dialogue, Theodorus and Theaetetus work through a mathematical problem related to irrational numbers using a geometrical construction now called the Spiral of Theodorus, though Plato does not describe the problem in full detail, leading a variety of interpreters from antiquity through the modern era to debate how to reconstruct the problem Plato was describing from his description. The anonymous commentator provides a lengthy exposition on the problem, that has also informed modern interpretations. In the dialogue, the roots of numbers up through 17 are shown to be irrational, however, the proof is stopped there. The commentator provides several explanations why he would have stopped at 17, rejecting the claim that it was arbitrary. First he states that because Theodorus was also a musician, the intent of the theorem is to show that tones are not divided into equal semitones, which he claims to have shown in his (lost) commentary on Plato's Timaeus. Second he considers the possibility that Theodorus stopped after 17 because it is the first non-square number after 16, which is the square for which the perimeter and the area are equal.

In the dialogue, the idea of generating a procedure that allows one to create a procedure for generating arbitrary perfect squares is discussed. The commentator then discusses the partition of the natural numbers, and the paradoxical idea that, although there are infinite numbers, it is possible to split them into two groups without enumerating them all first, such as even and odd, or prime and composite, or, as shown here, square and "oblong" (not a perfect square). In the dialogue, plane numbers and solid numbers are mentioned briefly. The commentator then discusses plane, cube, and solid numbers at length, and discusses how the same principles used to find square and oblong numbers can be further applied to perfect square numbers can be extended to finding perfect cubes,Pythagorean triples and Pythagorean quadruples, and then goes on to provide a classification of different types of plane and solid numbers that can be found.

The commentator concludes with an explanation of how this mathematical passage shows how one ought to pursue knowledge. 1) It is better to proceed from something more clear to something less clear, as Socrates and Theaetetus proceeded from magnitudes to numbers. 2) It is better to proceed from the universal to the particular, which is why they discussed "lengths" and then "powers" before "squares." 3) that understanding is reinforced by applying what has been learned to a new domain, as with applying what was learned about magnitudes and plain numbers to square and cubic numbers.

=== Midwife analogy ===
In the dialogue, Theaetetus is unable to apply the lessons he has learned from mathematics to the nature of knowledge. Socrates states that Theaetetus is "pregnant" and in labor, and that Socrates' role is to be the midwife who will draw out the birth of understanding. The commentator relates this to the Platonic doctrine of recollection (Anamnesis) outline in the Meno. According to this doctrine, all knowledge is already present in the soul, and that to learn something is the same as for it to be "remembered." The commentator then refers the reader to his (non-extant) work on the Phaedo for further exposition.

=== Sense perception ===
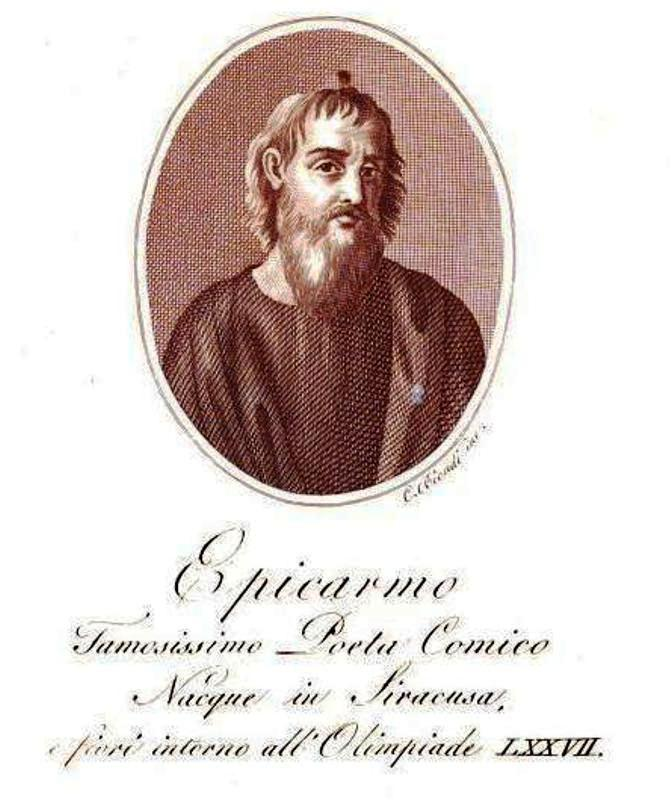
Epicharmus of Kos, an early Greek dramatist and philosopher, portrayed the absurdity of claiming that the whole universe is in flux in one of his plays.

In the remaining extant part of the commentary, which is very lacunose, the commentator discusses the idea of knowledge based on sense perception.

In the dialogue, Theaetetus gives a definition of knowledge as sense perception; the commentator notes that this is a shocking thing for a geometer to say, given the proof-based nature of mathematics, which leads into a discussion of how he must have developed this misconception, via Protagoras and his book On Truth. The commentator then distinguishes the relativism of Protagoras from the skepticism of the Pyrrhonists; Protagoras says Protagoras says that these sense-impressions are the truth, while the Pyrrhonists claim that dogmatic statements about the truth are impossible. Protagoras states that sense-impressions are relative due to the inherent flux of the universe; the Pyrrhonists reject the idea that the content of sense-organs themselves have any distinct reality. The commentator then distinguishes between Protagoras and the Cyrenaics; Protagoras says that wind is cold or warm relative to who experiences it, while the Cyrenaics say that someone can observe that they are being burned by a fire, but cannot extrapolate that it is in the nature (Physis) of fire to burn.

The dialogue then discusses the Heraclitean idea that all entities are constantly in flux, and states that it is a credible view; a doctrine assented to by Protagoras, Heraclitus, Empedocles, and most of the sophists, and all wise men other than Parmenides, cannot be dismissed easily. In order to refute the idea of flux, the commentator introduces the "growth" argument, which he attributes to Pythagoras, and also states that Plato used the same argument in the Symposium, and that it was favored by the Academic skeptics in arguing against the Stoics. According to the commentator, Epicharmus of Kos, an Old Comedy poet known for philosophical themes in his plays, learned this argument from the Pythagoreans, which he adapted into a play to illustrate the absurdity of the claim that humans do not persist over time:

a man who is asked for his contribution to a feast denies that he is the same man, on the grounds that some parts have been added to him and others lost. When the man asking for the contribution hit him and was summoned to court, he in turn says that the man who did the hitting was different from the one being summoned.

After this point in the text, the commentator further elaborates his own version of the growth argument, but the papyrus is too fragmentary at this point to reconstruct the exact argument being made by the commentator. The commentary then cuts off entirely in the midst of a discussion on knowledge of colors at Theaetetus 153d8, though four other papyrus fragments are extant, on 157b8-158a2, discussing false sense-impressions arising from dreams, diseases, and madness.

== Themes ==
The arguments on knowledge provide valuable historical context for the development of Platonic epistemology, as well as preserving information on other philosophical traditions of the time which the commentator argues against, such as Academic skepticism, Stoicism, and Epicureanism. As a Middle Platonist, the commentator weighs the doctrines of both Academic Skepticism and Stoicism, sometimes arguing in favor of Skepticism against Stoicism. Anon mentions the Stoics four times by name in the commentary and discusses several of their doctrines including Oikeiôsis and Kathekon (proper function). The commentator also discusses the "growing argument" which had been favored by the Academic skeptics.

== Legacy ==
The influence of the commentary on later Middle Platonism is difficult to determine, due to the ambiguity in the date of composition. The Theaetetus commentary shows similarities with the works of Alcinous in their exposition on Anamnesis, Plato's theory of "recollection" as outlined in the Meno and Phaedo. Both the anonymous commentator and Alcinous treat recollection as a natural process of remembering that unfolds from memories of previous lives. Many of the surviving works of Apuleius, also in the middle of the second century, show similarities to these works, as do the philosophical works of Galen. However, this exposition shows marked differences with the exposition of works of Plutarch, Numenius of Apamea, and Celsus, which treat Anamnesis as a more deep and intentional form of contemplation.

The commentary did not survive through medieval manuscript transmission, and is unknown other than the sole surviving manuscript, a fragmentary papyrus which was discovered in 1901 in Egypt. The commentary was published in 1905 by Hermann Diels, and attracted little attention at first, as the arguments in it were seen as relatively undeveloped and historians of philosophy and classical scholars of the late 19th and early 20th centuries, such as Eduard Zeller dismissed the eclectism of the period, and generally the commentators on Plato were not seen as original philosophers in their own right.

However, more recent scholarly interest in the historical developments of Ancient Roman philosophy and the commentary tradition in general have prompted more analysis as the commentary is both the only extant commentary on Plato from the period, and the earliest extant Ancient Greek commentary of a philosophical text.

== Notes ==
References to the Theaetetus are given in Stephanus pagination, while column numbers are given in Roman numerals for the commentary, based on the edition of Hermann Diels.

== Editions and translations ==
- Heiberg, Johan Ludvig; Schubart, Wilhelm (1905). Diels, Hermann (ed.). Anonymer kommentar zu Platons Theaetet (papyrus 9782) nebst drei bruchstücken philosophischen inhalts (pap. n. 8; p. 9766. 9569) (in Ancient Greek and German). Weidmann.
- "'Commentarium in Platonis "Theaetetum"'". Corpus dei papiri filosofici greci e latini : CPF : testi e lessico nei papiri di cultura greca e latina (in Italian and Ancient Greek). Vol. III. Firenze. 1995. pp. 227–562. ISBN 9788822243010.
- Hene, Bernd (2018). Ein anonymer Kommentar zu Platons Theaitetos und seine philosophische Bedeutung (Diss. Leuven) (in Ancient Greek and German).
- Boys-Stones, George (5 May 2019). "(anon.) Commentary on the Theaetetus P.Berol. inv. 9782 draft translation". academia.edu.
