= Conrad of Prussia =

Conrad of Prussia may refer to:

- Conrad of Prussia (commentator) (fl. before 1323), philosopher
- Conrad of Grossis (died 1426), Dominican reformer
