= Commentaries on Plato =

Commentaries on Plato refers to the great mass of literature produced, especially in the ancient and medieval world, to explain and clarify the works of Plato. Many Platonist philosophers in the centuries following Plato sought to clarify and summarise his thoughts, but it was during the Roman era, that the Neoplatonists, in particular, wrote many commentaries on individual dialogues of Plato, many of which survive to the present day.

== Greek commentators ==
Many of the scholars in the Platonic Academy sought to clarify and explain Plato's ideas. Already in the 3rd century BC, we hear of a commentary to Plato's Timaeus being written by Crantor of Soli; and in the 1st century AD a commentary on Plato's Republic was written by Onasander. The earliest surviving commentary is an anonymous work on the Theaetetus that was written between the 1st century BC and the 2nd century AD. By the 2nd century the Middle Platonists were producing paraphrases and summaries of Plato's thought. Thus we have Albinus, who wrote an introduction to Plato's works, and Alcinous and Apuleius who both wrote manuals of Platonism. From the physician Galen we have fragments of a commentary on the Timaeus. Already though the influence of Aristotle was being felt on the popular Platonism of the day, and we have the figure of Atticus (c. 175) who opposed the eclecticism which had invaded the school and contested the theories of Aristotle as an aberration from Plato.

The Neoplatonists though sought to exhibit the philosophical ideas of Plato and Aristotle as a unity. Porphyry (3rd century) attempted in a special work to show the agreement of Aristotelian and Platonist philosophy and wrote a number of commentaries on Plato, Aristotle, and Theophrastus. Porphyry's student Iamblichus, who established a new curriculum of study of the Platonic dialogues that would go on to influence Platonism for the rest of Late antiquity wrote commentaries on the First Alcibiades, Phaedo, Sophist, Phaedrus, Philebus, Timaeus, and Parmenides, of which fragments survive in later commentaries. Additional commentaries on Plato were written by Plutarch of Athens, and Syrianus, and Hermias. The best commentaries date from this era; most of the works of Proclus are commentaries on single dialogues of Plato and similar subjects. The commentaries on Plato were either given in lectures or written; and many have come down to us. Later Neoplatonist commentators on Plato whose works partially survive include Damascius and Olympiodorus.

In the Byzantine era, Aristotle was read more often than Plato, because of the importance placed on Aristotle's logical treatises. A key figure was Arethas, the 10th century Archbishop of Caesarea, who concerned himself with the preservation of the manuscripts of Plato and other ancient writers, and wrote scholia to the texts of Plato in his own hand. By the 11th century enthusiastic admirers of Platonism could be found in figures such as Michael Psellos and John Italus. The only surviving commentary from the late empire is a commentary on the Parmenides by George Pachymeres.

== Islamic commentaries ==
Compared to Aristotle, Plato figured far less prominently in Islamic philosophy. He was seen more as a symbol and as an inspiration rather than a source of practical philosophy. Islamic Platonism, when it came, was a development within Aristotelian philosophy. Far fewer of his works were known to the Islamic world than those of Aristotle. It seems that only the Laws, the Sophist, the Timaeus, and the Republic, were available in Arabic translation. Averroes, who wrote many commentaries on Aristotle, was probably motivated to write his one Platonic commentary, on the Republic, only because he could not find a copy of Aristotle's Politics.

== Latin commentaries ==
A partial translation and commentary in Latin of Plato's Timaeus by Calcidius was the only substantial work of Plato known to scholars in the Latin west until the translation of the Meno and Phaedo by Henricus Aristippus in 1156.

== See also ==
- Commentaries on Aristotle
- Platonism
- Scholia

== Sources ==
- Georg Wilhelm Friedrich Hegel (1896), Lectures on the History of Philosophy, Part One. Greek Philosophy.
- Eduard Zeller (1895), Outlines of the History of Greek Philosophy.
- Dimiter Angelov (2007), Imperial Ideology and Political Thought in Byzantium, 1204-1330. Cambridge University Press
- Hugh H. Benson (2006), A Companion to Plato. Blackwell
- Antony Black (2001), The History of Islamic Political Thought. Routledge
- Eleanor Dickey (2007), Ancient Greek Scholarship. Oxford University Press
- Albrecht Dihle (1994), Greek and Latin Literature of the Roman Empire: From Augustus to Justinian. Routledge
- Edward Grant (2004), Science and Religion, 400 B.C. to A.D. 1550, pages 93–4. Greenwood Publishing Group
- George Alexander Kennedy (1999), Classical Rhetoric & Its Christian & Secular Tradition from Ancient to Modern Times. UNC Press
