= De ente et essentia =

Philosophy book

De ente et essentia (transl. On Being and Essence) was written by scholastic philosopher and Catholic saint Thomas Aquinas (1225–1274) between approximately 1252 and 1256. It explains the metaphysical relationship between a thing's esse (being), or "whatness", and its essentia (existence), or "is-ness".

The earliest commentary on De ente et essentia was written by Conrad of Prussia before 1323. Other commentators include Armand de Belvézer, Gennadios Scholarios, Gerardus de Monte, John Versor, Jan of Głogów, Thomas Cajetan, Peter Crockaert, Girolamo Contarini and Raphael Riva.
