= Conrad of Grossis =

Conrad of Grossis (died 10 March 1426), also known as Conrad of Prussia, (Note: His name is also given as Conrad de Grossis, Conrad Grossius, Conrad of Brussia, Konrad von Preussen (Preußen) or Konrad von Brüssen.) was a Dominican reformer, the earliest promoter of the order's strict observance in the German lands.

Conrad's surname indicates that he hailed from Prussia unless it derives from a misspelling of Brussels, as has been argued. He entered the Dominican Order in 1370. On several visits to Rome, he developed a reputation for wild living. In 1387, he was appointed vicar of a church in Berlin, Sancta Maria in Valle Iosaphat iuxta Berlin, and given permission to undertake a pilgrimage to the Holy Land. After his return from pilgrimage in 1388, he was named vicar general of the Dominican province of Teutonia by the general chapter of the order meeting in Vienna and charged with reforming the friaries.

Conrad was named vicar of the convent of Bern in 1388 and vicar and prior of the first Observant convent in Germany at Colmar in 1389. He introduced the observance into the female house of Schönensteinbach in 1397. In 1396, he reformed the convent of Nuremberg. From these origins, the observance spread throughout the Rhineland, Switzerland and the Netherlands. He also introduced the observance at Utrecht in the province of Saxonia.

The death in 1399 of the master general Raymond of Capua, who had supported Conrad's career since 1387, set back the observant movement. In 1416, Conrad retired soon after to Schönensteinbach, where he was the sisters' confessor. He enjoyed a high reputation as a preacher and for his knowledge of the Bible. He died at Schönensteinbach on 10 March 1426. He was buried in Schönensteinbach. He was succeeded as vicar of the observant Dominicans in Germany by Johannes Nider. The Dominican historian Johannes Meyer tried to promote sainthood by collecting accounts of his holiness, including miraculous visions.

Conrad may be the Conrad of Prussia to whom two philosophical commentaries are attributed, but this author's dates are usually placed much earlier.

== Bibliography ==
- Eßer, Ambrosius (1980). "Konrad de Grossis (von Preußen, von Brüssen)". Neue Deutsche Biographie (in German). Vol. 12. Berlin: Duncker & Humblot. pp. 540–540. (full text online).
- Fidora, Alexander (2009). "Una nota sobre Conrado de Prusia, comentador del De unitate de Gundisalvo" (PDF). Lo uno y lo múltiple: Homenaje a Félix del Valle y Díaz. Real Academia de Bellas Artes y Ciencias Históricas de Toledo. pp. 145–148.
- Fournier, Gilbert (1989). "Grossis (Grossius) Conrad de (Conrad de Prusse)". Nouveau dictionnaire de biographie alsacienne.
- Huijbers, Anne (2015). "'Observance' as Paradigm in Mendicant and Monastic Order Chronicles". In James Mixson; Bert Roest (eds.). A Companion to Observant Reform in the Late Middle Ages and Beyond. Brill. pp. 111–143.
- Jones, Claire Taylor, ed. (2019). Women's History in the Age of Reformation: Johannes Meyer's Chronicle of the Dominican Observance. Pontifical Institute of Mediaeval Studies.
- Morsel, Joseph (2000). "Conrad of Grossis". In A. Vauchez (ed.). Encyclopedia of the Middle Ages. Vol. 1. Translated by A. Walford. Fitzroy Dearborn. p. 355.
- Wehrli-Johns, Martina (2008). "Konrad de Prusse". Dictionnaire historique de la Suisse. Translated by Elena Vuille-Mondada.
