= Conrad of Prussia (commentator) =

Conrad of Prussia was a Scholastic philosopher who wrote the earliest known commentary on Thomas Aquinas' De ente et essentia ('On Being and Essence'). He also wrote the only known commentary on Dominicus Gundissalinus' De unitate et uno ('On Unity and the One'). Both commentaries have been edited.

== Life ==
Nothing is known for certain of Conrad. His name in the genitive, Conradi de Prusya, appears incompletely erased in two places in codex 367 of Admont Abbey Library. In both instances, the surname de Prusya has been retained but the given name erased, albeit not well enough to be illegible in one case. Thus no certainty attaches to the name 'Conrad'. The surname implies that he was from Prussia. There is no evidence that Conrad was a Dominican friar. Martin Grabmann assumed that he was a secular priest.

Since Conrad is traditionally assumed to have written before 1323, he cannot be identified with the Dominican reformer Conrad of Prussia, who died in 1426. Alexander Fidora, however, argues that since the manuscript evidence places him in or about Vienna, where the later Conrad is also known to have been active, it is probable that they are the same person, which would shift the date of his works back considerably.

== Works ==
Conrad wrote in Latin. His commentaries are known from a single manuscript, now Admont 367, copied in the mid-14th century. It is not an autograph, since it contains numerous scribal errors.

The commentary on De ente is thought to have been written before 1323, since it refers to Aquinas as Brother Thomas rather than Saint Thomas. Conrad divides De ente into sixteen parts, providing a commentary which he calls a lectio (reading) on each. Preceding the commentary itself is a prooemium on the nature of philosophy in which Conrad cites Plato, Cicero, Seneca, Augustine and al-Ghazali. He cites Ibn Gabirol, but mistakes him for Anselm of Aosta. Conrad's language is highly technical and the existing copy is replete with abbreviations. The primary purpose of the commentary is to explain Aquinas and elaborate on his ideas. There are competing views on its philosophical value.

Conrad's commentary on De unitate is shorter. It was written around the same time. Since Conrad's commentary covers only two-thirds of the text and exhibits certain peculiarities, it has been possible to identify the manuscript of De unitate that he worked from. This is Codex Vindobonensis Palatinus 195, which is missing the same third of the treatise and contains the same textual variations. As De ente precedes De unitate in the manuscript, it is presumably the manuscript used by Conrad for both commentaries.

== Sources ==
- Bobik, Joseph, ed. (1974). The Commentary of Conrad of Prussia on the De Ente et Essentia of St. Thomas Aquinas. Martinus Nijhoff.
- Bobik, Joseph, ed. (1989). The Commentary of Conrad of Prussia on the De unitate et uno of Dominicus Gundissalinus. Edwin Mellen.
- Fidora, Alexander (2009). "Una nota sobre Conrado de Prusia, comentador del De unitate de Gundisalvo" (PDF). Lo uno y lo múltiple: Homenaje a Félix del Valle y Díaz. Real Academia de Bellas Artes y Ciencias Históricas de Toledo. pp. 145–148.
- Kluge, Eike-Henner W. (1979). "Review of Bobik 1974". Dialogue. 18 (3): 440–444. doi:10.1017/s0012217300045881.
- Maurer, Armand (1976). "Review of Bobik 1974". The Thomist. 40 (1): 174–177. doi:10.1353/tho.1976.0048.
- Polloni, Nicola (2023). "Dominicus Gundissalinus' On Unity and the One". In Katja Krause; Luis Xavier López-Farjeat; Nicholas A. Oschman (eds.). Contextualizing Premodern Philosophy: Explorations of the Greek, Hebrew, Arabic, and Latin Traditions. Routledge. pp. 293–307.
- Treloar, John L. (1976). "Review of Bobik 1974". Modern Schoolman. 54 (1): 72–75. doi:10.5840/schoolman19765418.
