= Martin Hertz =

German classical philologist (1818–1895)

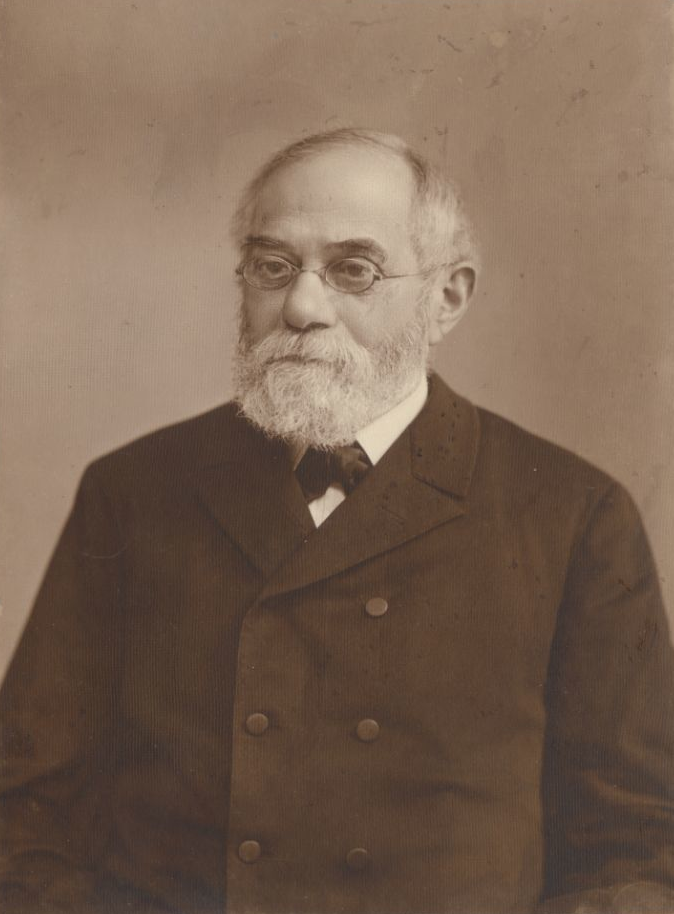
- Born: Martin Julius Hertz; 7 April 1818; Hamburg, German Confederation
- Died: 22 September 1895 (aged 77)

Academic background
- Education: University of Bonn; University of Berlin
- Thesis: De L. Cinciis commentationis particula (1842)

Martin Julius Hertz (7 April 1818, in Hamburg – 22 September 1895) was a German classical philologist, a student and biographer of Karl Lachmann.

He studied philology at the Universities of Bonn and Berlin, where his instructors included August Boeckh (1785–1867) and Karl Lachmann (1793–1851), the latter being an important influence to Hertz' career. He earned his doctorate in 1842, followed by his habilitation a few years later (1845). Afterwards, he embarked on an educational journey throughout Europe (southern Germany, Netherlands, Belgium, France, Italy and Austria).

In 1855 he became a professor of classical philology at the University of Greifswald, followed by a professorship at the University of Breslau several years later (1862).

He is especially known for his critical editions of Priscian and Aulus Gellius.

== Works ==
- De L. Cinciis commentationis particula: dissertatio philologica, Berolini, Typis Academiciis, 1842.
- Sinnius Capito: eine Abhandlung zur Geschichte der römischen Grammatik, Berlin, Oehmickes Buchhandlung, 1844.
- De P. Nigidii Figuli studiis atque operibus, Berolini, Imprensis Librariae Oehmigkianae typis academicis, 1845.
- Karl Lachmann: eine Biographie, Berlin, W. Hertz, 1851.
- Aulus Gellius, Noctium Atticarum libri XX, ex recensione Martini Hertz, 2 volumes, Lipsiae, sumptibus et typis B. G. Teubneri, 1853-61.
- Priscianus Caesariensis, Institutionum grammaticarum libri XVIII, ex recensione Martini Hertzii, 2 volumes, Lipsiae, in aedibus B. G. Teubneri, 1855-59.
- Titus Livius, Ab Urbe condita libri, edidit Martinus Hertz, 4 volumes, Lipsiae, ex officina Bernhardi Tauchnitz, 1857-64.
- Opuscula Gelliana lateinisch und deutsch, Berlin, Verlag von W. Hertz, 1886.
- Q. Horatius Flaccus, Carmina, relegit et apparatu critico selecto instruxit Martinus Hertz, Berolini, Weidmannos, 1892.
