= Immanuel the Roman =

Jewish scholar and poet

Immanuel of Rome
- Born: Immanuel ben Solomon ben Jekuthiel; 1261; Rome
- Died: 1332 (aged 70–71)
- Occupation: Poet
- Writing career
- Notable work: Mahberot Immanuel

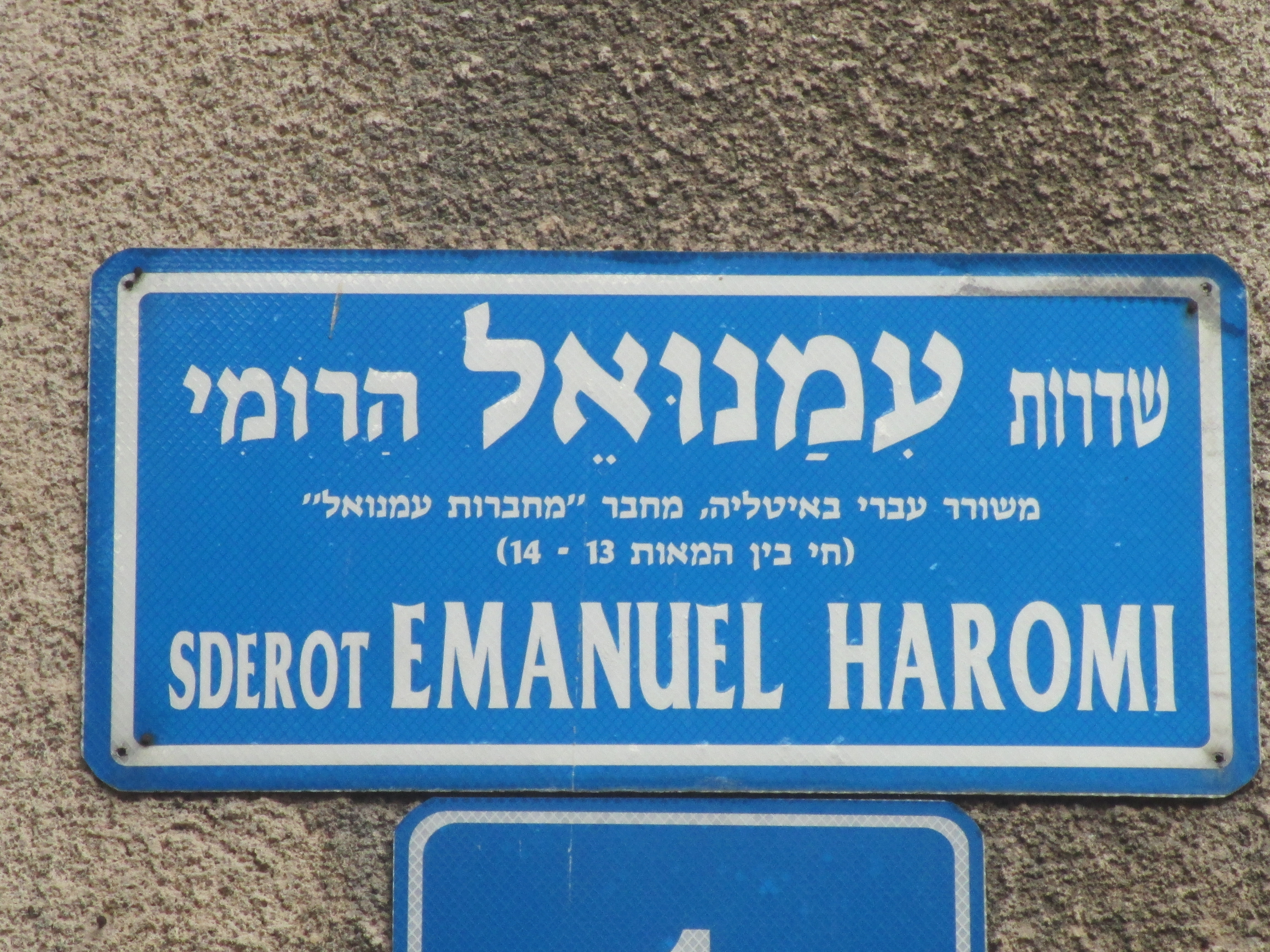
street in Tel Aviv

Immanuel ben Solomon ben Jekuthiel of Rome (Immanuel of Rome, Immanuel Romano, Manoello Giudeo) (1261 in Rome – 1332 in Fermo, Italy) was a Jewish poet and writer who lived in the Papal States and composed works in Hebrew and Italian. Immanuel’s most well-known work is his Hebrew-language maqama collection, the Mahberot Immanuel.

== Biography ==
Immanuel was born in Rome in 1261 to the Zifroni family. His cousin, Judah ben Moses Romano, was an author and translator employed by the King of Naples, Robert of Anjou. Immanuel served as the head of correspondence for Rome’s Jewish community and likely occupied another prominent position during his lifetime. He left Rome in 1321, perhaps in response to a papal edict of that year which ordered the expulsion of Jews from Rome. After this, he travelled around Italy, possibly residing in Gubbio. Immanuel likely died around 1335.

== Works ==
Immanuel wrote in both in Hebrew and Italian. He is the only Jewish author from this time with surviving Italian-language works. Apart from the Mahberot Immanuel, his most-known composition, he authored biblical commentaries, a work of Hermeneutics, a treatise on the esoteric aspects of the Hebrew alphabet (not extant), and five poems in Italian. He is the first poet to author a sonnet in a language other than Italian.

=== Mahberot Immanuel ===
Immanuel is most celebrated for the Mahberot Immanuel, a Hebrew collection of maqamat. The maqama, also referred to in Hebrew as mahberet, is a genre of rhymed prose that originated in Arabic but flourished in both Arabic and Hebrew in medieval Iberia. In his introduction to the Mahberot Immanuel, Immanuel references Judah al-Harizi’s Takhemoni. Hebrew was not a spoken language in either medieval Iberia or 14th-century Italy, so authors re-worked Biblical Hebrew to suit their literary exploits.

Mahberot Immanuel consists of 28 chapters that each deal with various subjects and inter-weave rhymed prose and metered verse. It reflects elements of Hebrew literary tradition as well as contemporary Italian literary trends. Immanuel’s sonnets employ motifs characteristic of Dante and Cecco Angiolieri, two contemporaries of Immanuel. The beloved is referred to both as a “gazelle,” typical of Arabic and Hebrew literary heritage, and as a “lady,” Immanuel’s translation of the Italian donna.

This maqama collection includes thirty-eight sonnets. Immanuel employs a meter that combines both Hebrew quantitative meter (itself an Andalusian adaptation from Arabic) and Italian syllabic meter. These sonnets were included amongst the 28 stories of the Mahberot. For example, in the third chapter, lovers exchange sonnets with each other.

Immanuel’s Mahberot Immanuel was a highly popular work amongst Hebrew readers. It was one of the early Hebrew works printed after the advent of the printing press, particularly since Italy was a center for Hebrew printing. Further proof of its notoriety is attested by its prohibition for reading on the Sabbath according to the 16th century legal code Shulchan Aruch.

Two of the most-known stories of the Mahberot Immanuel are the Scroll of Love (Megilat ha-Hesheq) and the Tale of Hell and Paradise (Mahberet ha-Tophet veha-'Eden).

Through a series of rhymed letters, the Scroll of Love recounts the story of Immanuel whose patron entices him to romantically pursue a nun who he has never seen. The pair exchange ten letters, four of them sonnets. Immanuel’s poetic chops convince the nun to run away with him however the tale turns sour when Immanuel discovers she is his patron’s half-sister. His patron threatens to cut off his support of Immanuel and so Immanuel is forced to end the budding romance. Heartbroken and humiliated, the woman stops eating and drinking and quickly dies. Immanuel mourns her death with a sonnet

The Tale of Hell and Paradise is an account of hell and heaven delivered by Immanuel’s literary persona who was guided by Daniel. Daniel is either a reference to the biblical prophet or to Dante. He includes a description of a sinner bound to a post crowned with thorns, possibly an allusion to Jesus. Notably, this man is being punished for his heretical and sexually improper acts. Daniel and Immanuel meet other biblical and contemporary people in hell and heaven. Scholars have pointed to similarities between Immanuel’s story and Dante’s Divine Comedy. Immanuel, unlike Dante, does not include Purgatory, as it is not part of Jewish theology. Interestingly, this section is the lone story cast exclusively in rhymed prose without any sections of metered verse.

=== Italian poems ===
Immanuel is the only Jewish poet from this period with extant Italian poetry. Immanuel authored five poems in Italian – four sonnets and Bisbidis. Bisbidis was well-received and included in poetic anthologies from this time. Bisbidis has received scholarly attention for its inventiveness and rich onomatopoeia.
