= Lucius Calvenus Taurus =

2nd century Greek philosopher of the Middle Platonist school

Lucius Calvenus Taurus (Ancient Greek: Λούκιος Καλβῆνος Ταῦρος, romanized: Loúkios Kalbē̃nos Taũros, also Calvisius Taurus; fl. second century AD) was a Greek philosopher of the Middle Platonist school.

== Biography ==
Taurus was a native of Berytos (present-day Beirut) and, according to Jerome, reached the age of forty in the year 145, so he would have been born around 105. (Note: Dillon disputes Jerome's dating, arguing that Taurus would have been born already in the first century CE. Gioè and Lakmann refute some of Dillon's reasoning.) He lived in Athens, where he ran a Platonist school in the tradition of the Academy from his home. Two of his students are known by name: the politician Herodes Atticus and the writer Aulus Gellius. The latter accompanied Taurus on his journey to Delphi, where the pair were spectators at the Pythian Games and Taurus obtained citizenship. This voyage was traditionally dated to 163, but its dating is now considered uncertain.

Gellius is one of the main sources for Taurus's life and works, providing anecdotes and accounts of dinner conversations. Gellius, though, never qualified for advanced courses in philosophy, and his dialogues involving Taurus contain some literary embellishments. In these, advice and reprimands aimed at character formation play an important role. In formal education, Taurus permitted his students the liberty to ask questions.

The picture that Gellius paints of his tutor is that of a mild, friendly and well-educated man, equipped with a thorough knowledge of the Platonic dialogues. He lamented the decline of education, amateurism and the arrogance of those who only pretended to be interested in serious education. Following Platonic tradition, he distanced himself from rhetoric, in which he saw a deviation from the actual problems of philosophy. He especially disliked the lack of philosophical interest of those who sought to be tutored by him, holding as an example of superficiality a prospective student whose only reason to be interested in Plato was to improve his verbal skills.

== Works ==
The Suda attributes to Taurus a treatise On the Distinction between the Theories of Plato and those of Aristotle (Peri tēs tōn dogmátōn diaphorás Plátōnos kai Aristotélous) and one On the Material and the Immaterial, among other works. According to Gellius, Taurus wrote extensive commentaries to Plato's dialogues (in particular, Gorgias and Timaeus) as well as a text in which he critiqued Stoic philosophy from a Platonic standpoint and pointed out contradictions in Stoic thought.

He also wrote a work, now lost, on wrath, which he described as a disease. It is uncertain whether this was a treatise devoted to this single topic. A commentary on Plato's Republic, attributed to a certain Taurus of Sidon, was probably written by Calvenus Taurus.

All of Taurus's works are lost, except for some fragments of his commentaries on Timaeus and the Republic.

== Philosophy ==
Like many Platonists, Taurus held the conviction that the world was eternal and un-created. From this he concluded that the account of creation in Plato's Timaeus was to be read as a metaphor, intended only as a didactic device. He considered various metaphoric readings of Plato's text and listed four non-temporal meanings of the word genētós ("created", "become"). He favored an interpretation in which the created nature of the world exists in its character as a process: the cosmos was only created insofar as it is ever changing, never ceasing to become.

Taurus refused to obscure the differences between Plato and Aristotle; he defended Platonism with religious fervor against the Stoics and Epicureans. He particularly rejected the Stoic ideal of apatheia, defending instead the Platonic and peripatetic concept of metriopatheia (moderation). In his critique of Stoicism he followed Plutarch, whose work he admired and cited regularly. His relation to Aristotelian philosophy was not one of total rejection: despite differences of opinion, he used Aristotle's writing in his teaching.
