= Alcinous (philosopher) =

2nd-century Greek philosopher

Alcinous (Greek: Ἀλκίνοος Alkinoos) was a Middle Platonist philosopher. He probably lived in the 2nd century AD, although nothing is known about his life. He is the author of The Handbook of Platonism, an epitome of Middle Platonism intended as a manual for teachers. He has, at times, been identified by some scholars with the 2nd century Middle Platonist Albinus.

== Writings ==
Alcinous is the author of work called The Handbook of Platonism (Ἐπιτομὴ τῶν Πλάτωνος δογμάτων, also Διδασκαλικὸς τῶν Πλάτωνος δογμάτων; Latin: De doctrina Platonis), one of the few surviving works from the Middle Platonist period (c. 90 BC – 250 AD). The book contains 36 chapters which cover topics ranging from logic to physics to ethics. It is thought to have been intended as a manual, not for students of Platonism, but for its teachers. The treatise is written in the esoteric manner typical of the Corpus Aristotelicum, and it often appropriates popular concepts from other philosophical schools—in particular the Peripatetic and Stoic schools—which could be seen as having been prefigured in the works of Plato.

Alcinous's handbook has been dated to the middle of the 2nd century AD. In 1879 the German scholar Jacob Freudenthal argued that Alcinous was really the philosopher Albinus, the teacher of Galen the physician. This theory remained largely unchallenged until 1974, when John Whittaker made a fresh case convincingly reaffirming Alcinous's authenticity.

Alcinous held the world and its animating soul to be eternal. This soul of the universe was not created by God, but, to use the image of Alcinous, it was awakened by him as from a profound sleep, and turned towards himself, "that it might look out upon intellectual things and receive forms and ideas from the divine mind." It was the first of a succession of intermediate beings between God and man. The idea proceeded immediately from the mind of God, and were the highest object of our intellect; the "form" of matter, the types of sensible things, having a real being in themselves. He differed from the earlier Platonists in confining the ideas to general laws: it seemed an unworthy notion that God could conceive an idea of things artificial or unnatural, or of individuals or particulars, or of any thing relative. He seems to have aimed at harmonizing the views of Plato and Aristotle on the ideas, as he distinguished them from the eidos, forms of things, which he allowed were inseparable: a view which seems necessarily connected with the doctrine of the eternity and self-existence of matter. God, the first fountain of the ideas, could not be known as he is: it is but a faint notion of him we obtain from negations and analogies: his nature is equally beyond our power of expression or conception. Below him are a series of beings (daimones) who superintend the production of all living things, and hold intercourse with men. The human soul passes through various transmigrations, thus connecting the series with the lower classes of being, until it is finally purified and rendered acceptable to God. His system is understood as a synthesis of Plato and Aristotle, with some elements borrowed from the East, and perhaps derived from a study of the Pythagorean system, which experienced a revival of sorts concomitant to that which produced Middle Platonism.

== Sources ==
- John M. Dillon, Alcinous, The Handbook of Platonism, 1993, Oxford. ISBN 0-19-823607-7
- Dirk Baltzly, "The Virtues and 'Becoming Like God': Alcinous to Proclus", in Oxford Studies in Ancient Philosophy, Volume XXVI, David Sedley (ed), (Oxford: 2004).
- John Whittaker, "Numenius and Alcinous on the First Principle", Phoenix 32: 144–154 (1978).
