= Louis Carrion =

Flemish humanist and classical scholar (1547–1595)

Louis Carrion (Ludovicus Carrio) (1547 – 23 June 1595) was a Flemish humanist and classical scholar. He is known for his precocious edition of the Argonautica of Gaius Valerius Flaccus, from 1565/6. This was printed from a manuscript now referred to as the Codex Carrionis, or C; which was later lost. Carrion's scholarship has regularly been challenged, ever since.

He is known too for commentary on Sallust (1574), and work on Tertullian, the astrologer Censorinus (1583), and Aulus Gellius (1585, with Henry Estienne). He also published letters of Ogier de Busbecq.

== Works ==
- In Valerii Flacci Setini Balbi Argonauticon libros octo castigationes (Antwerp, Plantinus, 1566)
- Antiquarum lectionum commentarii III. In quibus varia scriptorum veterum loca supplentur, corriguntur et illustrantur
