= Judah ben Moses Romano =

Judah ben Moses Romano (c. 1293 – after 1330) was an Italian Jewish philosopher and translator of the fourteenth century. He was a cousin of Immanuel of Rome.

He was a significant early translator of works of scholastic philosophy from Latin into Hebrew. He was the first Hebrew translator of Thomas Aquinas; he also translated Albertus Magnus, Giles of Rome, Alexander of Alessandri, Domenicus Gundissalinus and Angelo of Camerino.

He translated sections of the Divine Comedy of Dante, and gave public readings of it. He was employed by Robert of Naples, along with Immanuel and Kalonymus ben Kalonymus.
