= Dominicus Gundissalinus =

12th-century Spanish translator and philosopher

Dominicus Gundissalinus, also known as Domingo Gundisalvi or Gundisalvo (c. 1115 – after 1190), was a philosopher and translator of Arabic to Medieval Latin active in Toledo, Spain. Among his translations, Gundissalinus worked on Avicenna's Liber de philosophia prima and De anima, Ibn Gabirol's Fons vitae, and al-Ghazali's Summa theoricae philosophiae, in collaboration with the Jewish philosopher Abraham Ibn Daud and Johannes Hispanus. As a philosopher, Gundissalinus crucially contributed to the Latin assimilation of Arabic philosophy, being the first Latin thinker in receiving and developing doctrines, such as Avicenna's modal ontology or Ibn Gabirol's universal hylomorphism, that would soon be integrated into the thirteenth-century philosophical debate.

== Life ==
Born in Castile around 1115–1125, Gundissalinus received his education in Chartres, supposedly following the teaching of William of Conches and Thierry of Chartres. Since 1148, Gundissalinus is in Castile: the capitular archives of Segovia refer to him as archdeacon of Cuéllar, a small town not far from Segovia, where he presumably spent around 14 years, regarding which almost no information is available. Following Ibn Daud's request to the archbishop of Toledo, John II, to start a series of translations into Latin of Avicenna's Kitab al-Shifāʾ, Gundissalinus moved to Toledo in 1161–1162, where he worked with Ibn Daud on the translation of Avicenna's De anima, realised before 1166.

Gundissalinus remained in Toledo for twenty years, collaborating with Abraham Ibn Daud and Johannes Hispanus to the realisation of around twenty translations of Arabic works into Latin. In the Castilian capital, Gundissalinus also wrote his philosophical treatises. The Toledan chapter names Gundissalinus for the last time in 1178 but he presumably remained in Toledo at least until 1181, when a document written in Arabic mentions his name.

The last record witnessing Gundissalinus alive is the report of a meeting between the chapters of Segovia and Burgos, held in Segovia in 1190. It is probable that the last years of Gundissalinus's life were spent in that Castilian town, and he died sometime after 1190.

== Translations of Gundissalinus ==
Together with Avendauth, that is, Abraham ibn Daud, and Iohannes Hispanus, Gundissalinus translated around twenty philosophical works from Arabic to Latin, which decisively marked the passage from Platonism to Aristotelianism typical of Latin speculation of the 13th century. Translations traditionally attributed to Gundissalinus are:

Alexander of Aphrodisias, De intellectu et intellecto al-Farabi, De intellectu et intellecto al-Kindi, De intellectu Avicenna, De anima seu sextus naturalium Avicenna, De convenientia et differentia subiectorum al-Farabi, Exposición del V libro de los Elementa de Euclide pseudo al-Kindi, Liber introductorius in artem logicae pseudo al-Farabi, De ortu scientiarum Isaac Israeli ben Solomon, Liber de definitionibus Avicenna, Logica Avicenna, De universalibus Al-Ghazali, Logica Avicena, Liber de philosophia prima Avicena, Liber primus naturalium, tractatus primus Avicenna, Liber primus naturalium, tractatus secundus al-Ghazali, Metaphysica Avicebron, Fons vitae Pseudo-Avicena, Liber caeli et mundi al-Farabi, Liber exercitationis ad viam felicitatis al-Farabi, Fontes quaestionum Avicenna, Prologus discipuli et capitula Avicenna, De viribus cordis

== Works ==
Dominicus Gundissalinus also wrote five philosophical works, in which he embraces the ideas of Avicenianna and al-Gabirol, combining them with the Latin philosophical tradition, and particularly Boethius together with some authors of his time, such as the philosophers of the School of Chartres or Herman of Carinthia. Gundissalinus' treatises show his deep knowledge of Arabic-Hebrew philosophy, and there are the three philosophical disciplines that characterize his thought: metaphysics, epistemology and psychology. The five treatises of Dominicus Gundissalinus are:

- De divisione philosophiae – is an epistemological treatise in which Gundissalinus proposes his division of philosophy into various scientific disciplines, structured hierarchically. In this work, Gundissalinus combines the divisions of al-Farabi and Avicenna with the classifications of knowledge of Isidore of Seville and Boethius. It had a prolific diffusion and reception in Latin land.
- De scientiis – this is a Gundisalvian revision of al-Farabi's work of the same name, very similar to De divisione, although the latter manifests a higher level of philosophical analysis and critical reception of Latin sources.
- De anima – De anima is a treatise on psychology in which Gundissalinus mainly welcomes Avicenna's De anima, often modifying the speculative results that could be problematic for Latin reflection, and ibn Gabirol's Fons Vitae.
- De unitate et uno – brief metaphysical and ontological treatise where Gundissalinus examines the onto-metaphysical and theological doctrine of the One, following the Arabic-Hebrew and Latin Neoplatonic tradition, and in particular the perspective of ibn Gabirol. Often misattributed to Boethius, this treatise was transalted into Hebrew by Judah ben Moses Romano and commented upon by Conrad of Prussia in the 14th century.
- De processione mundi – work of maturity, here Gundissalinus analyzes the generation of creation from the prima cause, following the various logical-ontological distinctions that are specified in the progressive unions of matter and form, until the generation of sentient creatures. In this treatise, the doctrine of universal hylemorphism inherited from ibn Gabirol and of which Gundissalinus is one of the main supporters, plays a fundamental role.

In addition to these five treatises, on which scholars agree, the De immortalitate animae has also been traditionally attributed to Gundissalinus, a text that the majority of the academic community nevertheless attributes to William of Auvergne. Gundissalinus' works were well received. both in the Latin philosophical field, and in the Hebrew.

== See also ==
- Toledo School of Translators
- Latin translations of the 12th century
