= Alexander Fidora =

Catalan Professor of German origin

- Born: 1975 (age 50–51); Offenbach am Main, Hesse, West Germany
- Education: Goethe University Frankfurt (PhD)

Alexander Fidora (born 1975) is a Catalan Professor of German origin. He is ICREA Research Professor of Philosophy and Medieval studies at the Autonomous University of Barcelona (UAB).

== Education ==
He obtained his PhD in 2003 at the Department of Philosophy at Goethe University Frankfurt with a thesis on Dominicus Gundissalinus and 12th century epistemology. During the period 2003–2006, he directed in Frankfurt, together with Matthias Lutz-Bachmann, a research project on the history of philosophy during the 12th–14th centuries at the Collaborative Research Center from the Deutsche Forschungsgemeinschaft (DFG) “Wissenskultur und gesellschaftlicher Wandel”.

== Teaching ==
Until 2006, Alexander Fidora taught in the Philosophy Departament at Frankfurt University. In 2006, he became Research Professor at the Institució Catalana de Recerca i Estudis Avançats (ICREA-Catalan Institute of Advanced Studies) in the Department of Ancient and Medieval Sciences of the Autonomous University of Barcelona (UAB). He has been visiting professor at the Saint Louis University (2004 and 2007), the Panamerican University/México D.F (2008) and the University of Frankfurt (2023).

== Research ==
Alexander Fidora's research deals with the intercultural and interreligious dimension of medieval thought. He focuses on the influence of Arab philosophy on medieval epistemology, the translation of the Talmud into Latin and its influence, as well as the works of Medieval Catalan authors such as Arnaldus Nova, Ramon Llull or Francesc Eiximenis. Among others, he has directed two research projects of the European Research Council (ERC) “Latin Philosophy into Hebrew” (2008–2012) and “The Latin Talmud” (2014–2019).

Fidora has been a fellow in the Käte-Hamburger-Kolleg “Fate and Prognostication” at the University of Erlangen-Nuremberg (2012 and 2014) and the Katz Center for Advanced Judaic Studies, University of Pennsylvania (2013). He has been president of the Sociedad de Filosofía Medieval (SOFIME-Society of Medieval Philosophy, 2011–2016) and vice-president of the Société Internationale pour l'Étude de la Philosophie Médiévale (SIEPM-International Society for the Study of Medieval Philosophy, 2017–2022).

He is (co)editor of several book series, such as “Bibliotheca Philosophorum Medii Aevi Cataloniae” (Obrador Edèndum), “Herders Bibliothek der Philosophie des Mittelalters” (Herder) o “Katalanische Literatur des Mittelalters” (Lit/Barcino).

Since 2017, he is a member of the Academia Europaea.

== Awards ==
For his researches on medieval thought, Fidora has received the following awards:

- Catalonia Internacional Prize (Barcelona, 2011).
- Samuel Toledano Prize (Jerusalem, 2012).
- Alexander von Humboldt Research Prize (Bonn, 2022).

== Publications (selection) ==
- Raimundus Lullus: Ars brevis (lateinisch-deutsch), edition and translation into German by A. Fidora, Hamburg: Felix Meiner (Philosophische Bibliothek 518), 1999. (in Latin) (in German)
- Die Wissenschaftstheorie des Dominicus Gundissalinus – Voraussetzungen und Konsequenzen des zweiten Anfangs der aristotelischen Philosophie im 12. Jahrhundert, Berlin: Akademie Verlag, 2003. (in German)
- A. Akasoy & A. Fidora (eds.), The Arabic Version of the ‘Nicomachean Ethics’, with an Introduction and Annotated Translation by Douglas M. Dunlop, Leiden/Boston: Brill (ASL 17), 2005. (in English)
- A Fidora & J. E. Rubio (eds.), Raimundus Lullus. An Introduction to his Life, Works and Thought, Turnhout: Brepols (CCCM 214, SL II), 2008. (in English)
- Vicent Ferrer, De unitate universalis – Ma’amar nikhbad ba-kolel, edition and translation into Catalan and English by A. Fidora & M. Zonta, Santa Coloma de Queralt/Barcelona: Obrador Edèndum/UAB/URV (BPhMAC 1), 2010. (in Hebrew) (in Latin) (in Catalan) (in English)
- A. Fidora, H. Hames & Y. Schwartz (eds.), Latin-into-Hebrew: Texts in Contexts, Leiden/Boston: Brill, 2013. (in English)
- Guiu Terrena, Confutatio errorum quorundam magistrorum, edition and translation into Catalan and English by A. Fidora, A. Blasco & C. López Alcalde, Santa Coloma de Queralt/Barcelona: IEC/Obrador Edèndum/UAB/URV (BPhMAC 3), 2014. (in Latin) (in Catalan) (in English)
- Arnau de Vilanova: Über den Antichrist und die Reform der Christenheit, translation into German by A. Fidora, Barcelona/Münster i. W.: Barcino/Lit, 2015. (in German)
- G. Hasselhoff & A. Fidora (eds.), Ramon Martí’s Pugio fidei: Studies and Texts, Santa Coloma de Queralt: Obrador Edèndum, 2017. (in Latin) (in English)
- A. Fidora & Hasselhoff (eds.), The Talmud in Dispute During the High Middle Ages, Bellaterra: Servei de Publicacions de la UAB, 2019. (in English)
- A. Fidora, Albertus Magnus und der Talmud (Lectio Albertina 20), Münster i. W.: Aschendorff Verlag, 2020. (in German)
- Extractiones de Talmud per ordinem thematicum, ed. U. Cecini, Ó. de la Cruz, A. Fidora & I. Lampurlanés (CCCM 291A), Turnhout: Brepols, 2021. (in Latin) (in English)
- Francesc Eiximenis: Die Regierung des Gemeinwesens (katalanisch-deutsch), edition and translation into German of the Regiment de la cosa pública by A. Fidora, Freiburg i. Br.: Herder (HBPhMA 60), 2024. (in Catalan) (in German)
