= Aulus Gellius =

2nd-century Roman author and grammarian

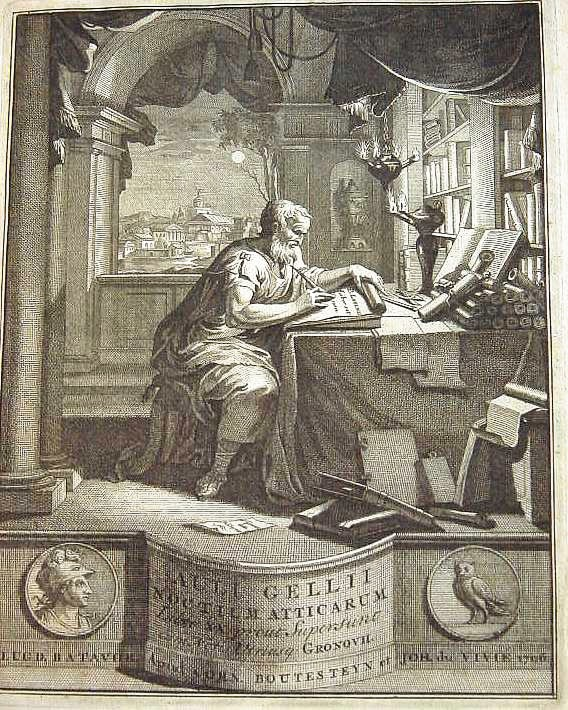
- Frontispiece to a 1706 Latin edition of the Attic Nights by Jakob Gronovius
- Born: c. 125 AD
- Died: c. 180 AD

Aulus Gellius (c. 125 – after 180 AD) was a Roman author and grammarian, who was probably born and certainly brought up in Rome. He was educated in Athens, after which he returned to Rome. He is famous for his Attic Nights, a commonplace book, or compilation of notes on grammar, philosophy, history, antiquarianism, and other subjects, preserving fragments of the works of many authors who might otherwise be unknown today.

== Name ==
Medieval manuscripts of the Noctes Atticae commonly gave the author's name in the form of "Agellius", which is used by Priscian; Lactantius, Servius and Saint Augustine had "A. Gellius" instead. Scholars from the Renaissance onwards hotly debated which one of the two transmitted names is correct (the other one being presumably a corruption) before settling on the latter of the two in modern times.

== Life ==
The only source for the life of Aulus Gellius are the details recorded in his own writings. Internal evidence points to Gellius having been born between AD 125 and 128. He was of good family and connections, and he was probably born and certainly brought up in Rome. He attended the Pythian Games in the year 147, and resided for a considerable period in Athens. Gellius studied rhetoric under Titus Castricius and Sulpicius Apollinaris; philosophy under Calvisius Taurus and Peregrinus Proteus; and enjoyed also the friendship and instruction of Favorinus, Herodes Atticus, and Fronto.

He returned to Rome, where he held a judicial office. He was appointed by the praetor to act as an umpire in civil causes, and much of the time which he would gladly have devoted to literary pursuits was consequently occupied by judicial duties.

== Attic Nights ==
Gellius's only known work is the Attic Nights (Latin: Noctes Atticae), which takes its name from having been begun during the long nights of a winter which he spent in Attica. He afterwards continued it in Rome. It is compiled out of an Adversaria, or commonplace book, in which he had jotted down everything of unusual interest that he heard in conversation or read in books, and it comprises notes on grammar, geometry, philosophy, history and many other subjects. One story is the fable of Androcles, which is often included in compilations of Aesop's fables, but was not originally from that source. Internal evidence led Leofranc Holford-Strevens to date its publication in or after AD 177.

The work, deliberately devoid of sequence or arrangement, is divided into twenty books. All have survived except the eighth, of which only the index survives. The Attic Nights are valuable for the insight they afford into the nature of the society and pursuits of those times, and for its many excerpts from works of lost ancient authors.

The Attic Nights found many readers in antiquity. Writers who used this compilation include Apuleius, Lactantius, Nonius Marcellus, Ammianus Marcellinus, the anonymous author of the Historia Augusta, Servius, and Augustine; but most notable is how Gellius's work was mined by Macrobius, "who, without mentioning his name, quotes Gellius verbatim throughout the Saturnalia, and is thus of the highest value for the text".

=== Editions ===
The editio princeps was published at Rome in 1469 by Giovanni Andrea Bussi, bishop-designate of Aleria. The earliest critical edition was by Ludovicus Carrio in 1585, published by Henricus Stephanus; however, the projected commentary fell victim to personal quarrels. Better known is the critical edition of Johann Friedrich Gronovius; although he devoted his entire life to work on Gellius, he died in 1671 before his work could be completed. His son Jakob published most of his comments on Gellius in 1687, and brought out a revised text with all of his father's comments and other materials at Leyden in 1706; this later work became known as the "Gronoviana". According to Leofranc Holford-Strevens, the "Gronoviana" remained the standard text of Gellius for over a hundred years, until the edition of Martin Hertz (Berlin, 1883–85; there is also a smaller edition by the same author, Berlin, 1886), revised by C. Hosius, 1903, with bibliography. A volume of selections, with notes and vocabulary, was published by Nall (London, 1888). There is an English translation by W. Beloe (London, 1795), and a French translation (1896). A more recent English translation is by John Carew Rolfe (1927) for the Loeb Classical Library. More recently, Peter K. Marshall's edition (Oxford U. Press, 1968, 1990 (reissued with corrections) seems widespread both in print and digital (open access) formats.

=== Translations ===
- The Attic Nights of Aulus Gellius translated into English by the Rev. W. Beloe (London: J. Johnson, 1795), 3 vols. via= HathiTrust; Volume 1; Volume 2; Volume 3.
- George Herbert Nall, ed. (1921). Stories from Aulus Gellius. Elementary classics. London: Macmillan.
- The Attic Nights of Aulus Gellius (Loeb Classical Library). Vol. 1. Translated by Rolfe, John Carew. Cambridge, MA & London: Harvard University Press and William Heinemann. 1927 – via Internet Archive.; volume 2; volume 3

== See also ==
- Ex pede Herculem
- Gellia gens
