= Gaius the Platonist =

Ancient Roman philosopher

Gaius the Platonist was a Middle Platonist philosopher who was active in the early to middle 2nd century AD. Very little is known about him or his philosophical opinions, None of Gaius's work survives, and we have no direct evidence that he ever wrote anything, however, the summaries of his teachings by his students influenced later developments of Neoplatonism. He was the teacher of Albinus, who was the teacher of Galen, and is known to have published a lost nine-volume summary of Gaius' lectures on Plato, which were used by the Neoplatonist philosopher Priscian of Lydia. Porphyry also mentions the works of Gaius were read in the school of Plotinus. It has also been speculated that the On Plato and His Doctrine written by Apuleius may have been taken from the lectures of Gaius, but this assertion is now seen as dubious. The Middle Platonic anonymous commentary on the Theaetetus of Plato, which is partially extant, may also have come from his school.
