= Albinus (philosopher) =

2nd-century Greek philosopher

Albinus (Ancient Greek: Ἀλβίνος; fl. c. 150 AD) was a Platonist philosopher who lived at Smyrna and was a teacher of Galen. A short tract by him, entitled Introduction to Plato's dialogues, has survived.

From the title of one of the extant manuscripts we learn that Albinus was a pupil of Gaius the Platonist. The original title of his work was probably Prologos, and it may have originally formed the initial section of notes taken at the lectures of Gaius. After explaining the nature of the Dialogue, which he compares to a Drama, the writer goes on to divide the Dialogues of Plato into four classes (logical, critical, physical, ethical) and mentions another division of them into Tetralogies, according to their subjects. He advises that the Alcibiades, Phaedo, Republic, and Timaeus should be read in a series.

Some of Albinus's fame is attributed to the fact that a 19th-century German scholar, Jacob Freudenthal, attributed Alcinous's Handbook of Platonism to Albinus. This attribution has since been discredited by the work of John Whittaker in 1974. A critical edition of the Prologos was published in 1999.

Another Albinus is mentioned by Boethius and Cassiodorus, who wrote in Latin some works on music and geometry.
