= Jacob Freudenthal =

German philosopher (1839–1907)

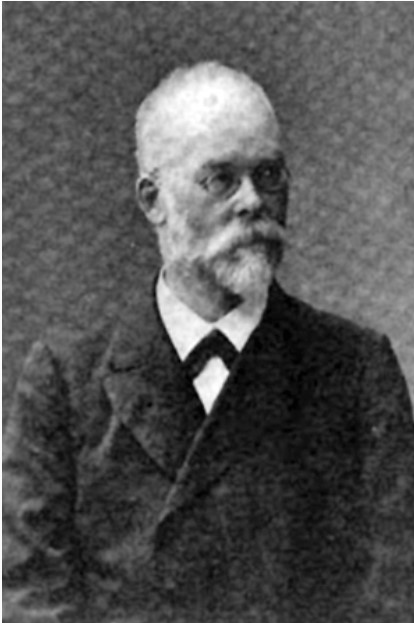
Freudenthal in 1904.

Jacob Freudenthal (20 June 1839 – 1 June 1907) was a German philosopher. He was born at Bodenfelde, Kingdom of Hanover and died at Schreiberhau.

== Life ==
Freudenthal was educated at the universities of Breslau and Göttingen, and at the rabbinical seminary of Breslau. After graduating from the University of Göttingen in 1863, he became a teacher of the Samson-Schule in Wolfenbüttel (1863–64). He then moved to Breslau to teach in the rabbinical seminary there, a position which he resigned in 1888.

In 1875, Freudenthal became a lecturer in philosophy at the University of Breslau. In 1878, he became an assistant professor and in 1888 a full professor of philosophy. He was a member of the senate of the university from 1894 to 1896, and dean of the philosophical faculty in 1898–99.

The Prussian Academy of Science sent him to England in 1888 to study English philosophy, and in 1898 to the Netherlands to research the life of Spinoza. The results of these trips were his "Beiträge zur Englischen Philosophie", published in the Archiv für Geschichte der Philosophie (4-6, 1891), and Die Lebensgeschichte Spinoza's (Leipzig, 1899).

== Works ==
Freudenthal contributed various essays to publications of the Prussian Academy of Sciences, such as:

- to the "Rheinische Museum",
- to the "Archiv für Geschichte der Philosophie",
- to "Hermes",
- to the "J. Q. R.",
- to Monatsschrift Allg. Zeit. des Judenthums"

His other works include:

- Ueber den Begriff der Φαντασία bei Aristoteles, 1863.
- Die Flavius Josephus beigelegte Schrift über die Herrschaft der Vernunft, 1869.
- Alexander Polyhistor und die von ihm erhaltenen Reste judäischer und samaritanischer Geschichtswerke (Hellenistische Studien), 1875 / 1879.
- Ueber die Theologie des Xenophanes, 1886.
- Spinoza. Sein Leben und seine Lehre. Erster Band: Das Leben Spinozas, 1904; Spinoza. Leben und Lehre. Auf Grund des Nachlasses von J. Freudenthal bearbeitet von Carl Gebhardt. 2. edition, Heidelberg: Carl Winter, 1927 (Bibliotheca Spinozana curis societatis Spinozanae; T. 5).
- Über den Text der Lucasschen Biographie Spinozas. In Zeitschrift für Philosophie und philosophische Kritik 126 (1905), 189–208.
