= Middle Platonism =

Stage of philosophy development

Middle Platonism was a revival and outgrowth of Platonic philosophy from about 90 BC – when Antiochus of Ascalon rejected the skepticism of the new Academy – until the development of Neoplatonism under Plotinus in the 3rd century. Middle Platonism absorbed many doctrines from the rival Peripatetic and Stoic schools. The pre-eminent philosopher in this period, Plutarch (c. 45–120), defended the freedom of the will and the immortality of the soul. He sought to show that God, in creating the world, had transformed matter, as the receptacle of evil, into the divine soul of the world, where it continued to operate as the source of all evil. God is a transcendent being, who operates through divine intermediaries, which are the gods and daemons of popular religion. Numenius of Apamea (c. 160) combined Platonism with Neopythagoreanism and other eastern philosophies, in a move which would prefigure the development of Neoplatonism.

== History ==
Antiochus of Ascalon (c. 125–68 BC), was the pupil of Philo of Larissa, and the teacher of Cicero. Through his influence, Platonism made the transition from Academic skepticism to Eclecticism. Whereas Philo had still adhered to the doctrine that there is nothing absolutely certain, Antiochus returned to a pronounced dogmatism. Among other objections to Academic scepticism was the consideration that without firm convictions no rational content of life is possible. He argued that it is self-contradictory to claim that nothing can be asserted or to attempt to prove that nothing can be proved; likewise, one cannot speak of false ideas while simultaneously denying the distinction between the false and the true. He expounded the Academic, Peripatetic, and Stoic systems in such a way as to show that these three schools deviate from one another only in minor points. He himself was chiefly interested in ethics, in which he tried to find a middle way between Zeno, Aristotle, and Plato. For instance, he said that virtue suffices for happiness, but for the highest grade of happiness bodily and external goods are necessary as well.

This eclectic tendency was favoured by the lack of dogmatic works by Plato. Middle Platonism was promoted by the necessity of considering the main theories of the post-Platonic schools of philosophy, such as the Aristotelian logic and the Stoic psychology and ethics (theory of goods and emotions). On the one hand the middle Platonists were engaged like the later Peripatetics in scholarly activities such as the exposition of Plato's doctrines and the explanation of his dialogues; on the other hand they attempted to develop the Platonic theories systematically. In so far as it was subject in this to the influence of Neopythagoreanism, it was of considerable importance in preparing the way for Neoplatonism.

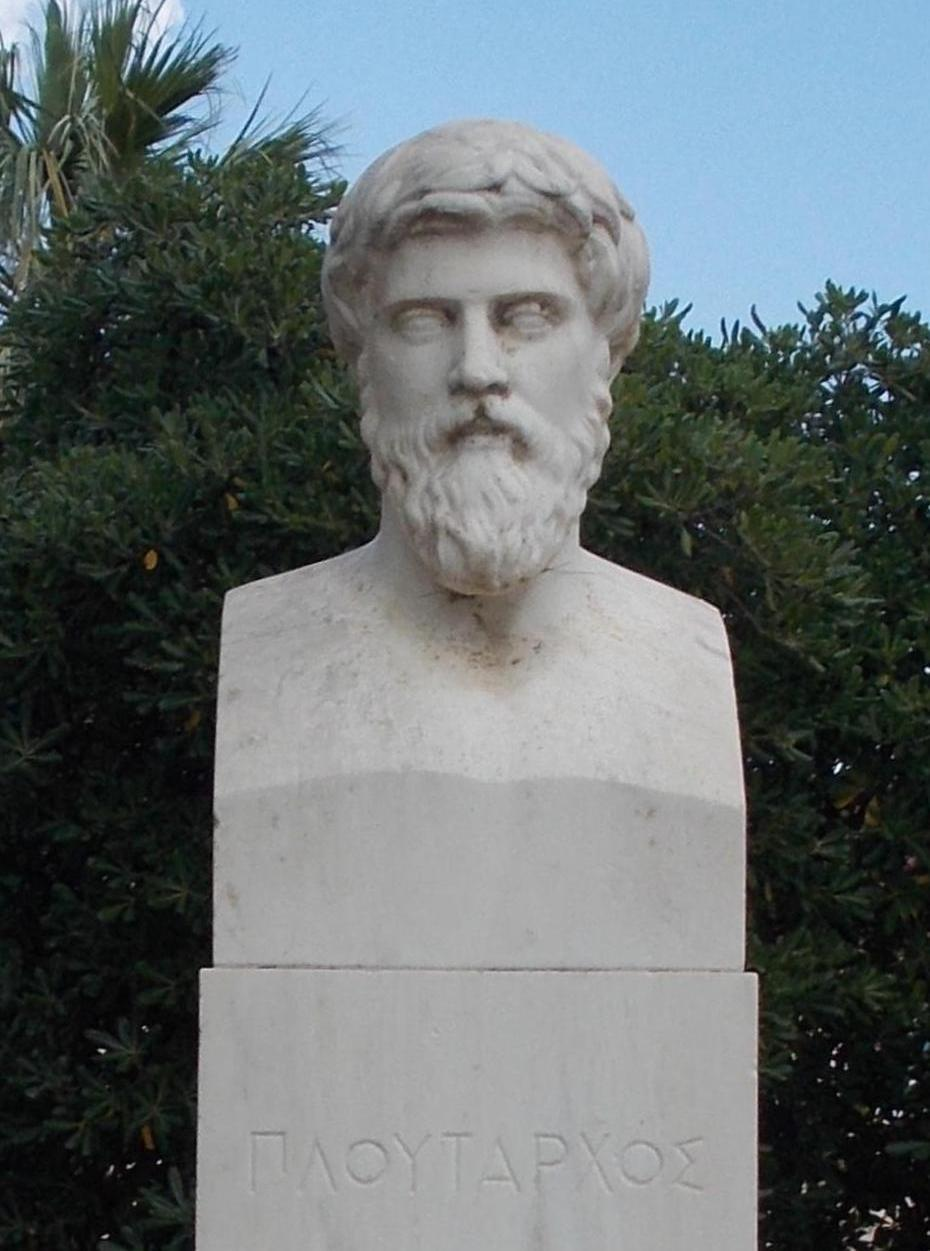
Plutarch

The most important of the middle Platonists was Plutarch (45–120), who also won fame as a historian. Although he was a Platonist, he was open to the influence of the Peripatetics, and even, in some details, to the Stoics, despite his polemics against their principles; he absolutely rejected only Epicureanism. In opposition to Stoic materialism and Epicurean "atheism," he cherished a pure idea of God that was more in accordance with Plato. Nevertheless, he adopted a second principle in order to explain the constitution of the physical world. This principle he sought not in any indeterminate matter, but in the evil world-soul which had from the beginning been bound up with matter, but in the creation was filled with reason and arranged by it. Thus it was transformed into the divine soul of the world, but continued to operate as the source of all evil. He elevated God above the finite world, but he believed that God comes to our aid by direct revelations; this enabled Plutarch to justify popular belief in prophecy. The gods of popular religion are merely different names for one and the same divine Being and the powers that serve them. Daemons were for him agents of God's influence on the world. Plutarch defended freedom of the will and the immortality of the soul. Platonic-Peripatetic ethics were upheld by Plutarch against the opposing theories of the Stoics and Epicureans.

Among later middle Platonists there were Theon of Smyrna, who wrote a mathematical introduction to Plato, and Gaius (2nd century) who was a teacher of Platonist philosophy. His pupil, Albinus, wrote an account of his lectures, of which we possess the introduction. Around the same time, Alcinous wrote an extant treatise on Platonism, in which he postulated three principles: the first God, the ideas, which are regarded as thoughts of this "first God", and matter. Apuleius (c. 125), a popular writer, expounded an eclectic Platonism in his books On the God of Socrates and On Plato and his Doctrine, which are written in Latin. Maximus of Tyre (c. 180), like Plutarch, endeavoured to bridge the gulf between a transcendent God and matter by the assumption of numerous daemons as intermediaries. Atticus (c. 175) opposed the eclecticism which had invaded the school and contested the theories of Aristotle as an aberration from Plato. He was an uncompromising supporter of Plato and regarded the theory of immortality as the basis of his whole system. Nevertheless, in this theology he approached more closely to the Stoic idea of immanence.

Numenius of Apamea (c. 160) combined both Neopythagoreanism and Platonism. He exhibited a far-going syncretism. Like Plutarch he supposed that an evil soul was combined with matter. From this the mortal part of the human soul is derived, which he described as the second irrational soul. Because of its guilt the soul had to descend from its bodiless life into the body, and after its departure from the body, if it does not need to undergo further incarnation, it becomes indistinguishably united with God. A gift of God is the wisdom which is the highest good, and this gift is only granted to those who devote themselves to the ultimate good to the exclusion of all other thoughts.

== See also ==
- Allegorical interpretations of Plato

== Bibliography ==
- Zeller, Eduard (1931), Outlines of the History of Greek Philosophy (13th ed.).
