= Philosophical commentary =

A philosophical commentary is a written exposition and analysis of an authoritative philosophical text.

A large portion of the schools of thought was originated through the analysis that different commentators carried out on renowned philosophical texts, especially texts from Plato and Aristotle. A significant portion of Thomas Aquinas's philosophical ideas were the result of commentaries to some of Aristotle's ideas.

== Examples ==
- Commentaries on Plato
- Commentaries on Aristotle
- Commentary on Anatomy in Avicenna's Canon
- Commentary on the Book of Causes
