= Jean Denis =

Jean Denis may refer to:

- Jean Denis (politician) (1902–1992), Belgian politician and writer
- Jean Denys, also spelled Jean Denis (c.1635–1704), physician notable for having performed the first fully documented human blood transfusion, a xenotransfusion
- Jean-Denis, a given name
