= Jean-Denis =

Jean-Denis is a masculine given name, and may refer to:

- Jean Denis Attiret (1702–1768), French painter and missionary
- Jean-Denis Bredin (1929–2021), French attorney
- Jean-Denis Cochin (1726–1783), French priest
- Jean-Denis Constant (born 1955), French table tennis player
- Jean-Denis Délétraz (born 1963), Swiss racecar driver
- Jean-Denis Garon (born 1982), Canadian politician
- Jean-Denis Gauthier (1810–1872), Franco-Vietnamese bishop
- Jean-Denis Girard (born 1967), Canadian politician
- Jean-Denis Jaussaud (born 1962), French cross-country skier
- Jean-Denis Lanjuinais (1753–1827), French politician, historian and nobleman
- Jean-Denis Lejeune (born 1959), Belgian protester
- Jean-Denis de Montlovier (1733–1804), French man of letters

== See also ==
- Jean Denis (politician) (1902–1992), a Belgian politician and writer
- Jean Denys, also spelled Jean Denis (c.1635–1704), physician notable for having performed the first fully documented human blood transfusion, a xenotransfusion
