= Clauberg =

Clauberg is a German surname. Notable people with the surname include:

- Carl Clauberg (1898–1957), German Nazi physician who participated in criminal medical experiments
- Claus Clauberg (1890–1963), German musician and composer
- Johannes Clauberg (1622–1665), German theologian and philosopher
- Karl Wilhelm Clauberg (1893−1985), German bacteriologist
