= Pierre-Sylvain Régis =

French Cartesian philosopher

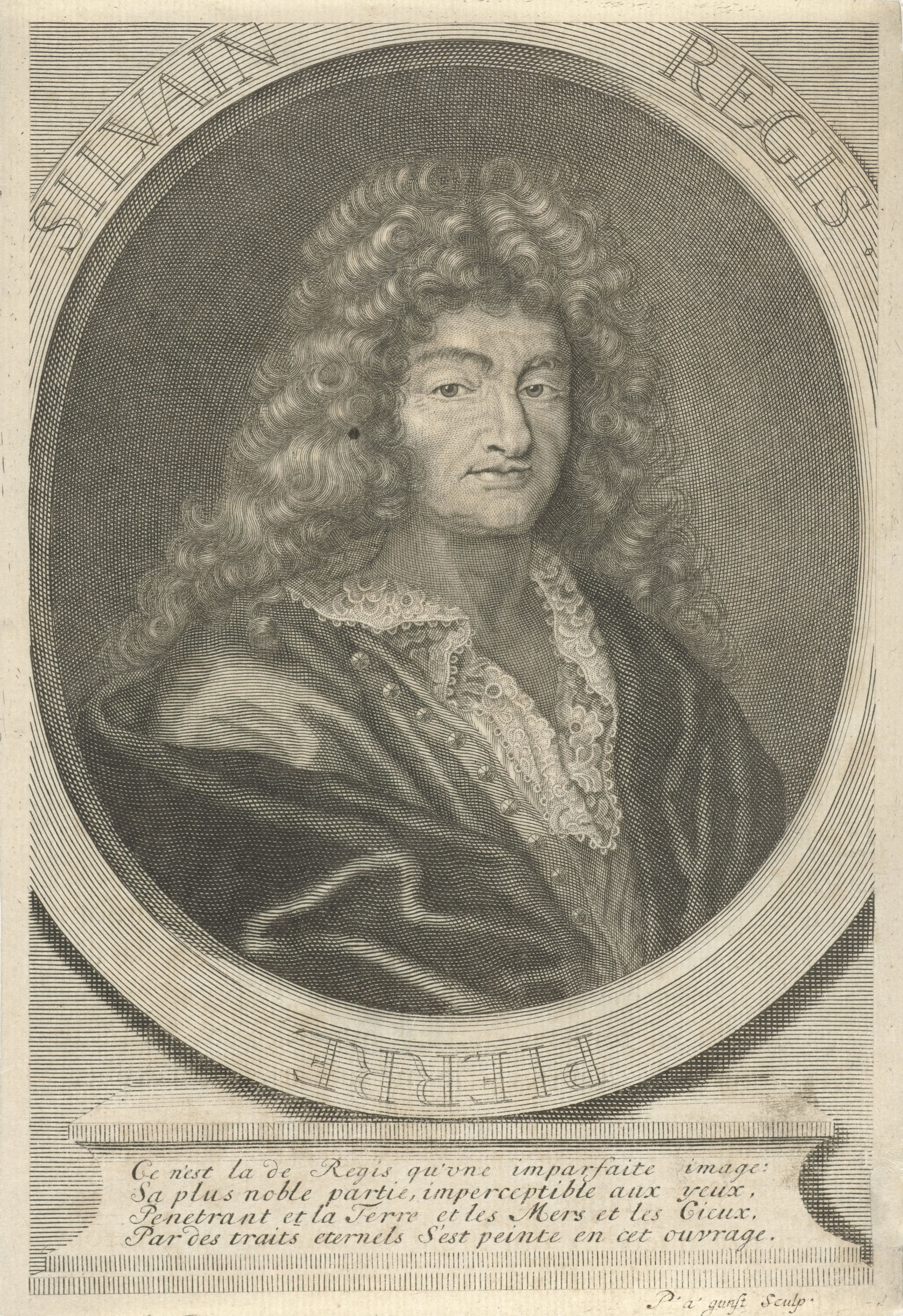
- Born: 1632; La Salvetat de Blanquefort, France
- Died: 1707 (aged 74–75); Paris, France

Education
- Education: University of Paris
- Academic advisor: Jacques Rohault

Philosophical work
- Era: Age of Enlightenment
- Region: Western philosophy
- School: Cartesianism
- Institutions: French Academy of Sciences
- Main interests: Metaphysics

Pierre-Sylvain Régis (French: [pjɛʁ silvɛ̃ ʁeʒis]; 1632–1707) was a French Cartesian philosopher and a prominent critic of Spinoza. Known as a philosopher, he was elected to the French Academy of Sciences in 1699.

== Life ==
Born in La Salvetat de Blanquefort, near Agen, he had a classical education, and then went to Paris. He attended the lectures of Jacques Rohault and became a follower of the philosophy of René Descartes. He then taught the principles of Cartesianism in the cities of Toulouse (1665), Aigues-Mortes, Montpellier (1671), and Paris (1680). The prohibition issued against the teaching of Cartesianism put an end to his lectures.

Régis was elected a member of the Academy of Sciences in 1699. He died in Paris in 1707.

== Works ==
His major work was his Cours entier de philosophie ou Système général selon les principles de Descartes (3 vols., Paris, 1690), where he presented in a systematic way the principles of Cartesian philosophy. Opposed to Malebranche's idealism, against which he wrote in the Journal des Savants (1693 and 1694), Régis modified the system of Descartes on various points in the direction of empiricism. He denied that the human soul has innate and eternal ideas, maintained that all ideas are modifications of the soul united to the body, and that the body and extension can be known as immediately as the soul and thought.

The Cours was criticized by Pierre Daniel Huet and the Parisian Professor Jean Duhamel. Régis then wrote Réponse au livre qui a pour titre Censura philosophiæ Cartesianæ (Paris, 1691), and Réponse aux reflexions critique de M. Duhamel sur le système cartésian de M. Régis (Paris, 1692). Among his other works were Usage de la raison et de la foi, ou l'accord de la raison et de la foi, with a Réfutation de l'opinion de Spinoza, touchant l'existence et la nature de Dieu.
