= Jacques Rohault =

French philosopher, physicist and mathematician

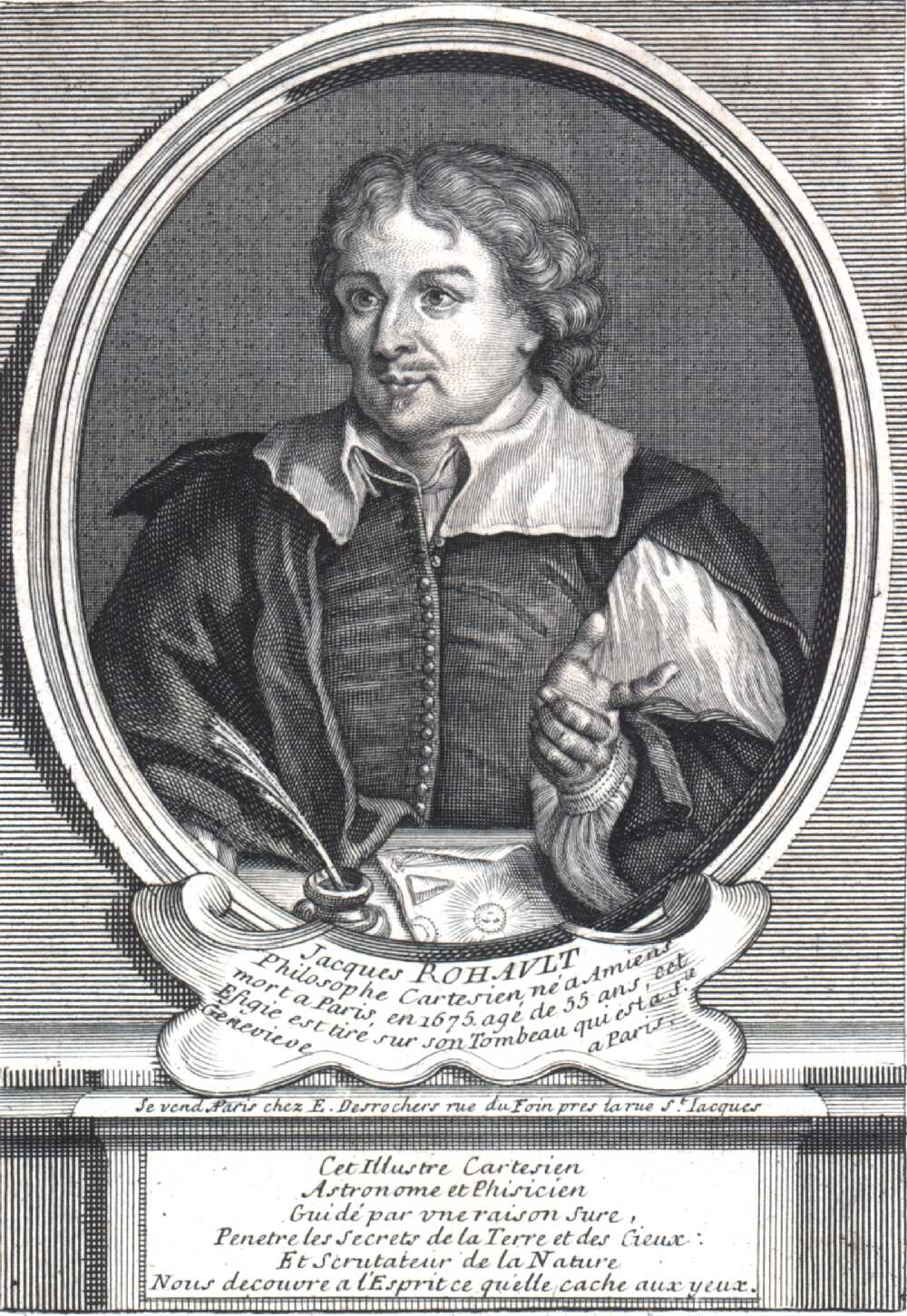
Engraving of French physicist Jacques Rohault

Jacques Rohault (French: [ʁo.o]; 1618 – 27 December 1672) was a French philosopher, physicist and mathematician, and a follower of Cartesianism.

== Life ==
Rohault was born in Amiens, the son of a wealthy wine merchant, and educated in Paris. Having grown up with the conventional scholastic philosophy of his day, he adopted and popularised the new Cartesian physics. His Wednesday lectures in Paris became celebrated; they began in the 1650s, and attracted in particular Pierre-Sylvain Régis.

Rohault died in Paris on December 27, 1672.

== Works ==
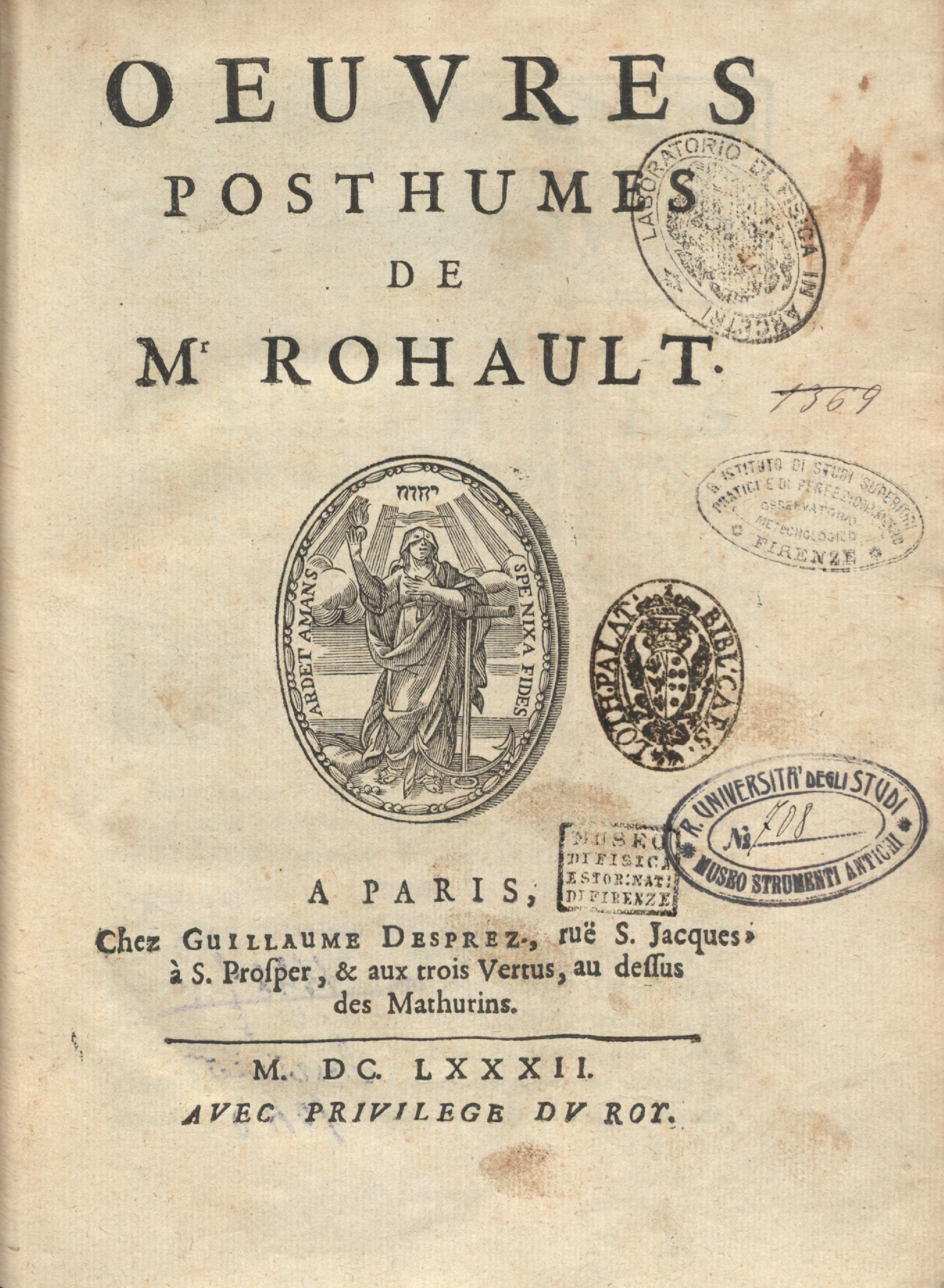
Oeuvres posthumes, 1682

Rohault held to the mechanical philosophy, and gave qualified support to its "corpuscular" or atomic form of explanation, assuming that "small figured bodies" were the underlying physical reality. His Traité de physique (Paris, 1671) became a standard textbook for half a century. It followed the precedent set by Henricus Regius in separating physics from metaphysics. It also included the theory of gravitation of Christiaan Huygens, given in terms of an experiment. The translation of Samuel Clarke (initially into Latin) gained an independent status, and numerous editions, through its annotations that purported to correct it with reference to the theories of Isaac Newton. Rohault's experimental orientation remained popular, despite the criticisms of his theories.

The Traité referred to a model of the eye that Rohault had worked on. A wide range of experiments used by Rohault included some mentioned by Descartes, and two well-known ones of Blaise Pascal, but also others taken from medical men: Gaspard Asselli, Louis Gayant, William Harvey, Jean Pecquet, and Nicholas Steno.
