= Nicolas Malebranche =

French priest and rationalist philosopher (1638–1715)

The Reverend Nicolas Malebranche CO
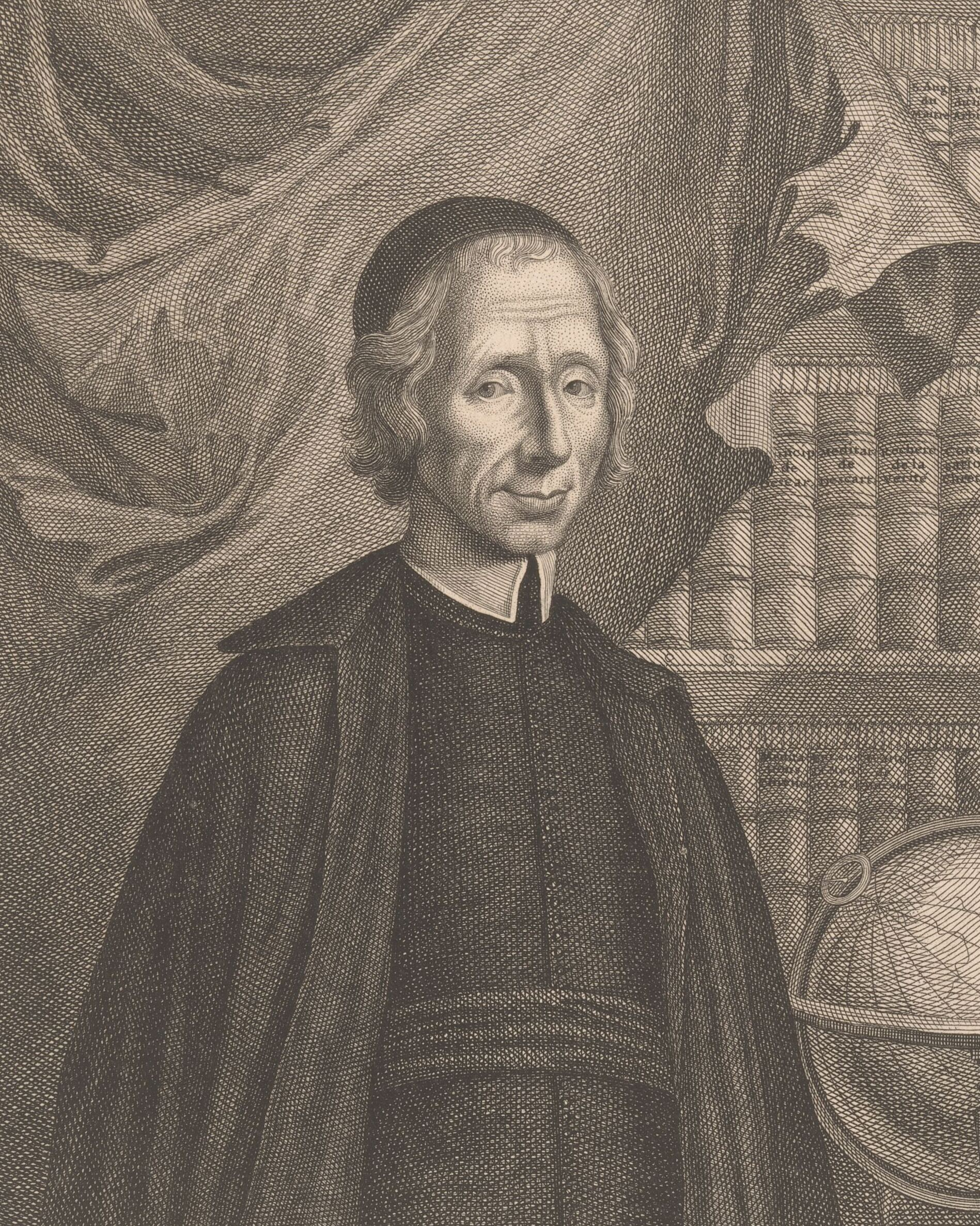
- Portrait, c. 1707
- Born: 6 August 1638; Paris, Kingdom of France
- Died: 13 October 1715 (aged 77); Paris, Kingdom of France

Education
- Education: University of Paris (Collège de la Marche and Collège de Sorbonne)
- Academic advisor: André Martin

Philosophical work
- Era: 17th-century philosophy
- Region: Western philosophy
- School: Rationalism; Cartesianism; Augustinianism
- Main interests: Metaphysics, epistemology
- Notable ideas: Synthesis of the philosophies of St. Augustine and Descartes, occasionalism, ontologism, theodicy, vision in God, intelligible extension

Nicolas Malebranche (Note: /mælˈbrɒnʃ/ mal-BRONSH; French: [nikɔla malbʁɑ̃ʃ];) (6 August 1638 – 13 October 1715) was a French Oratorian Catholic priest and rationalist philosopher. In his works, he sought to synthesise the thought of St. Augustine and Descartes, in order to demonstrate the active role of God in every aspect of the world. Malebranche is best known for his doctrines of vision in God, occasionalism and ontologism.

== Biography ==
=== Early years ===
Malebranche was born in Paris in 1638, the youngest child of Nicolas Malebranche, secretary to King Louis XIII, and Catherine de Lauzon, sister of Jean de Lauson, a Governor of New France. Because of a malformed spine, Malebranche received his elementary education from a private tutor. He left home at the age of sixteen to pursue a course of philosophy at the Collège de la Marche, and subsequently to study theology at the Collège de Sorbonne, both colleges from the University of Paris. He eventually left the Sorbonne, having rejected scholasticism, and entered the Oratory in 1660. There, he devoted himself to ecclesiastical history, linguistics, the Bible, and the works of Saint Augustine. Malebranche was ordained a priest in 1664.

In 1664, Malebranche first read Descartes' Treatise on Man, an account of the physiology of the human body. Malebranche's biographer, Father Yves André reported that Malebranche was influenced by Descartes' book because it allowed him to view the natural world without Aristotelian scholasticism. Malebranche spent the next decade studying Cartesianism.

=== Philosophical career ===
In 1674–75, Malebranche published the two volumes of his first and most extensive philosophical work. Entitled Concerning the Search after Truth. In which is treated the nature of the human mind and the use that must be made of it to avoid error in the sciences (French: De la recherche de la vérité. Où l'on traite de la Nature de l'Esprit de l'homme, et de l'usage qu'il en doit faire pour éviter l'erreur dans les Sciences), the book laid the foundation for Malebranche's philosophical reputation and ideas. It dealt with the causes of human error and on how to avoid such mistakes. Most importantly, in the third book, which discussed pure understanding, he defended a claim that the ideas through which we perceive objects exist in God.

Malebranche's first critic was the Abbé Simon Foucher, who attacked the Search even before its second volume had been published. Malebranche replied in a short preface added to that second volume, and then, in the 1678 third edition, he added 50% to the already considerable size of the book with a sequence of (eventually) seventeen Elucidations. These responded to further criticisms, but they also expanded on the original arguments, and developed them in new ways. In the Tenth Elucidation, for instance, Malebranche introduced his theory of "intelligible extension", a single, archetypal idea of extension into which the ideas of all particular kinds of bodies could be jointly resolved. In others, Malebranche placed a greater emphasis than he had previously done on his occasionalist account of causation, and particularly on his contention that God acted for the most part through "general volitions" and only rarely, as in the case of miracles, through "particular volitions".

Malebranche expanded on this last point in 1680 when he published Treatise on Nature and Grace. Here, he made it explicit that the generality of the laws whereby God regulated His behaviour extended not only to His activity in the natural world but also applied to His gift of grace to human beings. The book was attacked by fellow Cartesian philosopher Antoine Arnauld, and, although Arnauld's initial concerns were theological ones, the bitter dispute which ensued very quickly branched out into most other areas of their respective systems. Over the next few years, the two men wrote enough polemics against one another to fill four volumes of Malebranche's collected works and three of Arnauld's. Arnauld's supporters managed to persuade the Roman Catholic Church to place Nature and Grace on its Index of Prohibited Books in 1690, and it was followed there by the Search nineteen years later. (Ironically, the Index already contained several works by the Jansenist Arnauld himself.) Other critics with whom Malebranche entered into significant discussion include another fellow Cartesian, Pierre Sylvain Regis, as well as Dortous de Mairan. De Mairan was sympathetic to the views of Baruch Spinoza, and felt that he had found similar views in his reading of Malebranche: Malebranche assiduously resisted such an association.

=== Timeline ===
- 1638 - Born in Paris to Nicolas Malebranche and Catherine de Lauzon.
- 1654 - Enters the Collège de la Marche and later the Sorbonne to study philosophy and theology.
- 1660 - Ordained as a member of the French Oratory.
- 1664 - First reads Descartes' Treatise on Man and spends the next ten years studying philosophy.
- 1674–75 - Publishes The Search After Truth.
- 1678 - Adds Elucidations to new edition of the Search.
- 1680 - Publishes Treatise of Nature and Grace.
- 1683 - Publishes Christian and Metaphysical Meditations. Arnauld publishes On True and False Ideas, the opening salvo in their dispute.
- 1684 - Publishes Treatise on Ethics.
- 1688 - Publishes Dialogues on Metaphysics and Religion (Dialogues on Metaphysics and Religion).
- 1690 - Treatise of Nature and Grace is placed on the Index of Prohibited Books.
- 1694 - Death of Arnauld.
- 1708 - Publishes Dialogue Between a Christian Philosopher and a Chinese Philosopher.
- 1709 - The Search After Truth is also placed on the Index.
- 1713–14 - Correspondence with Jean-Jacques d'Ortous de Mairan on Spinozism.
- 1715 - Malebranche dies.

== Philosophy ==
=== Vision in God ===
Just as all human action (along with the action of any other creature) is entirely dependent on God, so too is all human cognition. Malebranche argued that human knowledge is dependent on divine understanding in a way analogous to that in which the motion of bodies is dependent on divine will. Like René Descartes, Malebranche held that humans attain knowledge through ideas – immaterial representations present to the mind. But whereas Descartes believed ideas are mental entities, Malebranche argued that all ideas exist only in God. These ideas, therefore, are uncreated and independent of finite minds. When we access them intellectually, we apprehend objective truth. Malebranche defined "truth" as a relation between ideas: since these ideas are in God, they are eternal and immutable, and consequently the only truths worthy of the name will themselves be eternal and immutable. Malebranche divided these relations between ideas into two categories: relations of magnitude and relations of quality or perfection. The former constitute "speculative" truths, such as those of geometry, while the latter constitute the "practical" truths of ethics. Ethical principles, for Malebranche, are therefore divine in their foundation, universal in their application, and to be discovered by intellectual contemplation, just as geometrical principles are.

With regard to this account of intellectual knowledge, Malebranche was more or less following Saint Augustine. His great innovation was to explain how these same divine ideas could also serve as the immediate objects of human minds in sensual perception. The problem there is that the divine ideas are universal, whereas all perception seems to be of particulars. Malebranche's solution was to suggest that, whereas the mind's intellectual conception of these ideas is pure and direct, its sensual perception of them will be modified by "sensations". These sensations, unlike the ideas, are indeed proper to individual created minds, and subsist as modes thereof. The idea will represent only the geometrical or mechanical properties of bodies (size, shape, motion), while the sensation will consist in colour or some other sensible quality. The latter will limit the mind's apprehension of the former in such a manner as to make it represent a particular individual to that mind. To a different mind, one with a different sensation, the same idea could represent a different individual of the same general kind. In the Dialogues On Metaphysics And Religion (dialogue 1), Malebranche added that the same basic structure can also account for (the mental as opposed to the physiological element in) imagination, in this case where the idea only "lightly touches" the mind.

Malebranche was strongly influenced by Descartes but did not accept his philosophy uncritically. He is noted particularly for his view that we see all things in God and for his adoption of psycho-physical parallelism and 'occasionalism' to deal with the problem of interaction between mind and body. However, his attribution of epistemological and explanatory primacy to God leads to difficulties.

(1) If we see all things in God in the sense that He puts the ideas into our minds we can have no direct knowledge of the external world. We can appeal to clear and distinct ideas as a criterion for the veridicality of judgements about physical things, but it is God who is ultimately responsible for our ideas.

(2) If all things are under the direct control of God, subject to His will, what of human freedom? Malebranche's view that we have freedom to choose but only in relation to finite goods is not convincing, denying as it does the possibility of resistance of movement towards God as the universal good. (This may be a misrepresentation of Malebranche's view; see the first chapter of The Search for Truth, where he specifies that while we cannot but desire the good in general, we are free to apply that love to particulars, and can do so in a disordered fashion that leads to sin. His account is no different from St. Augustine's in this regard.)

(3) In so far as God is not to be identified with the archetypal eternal truths in his mind, Malebranche is not a pantheist. But, as in mediaeval philosophy, this gives rise to the problem of reconciling God's freedom with His supposed immutability.

=== Theodicy ===
Malebranche's theodicy is his solution to the problem of evil. Although he conceded that God had the power to create a more perfect world, free from all defects, such a world would have necessitated a greater complexity in divine ways. Thus, God produces the natural evils that follow from simple laws not because he wills those particular effects, but because he wills a world that best reflects his wisdom by achieving the best possible balance between the intrinsic perfection of the work and the simplicity and generality of its laws.

=== Malebranche's dualism ===
Whereas Malebranche followed Augustine in his description of intellectual knowledge, in his approach to mind–body problems he began as a follower of Descartes. But in contrast to Descartes, who considered it possible to form a clear and distinct idea of the mind, Malebranche argues in the Dialogues on Metaphysics, a dialogue between Theodore and Aristes, that we do not have a complete conception of the powers of the mind, and thus no clear conception of the nature of the mind.

I am unable, when I turn to myself, to recognize any of my faculties or my capacities. The inner sensation which I have of myself informs me that I am, that I think, that I will, that I have sensory awareness, that I suffer, and so on; but it provides me with no knowledge whatever of what I am – of the nature of my thought, my sensations, my passions, or my pain – or of the mutual relations that obtain between all these things. ...I have no idea whatever of my soul.

This leads Theodore to declare that 'I am not my own light to myself'; the nature of our own minds is highly obscure. What is more, with regard to psycho-physical interaction, Malebranche argues that body could not act on mind, nor mind on body. The only active power (hence the only efficient cause of change in the world) is God. When I will that my arm should rise, my volition is the "occasion" or the "occasional cause" of the movement of my arm; the efficient cause of both my volition and the movement of my arm is God. Malebranche's doctrine, which could be found in contemporary commentaries on Aristotle, and which first appeared in certain Arab philosophers, is therefore called "occasionalism".

=== Occasionalism ===
In general, occasionalism is the view that there are no efficient causes in the full sense other than God. Created things are at best "occasions" for divine activity. Bodies and minds act neither on themselves nor on each other; God alone brings about all the phenomena of nature and the mind. Changes occurring in created things will exhibit regularities (and will thus satisfy a Humean definition of causation) because God in creating the world observes what Malebranche calls "order": he binds himself to act according to laws of nature chosen in accordance with his general will that the world be as good as possible, and thus (for example) that the laws be simple and few in number.

In particular, there will be laws governing what we would customarily call the "interaction" of body and mind, so that similar movements in the body will "occasion" similar ideas in the mind. That relation has some features of the causal relation (it satisfies, for example, universal conditionals of the form "Whenever C occurs, E occurs"). But in reality both the idea in the mind and the movement in the body are caused by God.

== Scientific contributions ==
Although better known for his philosophical work, Malebranche made some notable contributions to physics, working within a broadly Cartesian framework but nevertheless prepared to depart from Descartes where necessary. In 1699, he delivered an address to the Académie Royale des Sciences on the nature of light and color, wherein he argued that different colors resulted out of different frequencies in the pressure vibrations of subtle matter, much as different musical tones derived from different frequencies in the vibrations of air. His theory was presented as a corrective to Descartes' view, rather than a refutation thereof, but it has important parallels with the rival optical theory of Isaac Newton. Newton had already developed his position some thirty years earlier, but Malebranche probably would not have been aware of it until it was finally published in the Opticks of 1704, or, more likely, in its Latin translation of 1706. When Malebranche revised his 1699 paper for inclusion as the Sixteenth Elucidation of the 1712 edition of The Search After Truth, he inserted a number of references to "Newton's excellent work".

In addition, Malebranche wrote on the laws of motion, a topic he discussed extensively with Leibniz. He also wrote on mathematics and, although he made no major mathematical discoveries of his own, he was instrumental in introducing and disseminating the contributions of Descartes and Leibniz in France. Malebranche introduced l'Hôpital to Johann Bernoulli, with the ultimate result being the publication of the first textbook in infinitesimal calculus.

Malebranche also developed an original theory related to preformationism, postulating that each embryo probably contained even smaller embryos ad infinitum, like an idealized Matryoshka doll. According to Malebranche, "an infinite series of plants and animals were contained within the seed or the egg, but only naturalists with sufficient skill and experience could detect their presence" (Magner 158–9).

== Legacy ==
Aside, perhaps, from John Norris (who, in any case, drew at least as much from Malebranche's own sources, primarily Saint Augustine, as he did from Malebranche himself), there are few if any philosophers who can be considered faithful followers of Malebranche in all matters. He was, however, held in widespread high regard within his own lifetime and for some time afterwards, and the influence of certain of his ideas can be discerned in the works of several important figures.

Pierre Bayle regarded Malebranche as "one of the greatest philosophers of this age" (though, admittedly, not as the greatest, as is often reported). In note H to his "Zeno of Elea" article, Bayle discussed Malebranche's views on material substance with particular approval. Occasionalism and the vision in God seem to make the real existence of material substance redundant. Not only is it unable to be directly perceived, but it cannot actually affect us or anything else in any way at all. Descartes had also maintained that matter was not directly perceivable, but he had argued that the veracity of God could support a proof of its certain existence. Malebranche, however, weakened Descartes' argument, concluding that, from a philosophical point of view, its existence could only be shown to be probable. Bayle pushed even further down this same path, thereby laying much of the ground work for the immaterialism of George Berkeley. Berkeley, influenced both by Bayle and directly by Malebranche himself, simply took the final step to a full denial of the existence of material substance. (Arthur Collier, who was also influenced directly by Malebranche, and by Norris, made the same move at around the same time as Berkeley did, but, it would appear, entirely independently of him.) Berkeley, admittedly, did reject the theory of vision in God. "It is evident", he insisted, "that the things I perceive are my own ideas." But he was influenced by Malebranche's occasionalism, even though he excluded the activity of created minds from its domain. In addition, Berkeley agreed with Malebranche, against Descartes, that we could not achieve a clear idea of the mind itself. John Locke had also argued for this, but he had made no distinction between minds and bodies on this point, whereas both Berkeley and Malebranche maintained (each in his own way) that we could have ideas of bodies but not of minds.

Gottfried Wilhelm Leibniz (who met Malebranche in Paris in about 1675 and corresponded with him thereafter) also rejected the vision in God, and his theory of pre-established harmony was designed as a new alternative to occasionalism as well as to the more traditional theory of efficient causal interaction. However, in his own theodicy, even if it was somewhat more elaborate than Malebranche's, he did at least agree with Malebranche's fundamental contention that the simplicity of God's ways had to be given as much regard as the world's perfection.

David Hume supported and drew upon Malebranche's negative arguments to show that no genuine causal connections could be conceived between distinct mundane entities. However, when it came to finding a positive replacement for such causal connections, he turned inwards to the workings of the human mind, instead of turning upwards to God. With regard to this second half of Malebranche's occasionalism, Hume wrote:

We are got into fairy land, long ere we have reached the last steps of our theory. ...Our line is too short to fathom such immense abysses.

Hume's empiricist epistemology led him to distrust Malebranche's confidence in discovering abstruse metaphysical truths through an intellectual union with God. Likewise, Locke felt that Malebranche's metaphysical speculations lacked a proper foundation, and, though ingenious, were ultimately unintelligible. In a somewhat similar manner, Arthur Schopenhauer regarded the theory of vision in God as "explaining something unknown by something even more unknown."

Locke withheld his "An Examination of P[ère] Malebranche's Opinion Of Seeing All Things In God" from publication, "because he looked upon it to be an opinion that would not spread but was like to die of itself, or at least to do no great harm." Much as Locke predicted, Malebranche's reputation outside France (where he always enjoyed high esteem) did begin to diminish during the 18th century, and remained low thereafter. However, over the last three or four decades, Malebranche's work has drawn renewed and ever-increasing interest. Several of his works have been translated into English for the first time, as scholars have been reassessing his ideas. Many have begun to argue that the originality and unity of his philosophical system merits him a place alongside such figures as Descartes, Spinoza, and Leibniz.

== Bibliography ==
Works in English

- The Search after Truth and Elucidations, eds. Thomas M. Lennon and Paul J. Olscamp. (Cambridge: Cambridge University Press, 1997). First published, with Philosophical Commentary, by Ohio State University Press, 1980.
- Dialogues on Metaphysics and Religion, eds. Nicholas Jolley and David Scott. (Cambridge: Cambridge University Press, 1997). Supersedes 1923 translation by Morris Ginsberg.
- Treatise on Nature and Grace, tr. Patrick Riley. (Oxford: Clarendon Press, 1992).
- Philosophical Selections, ed. Steven Nadler. (Indianapolis: Hackett Publishing Company, 1992). Contains selections (some in alternative translations) from above three works.
- Treatise on Ethics, tr. Craig Walton. (Dordrecht: Kluwer Academic Publishers, 1993).
- Dialogue between a Christian Philosopher and a Chinese Philosopher on the Existence and Nature of God, tr. Dominick A. Iorio. (University Press of America, 1980).
- Correspondence with Dortous de Mairan, in Malebranche's First and Last Critics, tr. Richard A. Watson and Marjorie Grene. (Carbondale and Edwardsville: Southern Illinois University Press, 1995).

The Thomas Taylor translation of the Search (1694; second edition 1700) includes material not contained in the Lennon and Olscamp edition (which is based on the 1712 version of the text). It is bound with Malebranche's Defence against the Accusation of M. de la Ville, which has not been available in English at all since the seventeenth century. The Treatise of Nature and Grace is also included in the same volume. Rival translations of all three of these works were also published by Richard Sault in 1694–95. In addition, the Conversations chrétiennes were translated in 1695 as Christian Conferences... to which is added, Meditations on Humility and Repentance: this work has also been unavailable in English since the seventeenth century.

The standard edition of Malebranche's works in French is the Œuvres Complètes, ed. André Robinet, twenty volumes (Paris: J. Vrin, 1958–78).

== See also ==
- List of Catholic clergy scientists
