= 1665 =

1665 in various calendars
- Gregorian calendar: 1665; MDCLXV
- Ab urbe condita: 2418
- Armenian calendar: 1114; ԹՎ ՌՃԺԴ
- Assyrian calendar: 6415
- Balinese saka calendar: 1586–1587
- Bengali calendar: 1071–1072
- Berber calendar: 2615
- English Regnal year: 16 Cha. 2 – 17 Cha. 2
- Buddhist calendar: 2209
- Burmese calendar: 1027
- Byzantine calendar: 7173–7174
- Chinese calendar: 甲辰年 (Wood Dragon); 4362 or 4155 — to — 乙巳年 (Wood Snake); 4363 or 4156
- Coptic calendar: 1381–1382
- Discordian calendar: 2831
- Ethiopian calendar: 1657–1658
- Hebrew calendar: 5425–5426
- Hindu calendars
- Vikram Samvat: 1721–1722
- Shaka Samvat: 1586–1587
- Kali Yuga: 4765–4766
- Holocene calendar: 11665
- Igbo calendar: 665–666
- Iranian calendar: 1043–1044
- Islamic calendar: 1075–1076
- Japanese calendar: Kanbun 5 (寛文５年)
- Javanese calendar: 1587–1588
- Julian calendar: Gregorian minus 10 days
- Korean calendar: 3998
- Minguo calendar: 247 before ROC 民前247年
- Nanakshahi calendar: 197
- Thai solar calendar: 2207–2208
- Tibetan calendar: ཤིང་ཕོ་འབྲུག་ལོ་ (male Wood-Dragon); 1791 or 1410 or 638 — to — ཤིང་མོ་སྦྲུལ་ལོ་ (female Wood-Snake); 1792 or 1411 or 639

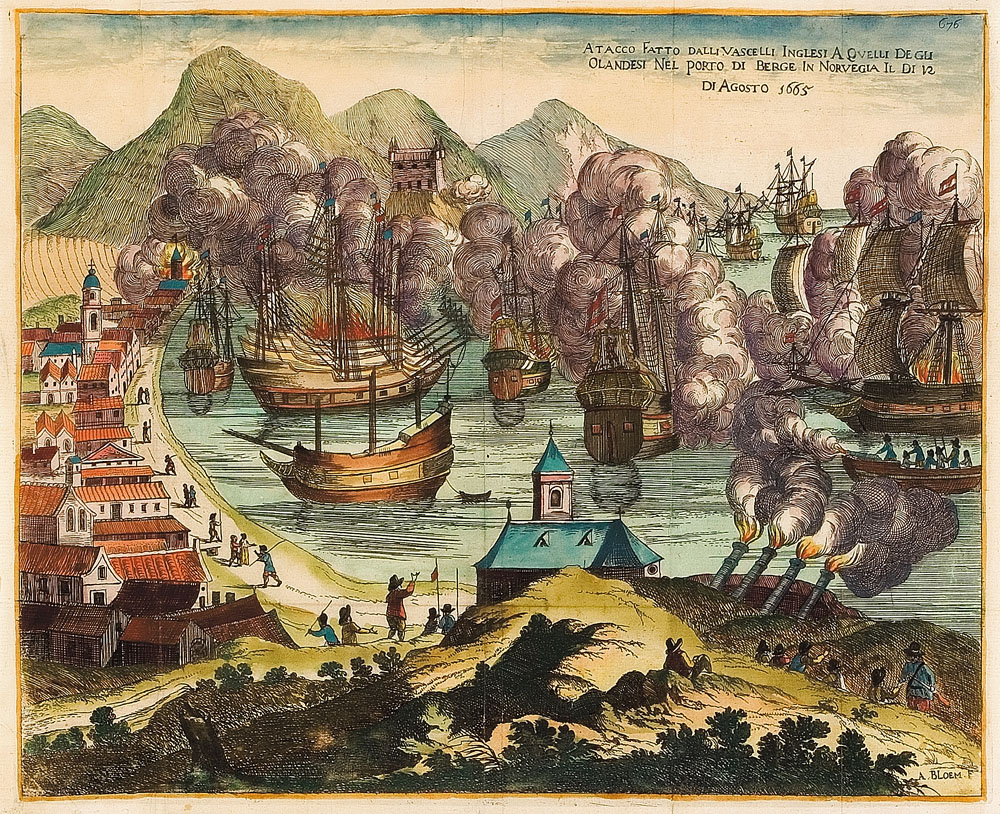
August 2: The Dutch Navy defeats England's Royal Navy off of Norway in the Battle of Vågen

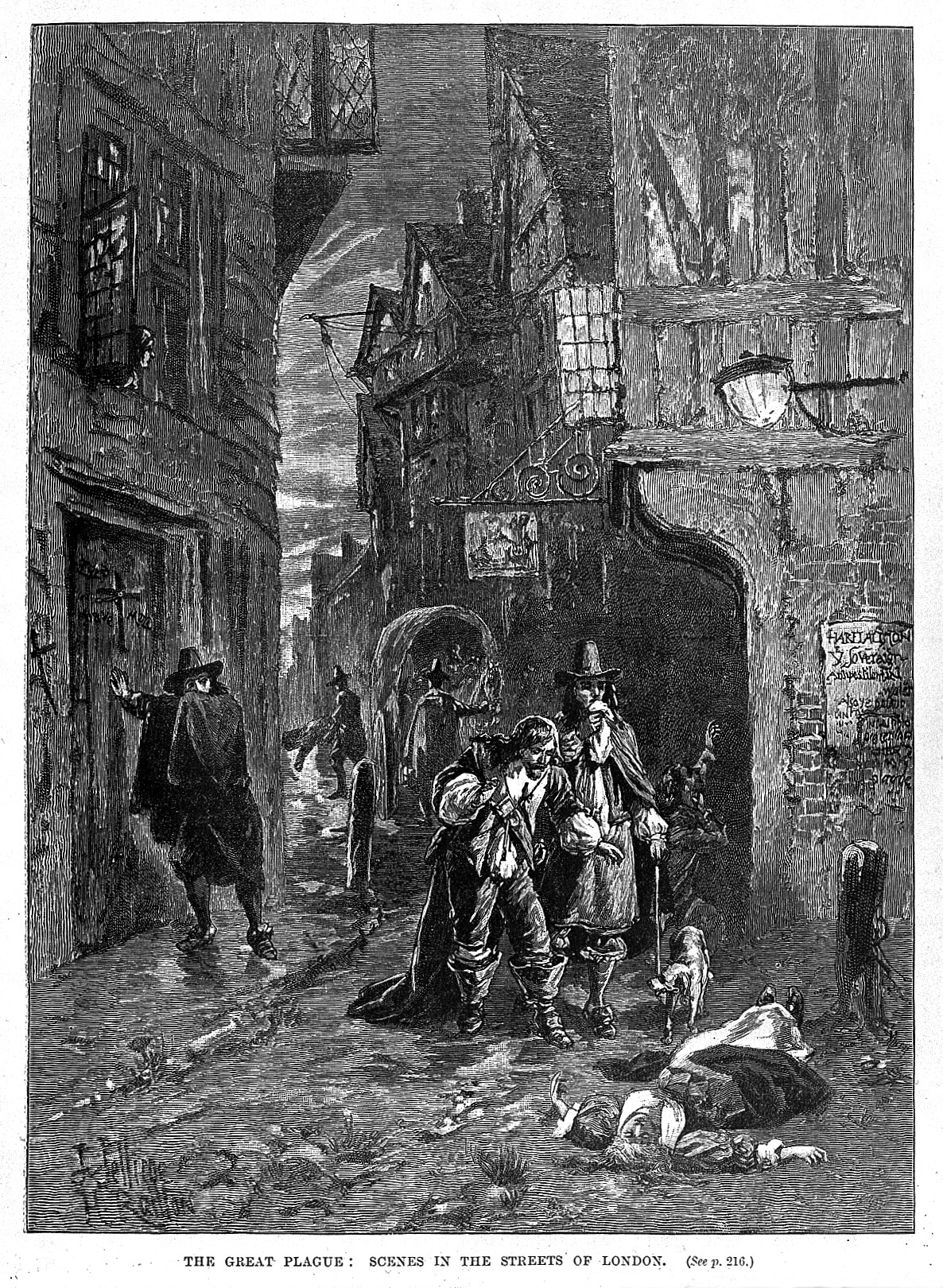
The Bubonic Plague arrives in London

1665 (MDCLXV) was a common year starting on Thursday of the Gregorian calendar and a common year starting on Sunday of the Julian calendar, the 1665th year of the Common Era (CE) and Anno Domini (AD) designations, the 665th year of the 2nd millennium, the 65th year of the 17th century, and the 6th year of the 1660s decade. As of the start of 1665, the Gregorian calendar was 10 days ahead of the Julian calendar, which remained in localized use until 1923.

== Events ==
=== January–March ===
- January 5 – The Journal des sçavans begins publication as the first scientific journal in France.
- February 15 – Molière's comedy Dom Juan ou le Festin de pierre, based on the Spanish legend of the womanizer Don Juan Tenorio and Tirso de Molina's Spanish play El burlador de Sevilla y convidado de piedra, premieres in Paris at the Théâtre du Palais-Royal.
- February 21 – In India, Shivaji Bhonsale of the Maratha Empire captures the English East India Company's trading post at Sadashivgad (in the modern-day Indian state of Karnataka).
- February – In England, Dr. Richard Lower performs the first blood transfusion between animals. According to his account to the Royal Society journal Philosophical Transactions in December, Dr. Lower "towards the end of February... selected one dog of medium size, opened its jugular vein, and drew off blood, until its strength was nearly gone. Then, to make up for the great loss of this dog by the blood of a second, I introduced blood from the cervical artery of a fairly large mastiff, which had been fastened alongside the first, until this latter animal showed it was overfilled by the inflowing blood."
- March 4 – The Second Anglo-Dutch War begins.
- March 6 – The Philosophical Transactions of the Royal Society of London begins publication in England, the first scientific journal in English and the oldest to be continuously published.
- March 11 – A new legal code is approved for the Dutch and English towns of New York, guaranteeing all Protestants the right to continue their religious observances unhindered.
- March 16 – Bucharest allows Jews to settle in the city, in exchange for an annual tax of 16 guilders.

=== April–June ===
- April 12 – The burial of Margaret Porteous is recorded; hers is the first known death during the Great Plague of London. This last major outbreak of Bubonic plague in the British Isles has possibly been introduced from the Netherlands. Two-thirds of Londoners leave the city, but over 68,000 die. The plague spreads to Derbyshire.
- May 19 – Great fire of Newport, Shropshire, England.
- June 11 – Shivaji, leader of the Bhonsale clan of the Marathas in India, signs the Treaty of Purandar with the Mughal Empire, giving up 23 of the 35 forts under his control, agreeing to pay reparations to the Mughal Emperor Aurangzeb, and sending his son to stay as a hostage at Agra.
- June 12 – England installs a municipal government in New York City (the former Dutch settlement of New Amsterdam).
- June 13 (June 3 O.S.) – Second Anglo-Dutch War – Battle of Lowestoft: The English Navy, under James Stuart, Duke of York, is victorious against the Dutch.
- June 17 – Battle of Montes Claros between Spanish and a combined Anglo-Portuguese force ends with a decisive Portuguese victory.
- June 30 – King Charles II of England issues a second charter for the Province of Carolina, which clarifies and expands the borders of the Lords Proprietors' tracts.

=== July–September ===
- July 7 – King Charles II of England leaves London with his entourage, fleeing the Great Plague. He moves his court to Salisbury, then Oxford.
- July 9 – The colonization of the south Indian Ocean island Réunion begins, with Louis XIV's East India Company (Compagnie des Indes Orientales) sending 20 permanent settlers, under the command of Etienne Regnault, from the French ship Taureau.
- July 11 – Pierre de Beausse, an envoy of France's King Louis XIV, formally claims possession of the African island of Madagascar on behalf of the French East India Company after landing on the coast in the 32-gun frigate Saint-Paul.
- August 2 – The Dutch fleet defeats the English in the Battle of Vågen off Norway in the Second Anglo-Dutch War.
- August 8 – The Great Plague forces the closure of the University of Cambridge, where Isaac Newton is a student. Newton retires to his home in Lincolnshire for safety, and stays there for two years. During this time alone, Newton will make groundbreaking discoveries in mathematics, calculus, mechanics and optics, and lay the foundations for his books Philosophiæ Naturalis Principia Mathematica and Optiks.
- August 27 – Ye Bare & Ye Cubbe, the first play in English in the American colonies, is given its first performance. The presentation takes place at Cowles Tavern in Pungoteague, Virginia. The event is documented in 1958 in a historical marker with the heading "The Bear and the Cub" which says "This first play recorded in the United States was presented August 27, 1665. The Accomack County Court at Pungoteague heard charges against three men 'for acting a play,' ordered inspection of costumes and script, but found the men 'not guilty.'"
- September 17 – Charles II of Spain becomes king while not yet four years old.
- September 22 – Molière's L'Amour médecin is first presented, before Louis XIV, at the Palace of Versailles, with music by Jean-Baptiste Lully.
- September – Robert Hooke's Micrographia is published in London, first applying the term 'cell' to plant tissue, which he discovered first in cork, then in living organisms, using a microscope.

=== October–December ===
- October 5 – Kiel University is founded in the Duchy of Holstein.
- October 21 – Louis XIV and Jean-Baptiste Colbert found the Manufacture royale des glaces of Saint Gobain, which is the oldest French company of the CAC 40, with 350 years in 2015.
- October 29 – Battle of Mbwila: Portuguese forces defeat and kill King António I of Kongo.
- November 7 – The London Gazette is first published as The Oxford Gazette.
- December 10 – The Royal Netherlands Marine Corps is founded by Michiel de Ruyter.

=== Date unknown ===
- Joan Blaeu completes publication of his Atlas Maior (Theatrum Orbis Terrarum) in Amsterdam.

== Births ==
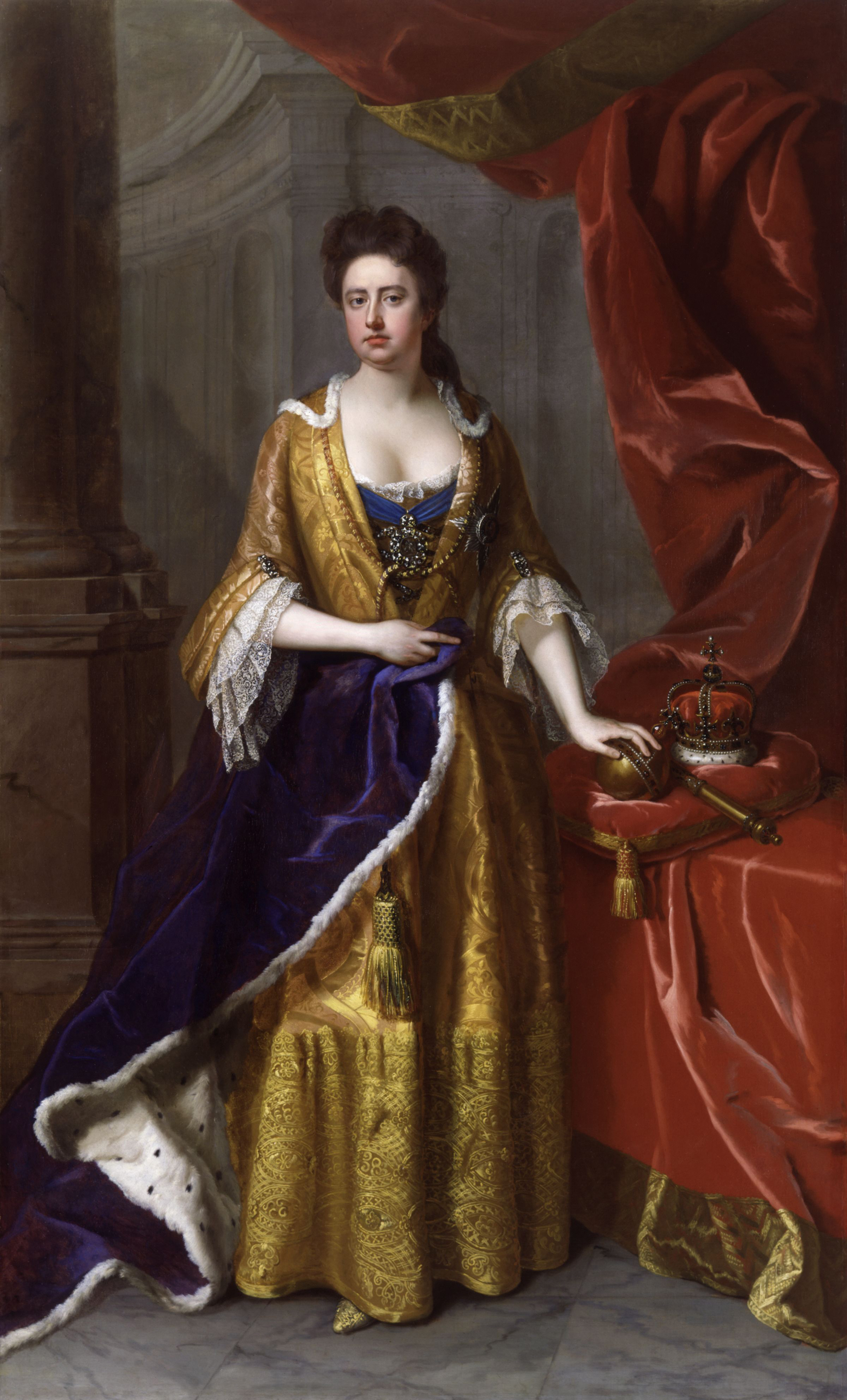
Anne, Queen of Great Britain

- February 6 – Anne, Queen of Great Britain (d. 1714)
- February 12 – Rudolf Jakob Camerarius, German botanist and physician (d. 1721)
- March 4 – Philip Christoph von Königsmarck, Swedish soldier (d. 1694)
- March 17 – Élisabeth Jacquet de La Guerre, French harpsichordist and composer (d. 1729)
- April 19 – Jacques Lelong, French bibliographer (d. 1721)
- April 29 – James Butler, 2nd Duke of Ormonde, Irish statesman and soldier (d. 1745)
- June 4 – Zacharie Robutel de La Noue, Canadian soldier (d. 1733)
- July 2 – Samuel Penhallow, English-born American colonist, historian (d. 1726)
- August 21 – Giacomo F. Maraldi, French-Italian astronomer (d. 1729)
- August 27 – John Hervey, 1st Earl of Bristol, English politician (d. 1751)
- December 25 – Lady Grizel Baillie, Scottish songwriter (d. 1746)
- December 28 – George FitzRoy, 1st Duke of Northumberland, English general (d. 1716)
- date unknown – Ingeborg i Mjärhult, Swedish soothsayer (d. 1749)

== Deaths ==
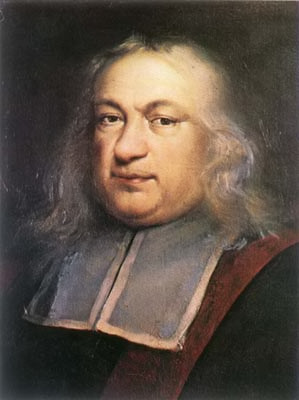
Pierre de Fermat

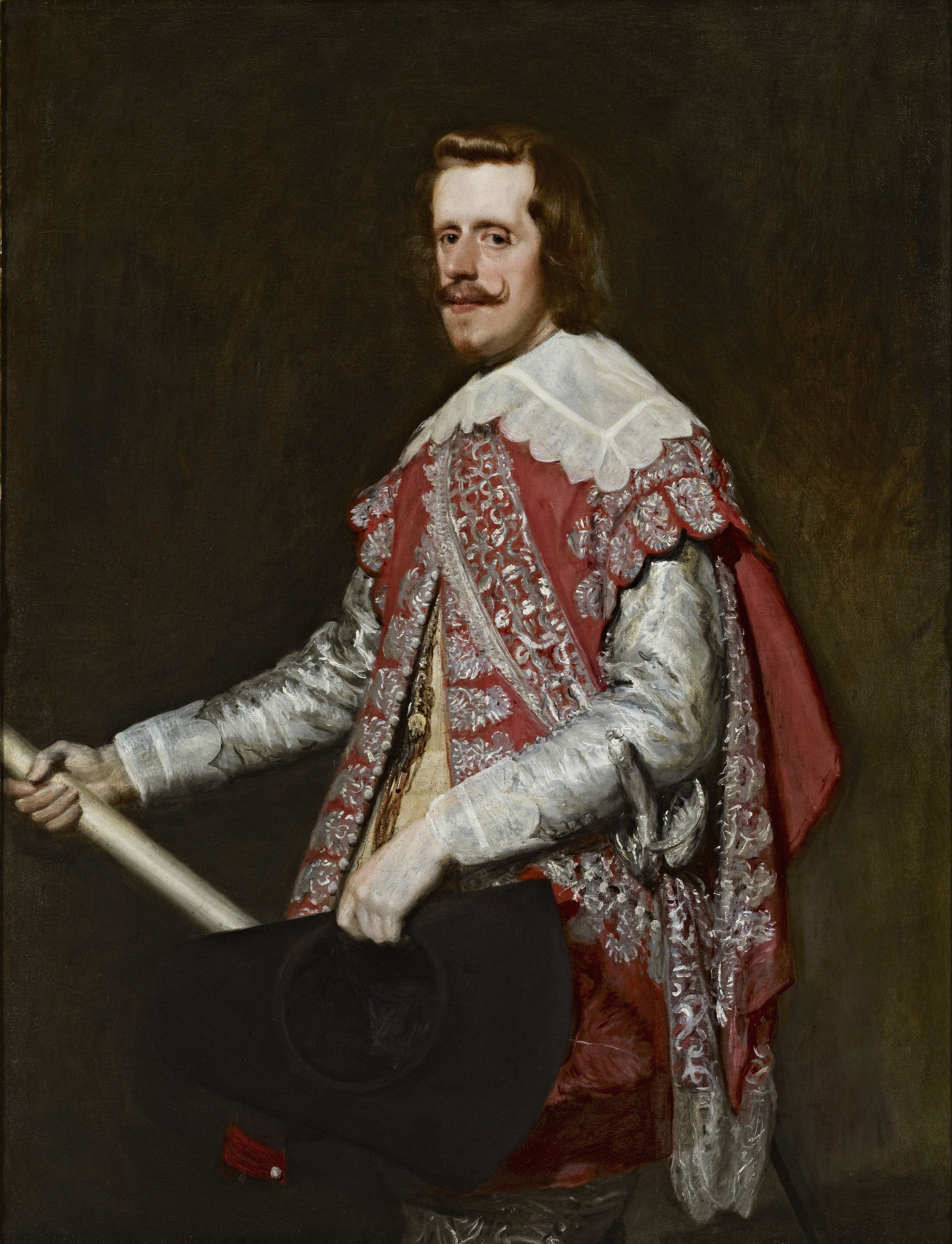
King Philip of Spain

- January 1 – Christian William of Brandenburg, administrator of the bishoprics of Magdeburg and Halberstadt (b. 1587)
- January 4 – Herman Fortunatus, Margrave of Baden-Rodemachern (b. 1595)
- January 11 – Louise de La Fayette, French courtier, friend of King Louis XIII (b. 1618)
- January 12 – Pierre de Fermat, French mathematician (b. 1607)
- January 29 – Jeanne des Anges, French Ursuline nun in Loudun (b. 1602)
- January 31 – Johannes Clauberg, German theologian and philosopher (b. 1622)
- March 1 – Thomas Wentworth, 5th Baron Wentworth, English baron and politician (b. 1612)
- March 11 – Clemente Tabone, Maltese landowner and militia member (b. c. 1575)
- March 15 – Christian Louis, Duke of Brunswick-Lüneburg (b. 1622)
- April 21 – Jean-Joseph Surin, French Jesuit writer (b. 1600)
- May 24 – Mary of Jesus of Ágreda, Franciscan abbess and spiritual writer (b. 1602)
- May 31 – Pieter Jansz. Saenredam, Dutch painter (b. 1597)
- June 3
  - Charles Berkeley, 1st Earl of Falmouth, son of Charles Berkeley (b. 1630)
  - James Ley, 3rd Earl of Marlborough, English nobleman, sailor, and mathematician (b. 1618)
- June 6 – George Christian, Prince of East Frisia, prince of Ostfriesland (b. 1634)
- June 13 – Egbert Bartholomeusz Kortenaer, Dutch admiral (b. 1604)
- June 17 – Maria Elisabeth of Holstein-Gottorp, Landgravine of Hesse-Darmstadt (b. 1634)
- June 25 – Sigismund Francis, Archduke of Austria, regent of Tyrol and Further Austria (b. 1630)
- July 11 – Kenelm Digby, English privateer (b. 1603)
- July 18 – Stefan Czarniecki, Polish general (b. 1599)
- August 14 – Charles II, Duke of Mantua and Montferrat, son of Charles of Gonzaga-Nevers of Rethel (b. 1629)
- August 28 – Elisabetta Sirani, Italian painter (b. 1638)
- September 1 – Walter Erle, English politician (b. 1586)
- September 2 – Juan Alonso de Cuevas y Davalos, Roman Catholic prelate, Archbishop of Mexico and Antequera (b. 1590)
- September 12 – Jean Bolland, Flemish Jesuit writer (b. 1596)
- September 17 – King Philip IV of Spain (b. 1605)
- September 25 – Maria Anna of Austria, Electress of Bavaria (b. 1610)
- October 22 – César, Duke of Vendôme, French nobleman (b. 1594)
- November 1 – Sir John Perceval, 1st Baronet, Irish nobleman (b. 1629)
- November 10 – Samuel Capricornus, Czech composer (b. 1628)
- November 17 – John Earle (bishop), English bishop (b. 1601)
- November 19 – Nicolas Poussin, French painter (b. 1594)
- November 20 – Julius Henry, Duke of Saxe-Lauenburg (b. 1586)
- November 24 – Simon Le Moyne, French missionary (b. 1604)
- December 2
  - Catherine de Vivonne, marquise de Rambouillet, French socialite (b. 1588)
  - Maria Angela Astorch, Spanish Roman Catholic religious figure, mystic and blessed (b. 1592)
- December 10 – Tarquinio Merula, Italian composer (b. c. 1594)
- December 29 – George Wilde, Irish bishop (b. 1610)
