= Simon Foucher =

French philosopher (1644–1696)

Simon Foucher (1 March 1644 – 27 April 1696) was a French polemic philosopher. His philosophical standpoint was one of Academic skepticism: he did not agree with dogmatism, but didn't resort to Pyrrhonism, either.

== Life ==
He was born in Dijon, the son of a merchant, and appears to have taken holy orders at a very early age. For some years he held the position of honorary canon at Dijon, but he resigned in order to take up his residence in Paris. He graduated at the Sorbonne, having studied theology, and spent the remainder of his life in literary work in Paris, where he died.

== Works ==
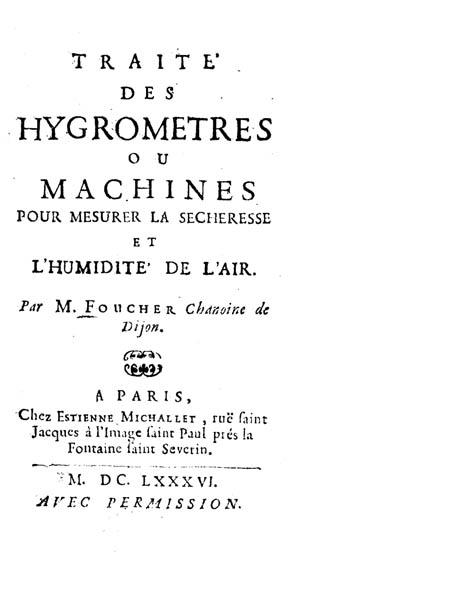
Traité des hygrometres (1686)

In his day Foucher enjoyed considerable reputation as a keen opponent of Malebranche and Leibniz. He revived the old arguments of the Academy, and advanced them with much ingenuity against Malebranche's doctrine. Otherwise his skepticism is subordinate to orthodox belief, the fundamental dogmas of the church seeming to him intuitively evident. His object was to reconcile his religious with his philosophical creed, and to remain a Christian without ceasing to be an academician.

In his 1673 publication, Dissertation on the Search for Truth, he brought to light people's psychological predilection for certainties. He wrote about the art of doubting—about positioning oneself between doubting and believing. He wrote, "One needs to exit doubt in order to produce science—but few people heed the importance of not exiting from it prematurely....It is a fact that one usually exits doubt without realizing it." He wrote further, "We are dogma-prone from our mother's wombs."

== Principal works ==
Foucher had the annoying habit of re-using the same titles for his works, making it necessary to cite the whole subtitle in order to specify which work is being referred to.

- 1673: Dissertations sur la recherche de la vérité, ou sur la logique des academiciens (Dissertations on the search for truth, or on the logic of the Academics) (Foucher did not publish this work but distributed it privately. It is now lost and known only from Foucher's own references to it in later writings.)
- 1675:Critique de la Recherche de la vérité, où l'on examine en méme temps une partie des principes de Mr Descartes (Critique of the "Search for truth", in which some of the principles of Mr Descartes are examined at the same time) (A critique of Malebranche's work of that title; Foucher believed that because Malebranche chose the same title as Foucher, he was deliberately replying to Foucher's work. Note that only the first volume of Malebranche's book had appeared at this stage, which Foucher took to be the complete work.)
- 1679: Nouvelle dissertation sur la recherche de la vérité, contenant la réponse à la Critique de la Critique de la Recherche de la Verité (New dissertation on the search for the truth, containing the response to the Critique of the Critique of the Search for truth) (Robert Desgabets had replied to Foucher's attack on Malebranche; this was Foucher's reply. Written in 1676, but published in 1679, as publishers were reluctant to take it on.)
- 1687: Dissertation sur la recherche de la vérité, contenant l'apologie des academiciens, où l'on fait voir que leur maniere de philosopher est la plus utile pour la religion, et la plus conforme au bon sense, pour servir de réponse à la Critique de la Critique, etc.; avec plusiers remarques sur les erreurs des sens et sur l'origine de la philosophie de Monsieur Descartes (Dissertation on the search for truth, containing the defence of the Academics, in which is shown that their manner of philosophising is the most useful for religion and the closest to good sense, to serve as a response to the Critique of the Critique, etc.; with several remarks on the errors of the senses and on the origins of Mr Descartes' philosophy)
- 1688: Lettre sur la morale de Confucius, philosophe de la Chine (Letter on the morals of Confucius, Chinese philosopher) (Foucher argues that, despite not being Christian, Chinese morality is admirable.)
- 1693: Dissertations sur la recherche de la vérité, contenant l'histoire et les principes de la philosophie des académiciens. Avec plusieurs réflexions sur les sentimens de M. Descartes (Dissertations on the search for truth, containing the history and principles of the philosophy of the Academics; with several reflections on the views of Mr Descartes) (Intended as a summary of Foucher's views in his previous writings, with some new material.)
- Traité des hygrometres ou machines pour mesurer la secheresse et l'humidité de l'air. Par m. Foucher chanoine de Dijon. A Paris: chez Estienne Michallet, ruà« saint Jacques à l'image saint Paul prés la fontaine saint Severin. 1686.

In addition to these works, Foucher published two long poems, and a few shorter philosophical pieces. He also conducted an important correspondence with Leibniz and wrote, but never published, a play.
