= Collège de la Marche =

Collège de la Marche, also known as collège de la Marche-Winville, is a subdivision of the old University of Paris located at de la Montagne Sainte-Geneviève street (rue de la Montagne-Sainte-Geneviève) in Paris, France.

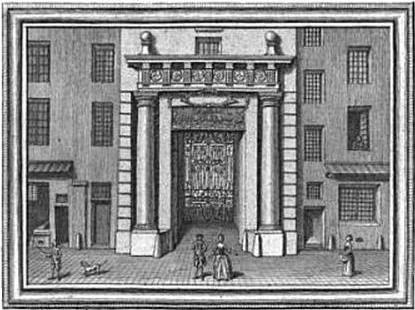
Facade of the Collège de la Marche

Corderius served as a professor and John Calvin was a student here. In 1523, Cordier was admitted to the College of la Marche as the Chair of Rhetoric. He taught John Calvin, and Calvin dedicated his Commentaries on the Epistle to the Thessalonians to him.
