= Louis Gayant =

French surgeon and anatomist

Louis Gayant (died 1673) was a French surgeon and anatomist. He was one of the founding members of the French Academy of Sciences.

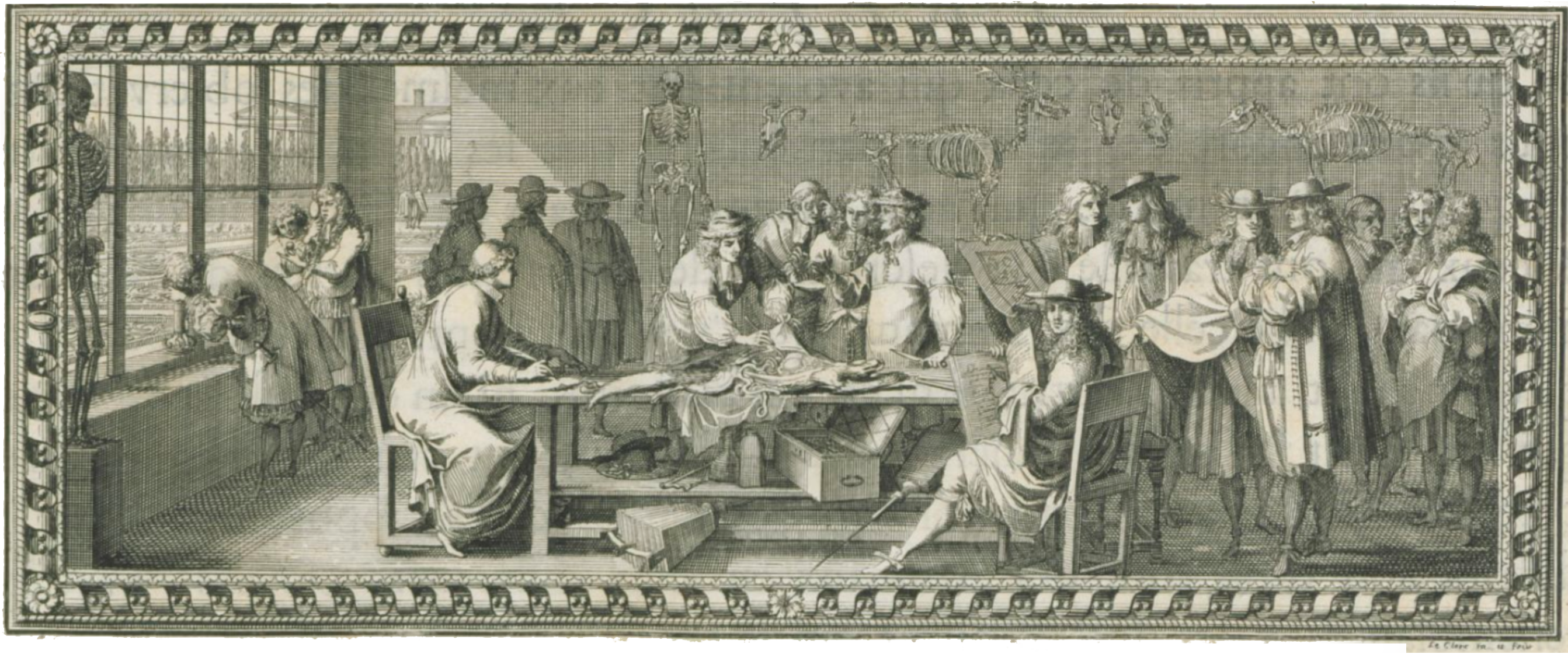
Louis Gayant (centre) performing a dissection for the French Academy of Sciences

He was born at Clermont-en-Beauvaisis, and became a leading anatomist, but remained unpublished. He is given credit in the discovery by Jean Pecquet of the Cisterna chyli.

Gayant was associated with the Collège de Saint-Côme. He died at the Siege of Maastricht, while on active service as a military surgeon.
