= Robert Greene (philosopher) =

English philosopher

Robert Greene (1678?–1730), was an English philosopher.

== Early life ==
Greene, the son of Robert Greene, a mercer of Tamworth, Staffordshire, by his wife Mary Pretty of Fazeley, was born about 1678. His father, who according to the son was a repository of all the Christian virtues, died while Greene was a boy, and it was through the generosity of his uncle, John Pretty, rector of Farley, Hampshire, that he was sent to Clare Hall, Cambridge. He graduated B.A. 1699, and M.A. 1703. He became a fellow and tutor of his college and took orders.

== Career and works ==
In 1711 he published 'A Demonstration of the Truth and Divinity of the Christian Religion,' and in the following year 'The Principles of Natural Philosophy, in which is shown the insufficiency of the present systems to give us any just account of that science.' The latter work was ridiculed and parodied in 'A Taste of Philosophical Fanaticism ... by a gentleman of the University of Gratz.' Greene, while taking an active part in college and parochial work, was convinced that the whole field of knowledge was his proper province, and devoted many years' leisure to the production of his next work, a large folio volume of 980 pages, entitled 'The Principles of the Philosophy of the Expansive and Contractive Forces, or an Enquiry into the Principles of the Modern Philosophy, that is, into the several chief Rational Sciences which are extant,' 1727. In the preface Greene, after being at some pains to prove himself a whig, declared his intention of proposing a philosophy, English, Cantabrigian, and Clarensian, which he ventured to call the 'Greenian,' because his name was 'not much worse in the letters which belonged to it than those of Galileo and Descartes.' The book is a monument of ill-digested and misapplied learning.

In 1727 Greene served as proctor at Cambridge University, and in the next year he proceeded D.D. He died at Birmingham 16 Aug. 1730, and was buried at All Saints, Cambridge, where he had for three years officiated. In his will he named eight executors, five being heads of Cambridge colleges, and directed that his body should be dissected and the skeleton hung up in the library of King's College; monuments to his memory were to be placed in the chapels of Clare and King's colleges, in St. Mary's Church, and at Tamworth, for each of which he supplied a long description of himself; finally, Clare Hall was to publish his posthumous works, and on condition of observing this and his other directions was to receive his estate, failing which it was to go to St. John's, Trinity, and Jesus colleges, and on refusal of each to Sidney Sussex. None of his wishes were complied with, and it was stated by a relative of Greene (Gent. Mag. 1783, ii. 657) that his effects remained with Sidney Sussex, but that college preserves no record of having received the benefactions.
