= John Norris (philosopher) =

English theologian, philosopher and poet

John Norris, sometimes called John Norris of Bemerton (1657–1712), was an English theologian, philosopher and poet associated with the Cambridge Platonists.

== Life ==
John Norris was born at Collingbourne Kingston, Wiltshire. He was educated at Winchester School, and Exeter College, Oxford, gaining a B.A. in 1680. He was later appointed a fellow of All Souls College, Oxford (M.A. 1684). He lived a quiet life as a country parson and thinker at Fugglestone St Peter with Bemerton, Wiltshire, from 1692 until his death early in 1712.

== Works ==
In philosophy he was a Platonist and mystic. He became an early opponent of John Locke, whose An Essay Concerning Human Understanding (1690) he attacked in Christian Blessedness or Discourses upon the Beatitudes in the same year; he also combatted Locke's theories in his Essay toward the Theory of the Ideal or Intelligible World (1701–4). He attacked religious schism in Christian Blessedness and The Charge of Schism, Continued.

Others among his 23 works are An Idea of Happiness (1683), Miscellanies (1687), Theory and Regulation of Love (1688), and a Discourse concerning the Immortality of the Soul (1708). His most popular work is A Collection of Miscellanies, consisting of Poems, Essays, Discourses and Letters (1687). Norris was influenced by Malebranche in his approach to Platonic philosophy.

His frequently-cited poem The Resignation was often published during the first half of the eighteenth century. Samuel Richardson quoted it to Andrew Millar (a prominent London bookseller) on the death of Millar's son, possibly from the then most recent edition, A Collection of Miscellanies (London: E. Parker, 1740).

== Sources ==
- MacKinnon, Flora Isabel, "The Philosophy of John Norris of Bemerton", Psychological Review Publications, Vol. 1, No. 2, October 1910, The Review Publishing Co., Baltimore, Agents: G.E. Stechert & Co., London, Paris (1910)
- Acworth, Richard (1979). The philosophy of John Norris of Bemerton: (1657-1712) (Studien und Materialien zur Geschichte der Philosophie : Kleine Reihe; Bd. 6)
- Selections from the Worlds Devotional Classics.
