= Francesco D'Andrea =

Italian jurist and natural philosopher

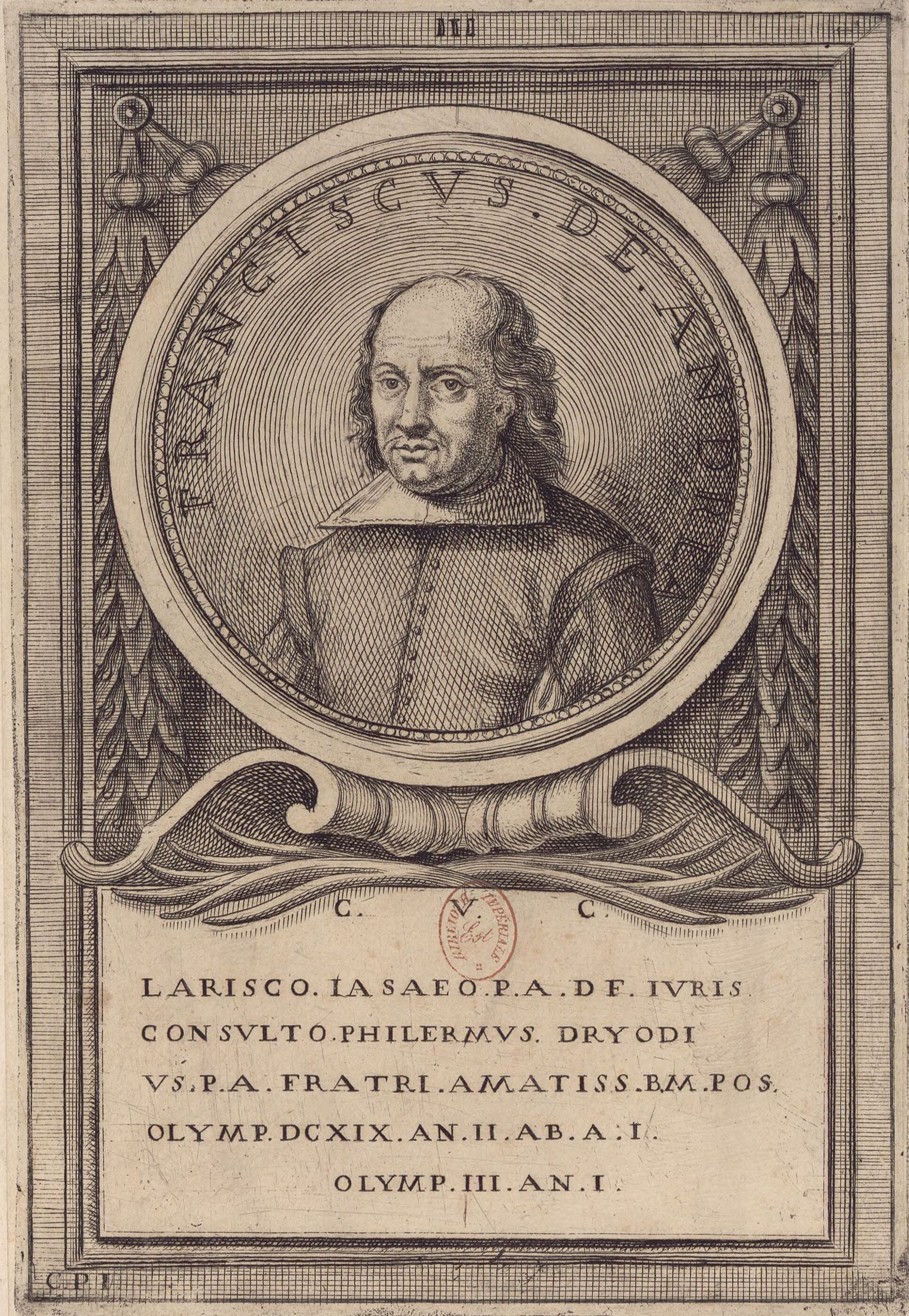
Francesco D'Andrea

Francesco D'Andrea (1625–1698) was an Italian jurist and natural philosopher.

Born to a patrician family in Naples, he worked as an advocate after obtaining his doctorate in law in 1641. He was active in philosophical circles, including in the Accademia degli Investiganti, which sought to promote modern natural philosophy and the thought of Descartes. In 1688, he was named a judge on the Vicaria tribunal, and later served as a legal advisor to the Neapolitan crown.

D'Andrea's legal writings focused on issues of constitutional law in the context of the Kingdom of Naples. He is best remembered for the Avvertimenti ai nipoti (1696), a collection of philosophical and practical advice for lawyers, and for the Apologia in difesa degli atomisti (1685), an influential apology of atomism.
