= Mulla Mahmud Jaunpuri =

Indian natural philosopher and astronomer (1606–1651)

Mulla Mahmud Jaunpuri (Persian: ملّا محمود جونپوری; 1606–1651) was an important Indian natural philosopher and astronomer of the 17th century under the reign of Shah Jahan. He was from a family of Hindu astrologers who converted to Islam under the patronage of a Sufi saint during Akbar rule. Book II of his classic Shams-e-Bazeghi is on theoretical astronomy, where he raises doubts about the Ptolemaic system. He discusses various views on the spots of the Moon, refutes them, and advances his own theory that these are some tiny bodies on which the Sun's light does not reflect.

He has a number of works on natural philosophy and logic to his credit. It is related that he requested Emperor Shah Jahan to sanction a place suitable for setting up of an observatory but as the emperor was busy in wars and other state problems he could not get enough time to examine the feasibility of the project.

His work Shams-e-Bazeghi is supposed to be the most important work of an Indian in natural philosophy written in Urdu. The original title was Hikmat-e-Balegha but the author himself elucidated the contents and named the revised version Shams-e-Bazeghi. In this treatise, he refuted the doctrine of atemporal origination (huduth-e-dahri) proposed by the Iranian philosopher Mir Damad.
