= Blanquefort-sur-Briolance =

- Commune
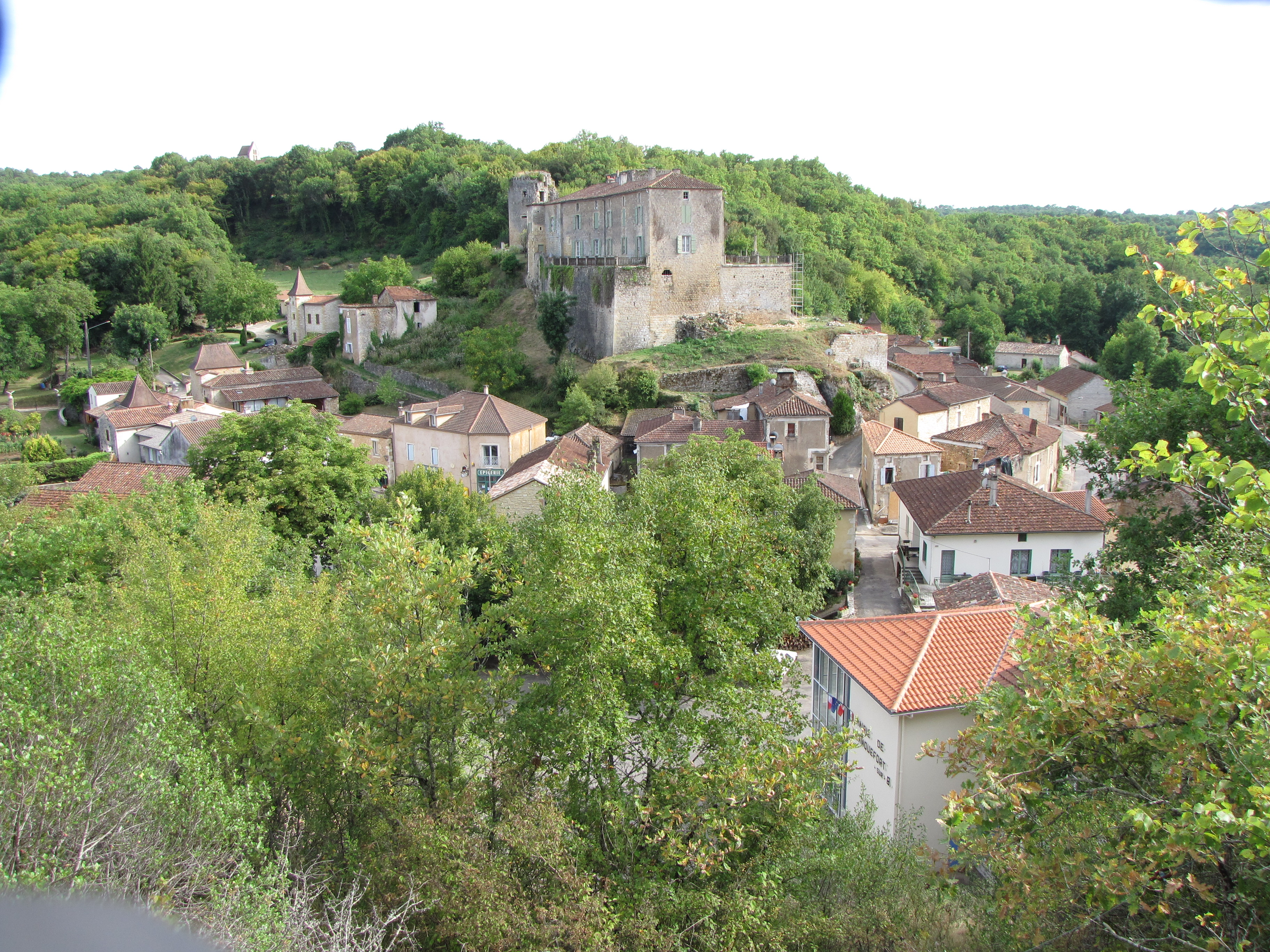
- A general view of Blanquefort-sur-Briolance
- Location of Blanquefort-sur-Briolance
- Location within France Location within Nouvelle-Aquitaine
- Coordinates: 44°36′N 0°58′E
- Country: France
- Region: Nouvelle-Aquitaine
- Department: Lot-et-Garonne
- Arrondissement: Villeneuve-sur-Lot
- Canton: Le Fumélois

Government
  - Mayor (2020–2026): Sophie Gargowitsch
- Area^{1}: 41.93 km^{2} (16.19 sq mi)
- Elevation: 200 m (660 ft)
- Highest elevation: 274 m (899 ft)
- Lowest elevation: 104 m (341 ft)
- Population (2023): 518
  - Density: 12.4/km^{2} (32.0/sq mi)
- Time zone: UTC+01:00 (CET)
  - Summer (DST): UTC+02:00 (CEST)
- INSEE/Postal code: 47029 /47500
- ^{1} French Land Register data, which excludes lakes, ponds, glaciers > 1 km^{2} (0.386 sq mi or 247 acres) and river estuaries.

Blanquefort-sur-Briolance (French pronunciation: [blɑ̃kfɔʁ syʁ bʁijɔlɑ̃s]; Occitan: Blancafòrt de Briolança) is a commune in the Lot-et-Garonne department in southwestern France.

== Population ==
Historical population
Year	Pop.	±% p.a.
1968	666	—
1975	587	−1.79%
1982	549	−0.95%
1990	468	−1.98%
1999	492	+0.56%
2007	505	+0.33%
2012	509	+0.16%
2017	470	−1.58%
2023	518	+1.63%
Source: INSEE

== See also ==
- Communes of the Lot-et-Garonne department
