= Jean-Denis de Montlovier =

French Encyclopédistes, playwright and lawyer (1733–1804)

Jean-Denis de Montlovier (1733, Valence (Dauphiné) – 1804, Dagues near Marsanne) was an 18th-century French man of letters.

After studying law, Montlovier was a lawyer by the Parlement du Dauphiné (Parlement de Grenoble) before serving in the company of the gendarmes of the royal guard.

When he retired, he dedicated himself to letters. He contributed one page to the article "voleur" (thief) of the Encyclopédie by Diderot and D’Alembert where he attacks the application of the death penalty for desertion and suggests solutions.

He also composed the five-act comedy in verse entitled L’Ami de Cour, by a former soldier (Valence, Marc-Aurel, an IX).

== Sources ==
- Justin Brun-Durand, Dictionnaire biographique et biblio-iconographique de la Drôme, 2 vol., 1900-1901, vol. 2, p. 165-66
- Jean-Denis de Montlovier on Persée
