= Johannes Clauberg =

German theologian and philosopher (1622–1665)

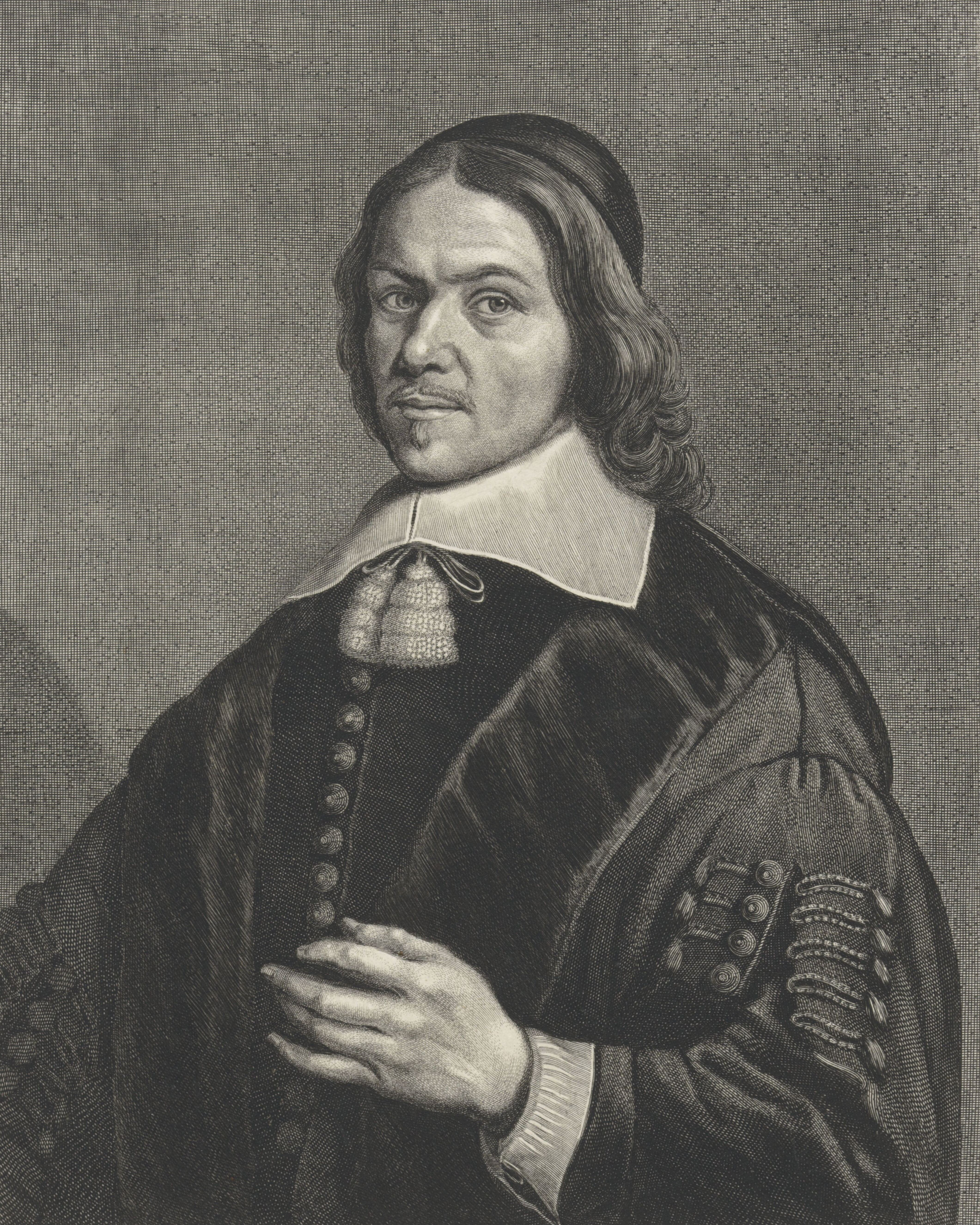
- Portrait by Jonas Suyderhoef, c. 1655–1664
- Born: 24 February 1622; Solingen, Duchy of Berg, Holy Roman Empire
- Died: 31 January 1665 (aged 42); Duisburg, Duchy of Cleves, Holy Roman Empire

Philosophical work
- Era: 17th-century philosophy
- Region: Western philosophy
- School: Cartesianism
- Institutions: University of Duisburg
- Main interests: Logic, metaphysics, theology, ontology, mind-body problem

Johannes Clauberg (24 February 1622 – 31 January 1665) was a German philosopher and theologian. Clauberg was the founding Rector of the first University of Duisburg, where he taught from 1655 to 1665. He is known as a "scholastic cartesian".

== Biography ==
He was born in Solingen, and educated in the Aristotelian tradition in Köln, Moers and Bremen, then in Groningen, where he discovered what came to be called the reformed variation of Aristotelianism. He gave his first disputations in Groningen under the supervision of Tobias Andreae. His first treatise in metaphysics was written in those student years: Elementa philosophiae sive Ontosophia (1647). Travelling in France and England, he came to study the Cartesian philosophy under Johannes de Raey at Leiden. In 1649, he became professor of philosophy and theology at Herborn, but subsequently (1651), in consequence of the jealousy of his colleagues, accepted an invitation to a similar post at Duisburg.

Clauberg was one of the earliest teachers of the new doctrines in Germany and an exact and methodical commentator on his masters writings. His theory of the connection between the soul and the body is in some respects analogous to that of Malebranche; but he is not therefore to be regarded as a true forerunner of Occasionalism, as he uses Occasion for the stimulus which directly produces a mental phenomenon, without postulating the intervention of God. His view of the relation of God to his creatures is held to foreshadow the pantheism of Spinoza. All creatures exist only through the continuous creative energy of the Divine Being, and are no more independent of his will than are our thoughts independent of us, or rather less, for there are thoughts which force themselves upon us whether we will or not.

Metaphysics, in Clauberg's conception, studies not the being (ens), but the intelligible, as in the most general object of the intellect (ens cogitabile). The most high concept is not being, but the object in general as known to the intellect. For metaphysics Clauberg suggested the names ontosophy or ontology, the latter being afterwards adopted by Wolff. In the prolegomena to his Elementa philosophiae sive Ontosophiae (1647), Clauberg says:

Since the science which is about God calls itself Theosophy or Theology, it would seem fitting to call Ontosophy or Ontology that science which does not deal with this and that being, as distinct from the others owing to its special name or properties, but with being in general.

Étienne Gilson writes:

This text may be held, in the present state of historical knowledge, for the birth certificate of ontology as a science conceived after the pattern of theology, yet radically distinct from it, since being qua being is held there as indifferent to all its conceivable determinations. 'There is, Clauberg says, a certain science which envisages being inasmuch as it is being, that is, inasmuch as it is understood to have a certain common nature or degree of being, a degree which is to be found in both corporeal and incorporeal beings, in God and in creatures, in each and every singular being according to its own mode.' Leibniz will later praise Clauberg for such an undertaking, but he will regret that it had not been a more successful one. The very word "ontology" occurs at least once in an undated fragment of Leibniz, and one can expect accidentally to meet it later in various places, but it is not until 1729 that it finally comes into its own with the Ontologia of Christian Wolff."

Clauberg died in Duisburg, and lies buried in the city's cathedral.

== Works ==
A collected edition of his philosophical works was published at Amsterdam (1691), with life by H. C. Hennin; see also E. Zeller, Geschichte der deutschen Philosophie seit Leibnitz (1873).

- Disputatio theologica practica de conscientia, Groningen, 1646.
- [prop.], Tobias Andreae [praes.], Tessarakas thesium philosophicarum de logicae ab aliis disciplinis quibuscum vulgo confundi assolet distinctione (Groningen, 1646), 4 p.
- Elementa philosophiae seu Ontosophia. Scientia prima, de iis quae Deo creaturisque suo modo communiter attribuuntur, distincta partibus quatuor, quarum I. Prolegomena, quibus ostenditur ratio huius scientiae perficiendae; II. Didactica, ipse nim. Ontosophia seu scientia prima et catholica methodo didascalicae inclusa brevissime; III. De usu illius scientiae in caeteris facultatibus ac scientiis omnibus; IV. Diacritica de differentia huius scientiae ab aliis disciplinis et imprimis theologia et logica quibuscum vulgo confundi solet. Pro mensura gratiae divinae impraesentiarum adspiranis elaborata, et ad elicienda Doctorum de his conatibus vel continuandis vel corrigendis iudiciis, iuris publici facta (Groningen, 1647).
- Defensio cartesiana adversus Iacobum Revium ... et Cyriacum Lentulum pars prior exoterica, in qua Renati Cartesii dissertatio de Methodo vindicatur, simul illustria Cartesianae logicae et philosophiae specimina exhibentur (Amsterdam, 1652).
- Logica vetus et nova, quadripartita, modum inveniendae ac tradendae veritatis in Genesi simul et analysi facile methodo exhibens (Editio princeps, Amsterdam, 1654; Editio secunda, Amsterdam, 1658; Editio tertia, Sulzbach, 1685); Specimen logicae Cartesianae seu modus philosophandi ubi ... in quibusdam novae introductionis in philosophiam aulicam veritas paucis expenditur. Studio Pauli Michaelis Rhegenii (Leipzig, 1689).
- Initiatio philosophi, sive dubitatio Cartesiana, ad metaphysicam certitudinem viam aperiens (Leiden, 1655).
- De Cognitione Dei et nostri, quatenus naturali rationis lumine, secundum veram philosophiam, potest comparari, exercitationes centum (Duisburg, 1656).
- Redenkonst, Het menschelyk verstandt in de dingen te beghrijpen, oordelen, en onthouden, stierende Johan Klauberghens. Vertaalt uit het Latyn (Amsterdam, 1657).
- Paraphrasis in R. Descartes Meditationes de prima Philosophia (Duisburg, 1658).
- Ontosophia nova, quae vulgo Metaphysica, Theologiae, Iurisprudentiae et Philologiae, praesertim Germanicae studiosis accomodata. Accessit Logica contracta, et quae ex ea demonstratur Orthographia Germanica (Duisburg, 1660); Metaphysica de ente, quae rectius Ontosophia... Editio tertia (Amsterdam, 1664); Ontosophia, quae vulgo metaphysica vocatur, notis perpetuis in philosophiae et theologiae studiosorum usum illustrata, a Joh. Henrico Suicero. In calce annexa est Claubergii logica contracta (Tiguri, 1694).
- Ars Etymologica Teutonum e Philosophiae fontibus derivata, id est, via Germanicarum vocum et origines et praestantiam detegendi; cum plurium tum harum Vernunft, Suchen, Außspruch exemplis atque exinde enatis regulis praemonstrata (Duisburg, 1663).
- Physica, quibus rerum corporearum vis et natura... explicantur (Amsterdam, 1664); Dictata physica privata, id est physica contracta seu theses physicae, commentario perpetuo explicatae (Frankfurt, 1681; Leipzig, 1689).
- [praes.], Chilias thesium ad philosophiam naturalem pertinentium... disputanda in Academia Duisburgensi (Groningen, 1668).
- Differentia inter Cartesianum et alias in Scholis usitatam Philosophiam (Groningen, 1680).
- Opera omnia philosophica, ed. Johannes Theodor Schalbruch, 2 vol. (Amsterdam, 1691); reprint Hildesheim, Georg Olms, 1968.
