= Richard Burthogge =

Richard Burthogge (1637/38–1705) (alias Borthoge, Burthog, Latinized to Burthoggius) of Devon, England, was a physician, magistrate and philosopher.

== Life ==
Richard Burthogge was the son of a Captain of Foot at the garrison of Plymouth, and was baptised in Plympton St Maurice on 30 January 1637 (OS; 1638 by Modern Style). He attended Exeter Grammar School, was admitted to All Souls College, Oxford, as a servitor in 1654, migrated to Lincoln College, Oxford, and graduated B.A. "completed by determination" in 1658. He matriculated at the University of Leiden in October 1661. His doctoral thesis was entitled "De lithiasi et calculo" and submitted on 27 February 1662.

Back in England, Burthogge practiced medicine in and near Totnes. He spent many years at Bowden House, Ashprington, near Totnes, which belonged to his sister's husband Edward Giles. Unprejudiced even against Catholics and probably himself a Non-Conformist, he was made a Justice of the Peace under King James II, a position he retained under King William III.

Burthogge married at least three times. His first wife was Sarah Trevill, the daughter of Andrew Trevill, to whom he dedicated The Divine Goodness in 1670 and his Organum Vetus et Novum in 1678. In the following years, when married to Mary Deeble, Burthogge published several other works on religious subjects and two further philosophical works, both dedicated to John Locke: An Essay upon Reason, and the Nature of Spirits (1694) and Of the Soul of the World; and of Particular Souls (1699). Mary Deeble probably died in 1695. His daughters Sarah, Mary and Ann originated from these first two marriages. Ann Burthogge, who predeceased her father, left a young son, Richard Babbage, ancestor of the computer pioneer Charles Babbage. At the time of his death Burthogge was married to Honour and seems to have lived at Bowden. He died in 1705 and was buried at St. Mary's church, Totnes, on 24 July 1705.

== Opinions ==
In his philosophical and theological writings he was a critic in some respects of John Locke, but generally his supporter, and an advocate of religious toleration. His epistemology was empiricist, and he opposed innate ideas. His metaphysics was distinctive, but not completely worked out.

== Works ==
- Divine Goodness explicated and vindicated from the Exceptions of the Atheist (1670) (entitled "Tagathon, or Divine Goodness…" in the 1671 and 1672 editions)
- Causa Dei, or an Apology for God (1675)
- Organum vetus et novum, or Discourse on Reason and Truth (1678)
- An Argument for Infants' Baptism (1683)
- Vindiciae Paedo-Baptismi (1685)
- Prudential Reasons for repealing the Penal Laws against all Recusants (1687)
- The Nature of Church-Government (1691)
- Essay upon Reason and the Nature of Spirits (1694)
- Of the Soul of the World; and of Particular Souls (1699)
- Christianity a Revealed Mystery (1702)
