= Xenotransfusion =

Transfer of blood from one animal's veins into another's

Xenotransfusion (from Greek xenos- 'strange, foreign'), a form of xenotransplantation, was initially defined as the transfer of blood from one species into the veins of another. In most cases, it is a transfer of blood between a non-human animal and a human. However, further experimentation has been done between various non-human animal species. This procedure can be performed without affecting the health of the donor, as only about 10% of their blood volume is used each time. Utilizing the unlimited blood supply from animal sources eliminates the risk of transmitting infectious diseases between humans.

In 1658, Dom Robert Desgabets, a French monk, introduced the idea of xenotransfusion at a scientific society meeting. This society later afforded the French Academy of Sciences. Some ethical issues have been identified by the Ethics Committee of the International Xenotransplantation Association (IXA). For example, the IXA sets standards and regulations for those planning to orchestrate clinical xenotransplantation trials. The IXA has identified three major ethical areas that require adequate attention: favorable risk and benefit assessment supported by pre-clinical data, lack of alternative treatment for participants, and minimizing the risk of infection by ensuring the highest biosafety regulations are followed for selected animal donors. These are just a few examples of the ethics behind xenotransplantation.

== History ==
The first recorded blood transfusion was performed between two dogs in 1665. On June 15, 1667, Jean-Baptiste Denis, a French physician, and Paul Emmerez, a surgeon, performed the first documented xenotransfusion to humans. The transfusion occurred between a lamb and a 15-year-old boy. Carotid artery blood from the lamb was introduced to a vein in the patient's inner elbow, and the procedure ultimately resulted in a successful recovery. Denis and Emmerez performed multiple xenotransfusions together. On June 24, 1667, the duo performed a transfusion on a young Swedish nobleman. When they arrived, the patient had already lost his ability to speak and was practically unconscious. Shortly after the transfusion began, the patient was able to speak again. His health was improving until his condition grew progressively worse. A second transfusion took place, but it was unsuccessful, and the patient died.

Richard Lower, an English physician, performed a similar procedure on November 23, 1667. He successfully transfused the blood of a lamb to a 22-year-old man. In both cases, the whole blood of the lamb was directly introduced into the vein of the patient. The direct introduction of blood was due to a lack of knowledge in preventative blood coagulation techniques at the time.

After several xenotransfusion procedures, some successful some not, the French Parliament prohibited the practice of these transfusions in 1670. The English Parliament, as well as the Pope, followed suit and prohibited the procedures shortly after.

== Ethical arguments involving the pig for xenotransfusion ==
Xenotransfusion uses non-human animals to aid in the shortage of blood for blood transfusion in humans. Some scientists preliminarily favor Sus scrofa domesticus (pigs) as a source of blood after having tested many different animals in order to find the best candidate for a blood donation. Pig red blood cells (pRBCs) show many characteristics similar to that of a human, including RBC diameters (pig 6 μm; human 7.2 μm), RBC counts (pig 5.7 to 6.9 million/ll; human 4.2 to 6.2 million/ll), and RBC average lifespan (human 86 days; pig 120 days). Current evidence shows that pRBCs will function normally in humans due to the relation between porcine blood groups and human ABO group system. In addition, it is possible to produce pigs with type O blood and to genetically modify pigs to make their blood more compatible with humans. Sus scrofa domesticus's blood may be used to save lives and to increase blood quantity. The organism is kept alive and no serious harm is involved, similar to how blood is removed from humans. One article examining the ethics of xenotransfusion notes that only 10% of the animal's blood volume is used each time; therefore, it may be considered ethically acceptable to raise pigs for periodical blood collection as it does not damage the health of the animal. Likewise, using pRBCs on humans would not cause severe harm to human health.

== Veterinary xenotransfusion ==
Transfusion of canine blood into domestic cats was performed historically and continues to be performed in some countries.

Xenotransfusions have been performed on birds, though the procedure is only done to stabilize a bird in shock, due to rejection by the recipient bird's antibodies.

Xenotransfusion of bovine whole blood into domestic goats has been preliminarily investigated as a potential option for anemic goats. When comparing caprine-recipient bovine-donor cross matching a study found 11/15 caprine-bovine combinations compatible on both major and minor cross matching.
