= Robert Desgabets =

French philosopher (1610–1678)

Robert Desgabets (French: [deɡabɛ]; 1610–1678) was a French Cartesian philosopher and Benedictine prior, born in Ancemont. He published two book-length philosophical works in his lifetime, Considérations sur l'état présent de la controverse touchant le T. S. Sacrement de l'autel (Considerations on the present state of the controversy concerning the Eucharist) in 1671 and Critique de la critique de la recherche de la verité (Critique of the critique of the search for truth) in 1675.

In July 1658, Desgabets introduced the concept of blood transfusion (human-to-human) or xenotransfusion (animal-to-human) at a meeting of Henri Louis Habert de Montmor's scientific society, which would later become the French Academy of Sciences. He would later publish Discours de la communication ou transfusion du sang (Discourse on the Communication or Transfusion of Blood) in 1668.

He died in Commercy.
