= List of philosophers born in the 19th century =

Philosophers born in the 19th century (and others important in the history of philosophy), listed alphabetically:

Note: This list has a minimal criterion for inclusion and the relevance to philosophy of some individuals on the list is disputed.

== A ==
- Mustafa Kemal Atatürk, (1881-1938)
- Muhammad Abduh, (1849–1905)^{[d]}
- Robert Adamson, (1852–1902)
- Jamal al-Din al-Afghani, (1839–1897)^{[d]}
- Kazimierz Ajdukiewicz, (1890–1963)^{[b]}^{[c]}^{[d]}
- Konstantin Sergeyevich Aksakov, (1817–1860)
- Samuel Alexander, (1859–1938)^{[a]}^{[b]}^{[c]}^{[d]}
- B. R. Ambedkar, (1891–1956)
- Henri-Frédéric Amiel, (1821–1881)
- John Anderson, (1893–1962)^{[b]}^{[c]}^{[d]}
- Roberto Ardigò, (1828–1920)
- Valentin Ferdinandovich Asmus, (1894–1975)^{[d]}
- Sri Aurobindo, (1872–1950)^{[b]}^{[c]}^{[d]}
- Richard Avenarius, (1843–1896)^{[a]}^{[b]}^{[c]}^{[d]}

== B ==
- Gaston Bachelard, (1884–1962)^{[a]}^{[b]}^{[c]}^{[d]}
- Alfred Baeumler, (1887–1968)
- Alexander Bain, (1818–1903)^{[a]}^{[b]}^{[c]}
- Mikhail Bakhtin, (1895–1975)^{[a]}^{[b]}^{[c]}^{[d]}
- Mikhail Bakunin, (1814–1876)^{[a]}^{[b]}^{[c]}^{[d]}
- James Mark Baldwin, (1861–1934)
- Karl Barth, (1886–1968)^{[b]}^{[c]}^{[d]}
- Jules Barthélemy-Saint-Hilaire, (1805–1895)
- Georges Bataille, (1897–1962)^{[a]}^{[d]}
- Bruno Bauer, (1809–1882)^{[b]}^{[c]}^{[d]}^{[e]}
- David Baumgardt, (1890–1963)^{[d]}
- Oskar Becker, (1889–1964)
- Vissarion Belinsky, (1811–1848)^{[d]}
- Gustave Belot, (1859–1929)
- Julien Benda, (1867–1956)
- Walter Benjamin, (1892–1940)^{[b]}^{[c]}^{[d]}
- Nikolai Berdyaev, (1874–1948)^{[a]}^{[b]}^{[c]}^{[d]}
- Henri Bergson, (1859–1941)^{[a]}^{[b]}^{[c]}^{[d]}^{[e]}
- Eduard Bernstein, (1850–1932)^{[d]}
- Nathan Birnbaum, (1864–1937)
- Brand Blanshard, (1892–1987)^{[b]}^{[c]}
- Ernst Bloch, (1885–1977)^{[a]}^{[b]}^{[c]}^{[d]}
- Maurice Blondel, (1861–1949)^{[a]}
- Benjamin Paul Blood, (1832–1919)
- Hermann Blumenau, (1819–1899)
- George Boas, (1891–1980)
- Alexander Bogdanov, (1873–1928)^{[b]}^{[c]}^{[d]}
- Niels Bohr, (1885–1962)^{[b]}^{[c]}^{[d]}
- Ludwig Boltzmann, (1844–1906)^{[a]}^{[b]}^{[c]}
- John Elof Boodin, (1869–1950)
- George Boole, (1815–1864)^{[b]}^{[c]}^{[d]}^{[e]}*
- Bernard Bosanquet, (1848–1923)^{[a]}^{[b]}^{[c]}^{[d]}^{[e]}
- Emile Boutroux, (1845–1921)^{[d]}
- Oets Kolk Bouwsma, (1898–1978)^{[a]}
- Borden Parker Bowne, (1847–1910)^{[d]}
- F. H. Bradley, (1846–1924)^{[a]}^{[b]}^{[c]}^{[d]}^{[e]}
- Franz Brentano, (1838–1917)^{[a]}^{[b]}^{[c]}^{[d]}^{[e]}
- Percy Williams Bridgman, (1882–1961)^{[b]}^{[c]}^{[d]}
- Edgar S. Brightman, (1884–1953)^{[b]}^{[c]}
- C. D. Broad, (1887–1971)^{[a]}^{[b]}^{[c]}^{[d]}
- Luitzen Egbertus Jan Brouwer, (1881–1966)^{[a]}^{[b]}^{[c]}^{[e]}
- Orestes Brownson, (1803–1876)^{[b]}^{[c]}
- Constantin Brunner, (1862–1937)
- Emil Brunner, (1889–1966)^{[d]}
- Leon Brunschvicg, (1869–1944)^{[a]}^{[b]}^{[c]}^{[d]}
- James Bryce, 1st Viscount Bryce, (1838–1922)^{[d]}
- Martin Buber, (1878–1965)^{[a]}^{[b]}^{[c]}^{[d]}^{[e]}
- Ludwig Büchner, (1824–1899)^{[d]}
- Sergei Nikolaevich Bulgakov, (1871–1944)^{[d]}
- Rudolf Bultmann, (1884–1976)^{[b]}^{[c]}^{[d]}
- Jacob Burckhardt, (1818–1897)^{[b]}^{[c]}
- Samuel Butler, (1835–1902)^{[b]}^{[c]}

== C ==
- Cai Yuanpei, (1868–1940)
- Edward Caird, (1835–1908)^{[a]}
- Mary Whiton Calkins, (1863–1930)
- Norman Robert Campbell, (1880–1949)^{[a]}^{[d]}
- Georg Cantor, (1845–1918)^{[a]}^{[b]}^{[c]}^{[d]}
- Pantaleo Carabellese, (1877–1948)^{[a]}
- Rudolf Carnap, (1891–1970)^{[a]}^{[b]}^{[c]}^{[d]}^{[e]}*
- Lewis Carroll, (1832–1898)^{[a]}^{[b]}^{[c]}^{[d]}
- Paul Carus, (1852–1919)
- Ernst Cassirer, (1874–1945)^{[a]}^{[b]}^{[c]}^{[d]}^{[e]}
- Carlo Cattaneo, (1801–1869)^{[d]}
- Emile Auguste Chartier, (1868–1951)
- Nikolai Chernyshevsky, (1828–1889)^{[d]}
- Ch'ien Mu, (1895–1990)^{[a]}
- Leon Chwistek, (1884–1944)
- August Cieszkowski, (1814–1894)^{[d]}
- William Kingdon Clifford, (1845–1879)^{[a]}^{[b]}^{[c]}
- Chapman Cohen, (1868–1954)
- Hermann Cohen, (1842–1918)^{[a]}^{[b]}^{[c]}^{[d]}^{[e]}*
- R. G. Collingwood, (1889–1943)^{[a]}^{[b]}^{[c]}^{[d]}^{[e]}
- Josephus Flavius Cook, (1838–1901)
- John Cook Wilson, (1849–1915)^{[a]}^{[c]}
- Ananda Kentish Coomaraswamy, (1877–1947)
- Hans Cornelius, (1863–1947)
- Antoine Augustin Cournot, (1801–1877)^{[a]}^{[d]}
- Louis Couturat, (1868–1914)^{[a]}^{[b]}^{[c]}
- James Edwin Creighton, (1861–1924)
- Benedetto Croce, (1866–1952)^{[a]}^{[b]}^{[c]}^{[d]}
- Tadeusz Czezowski, (1889–1981)
- Heinrich Czolbe, (1819–1873)^{[a]}

== D ==
- Nikolay Danilevsky (1822–1885)
- Charles Darwin, (1809–1882)^{[d]}
- Augustus De Morgan, (1806–1871)^{[a]}^{[b]}^{[c]}^{[d]}
- Francesco de Sanctis, (1817–1883)
- Richard Dedekind, (1831–1916)^{[a]}^{[b]}^{[c]}^{[d]}
- Galvano Della Volpe, (1895–1968)
- Paul Deussen, (1845–1919)
- John Dewey, (1859–1952)^{[a]}^{[b]}^{[c]}^{[d]}
- Albert Venn Dicey, (1835–1922)^{[d]}
- Wilhelm Dilthey, (1833–1911)^{[a]}^{[b]}^{[c]}^{[d]}
- Hugo Dingler, (1881–1954)
- Juan Donoso Cortés (1809–1853)
- Herman Dooyeweerd, (1894–1977)^{[d]}
- Fyodor Dostoevsky, (1821–1881)^{[d]}
- Hans Adolf Eduard Driesch, (1867–1941)
- Emil du Bois-Reymond, (1818–1896)^{[d]}
- Curt Ducasse, (1881–1969)^{[a]}^{[b]}^{[c]}^{[d]}
- Pierre Duhem, (1861–1916)^{[a]}^{[b]}^{[c]}^{[d]}
- Eugen Dühring, (1833–1921)^{[b]}^{[c]}^{[d]}
- Émile Durkheim, (1858–1917)^{[b]}^{[c]}^{[d]}
- Manilal Dwivedi, (1858–1898)

== E ==
- Julius Ebbinghaus, (1885–1981)
- Arthur Eddington, (1882–1944)
- Mary Baker Eddy, (1821–1910)
- Christian von Ehrenfels, (1856–1932)
- Albert Einstein, (1879–1955)^{[a]}^{[b]}^{[c]}^{[d]}
- George Eliot, (1819–1880)^{[d]}
- Ralph Waldo Emerson, (1803–1882)^{[a]}^{[b]}^{[c]}^{[d]}^{[e]}
- Friedrich Engels (1820–1895)^{[a]}^{[b]}^{[c]}^{[d]}
- Rudolf Christoph Eucken, (1846–1926)
- Julius Evola, (1898–1974)

== F ==
- Thome H. Fang, (1899–1976)^{[a]}
- Gustav Fechner, (1801–1887)^{[a]}^{[d]}
- Feng Youlan, (1895–1990)^{[a]}
- Ernest Fenollosa, (1853–1908)
- Giuseppe Ferrari, (1812–1876)
- James Frederick Ferrier, (1808–1864)^{[d]}
- Ludwig Feuerbach, (1804–1872)^{[a]}^{[b]}^{[c]}^{[d]}^{[e]}
- Kuno Fischer, (1824–1907)
- John Fiske, (1842–1901)
- Franciszek Fiszer, (1860–1937)
- Robert Flint, (1838–1910)
- Pavel Aleksandrovich Florenskii, (1882–1937)^{[d]}
- Georges Florovsky, (1893–1979)
- Jerome Frank, (1889–1957)^{[d]}
- Philipp Frank, (1884–1966)
- Semën Liudvigovich Frank (1877–1950)^{[d]}
- Gottlob Frege, (1848–1925)^{[a]}^{[b]}^{[c]}^{[d]}^{[e]}
- Sigmund Freud, (1856–1939)^{[a]}^{[b]}^{[c]}^{[d]}
- Hans Freyer, (1887–1969)
- Nikolai Fyodorovich Fyodorov, (1829–1903)^{[d]}

== G ==
- Mahatma Gandhi, (1869–1948)^{[a]}^{[b]}^{[c]}^{[d]}
- Réginald Garrigou-Lagrange, (1887–1964)^{[d]}
- Nārāyana Guru, (1856–1928)
- Giovanni Gentile, (1875–1944)^{[a]}^{[b]}^{[c]}^{[d]}
- Otto von Gierke, (1841–1921)
- Charlotte Perkins Gilman, (1860–1935)
- Étienne Gilson, (1884–1978)^{[a]}^{[b]}^{[c]}
- Asher Ginsberg (or Ahad Ha'am), (1856–1927)^{[d]}
- Vincenzo Gioberti, (1801–1852)^{[a]}^{[d]}
- Arthur de Gobineau, (1816–1882)
- Henry George, (1839–1897)
- Antonio Gramsci, (1891–1937)^{[a]}^{[b]}^{[c]}^{[d]}
- Thomas Hill Green, (1836–1882)^{[a]}^{[b]}^{[c]}^{[d]}^{[e]}
- Kurt Grelling, (1886–1942)
- John Grote, (1813–1866)^{[d]}
- D. V. Gundappa, (1889–1975)
- G. I. Gurdjieff, (1872–1949)
- Edmund Gurney, (1847–1888)^{[d]}

== H ==
- Paul Häberlin, (1878–1960)
- Ernst Haeckel, (1834–1919)^{[a]}^{[d]}
- Axel Hägerström, (1868–1939)^{[d]}
- Béla Hamvas, (1897–1968)
- Eduard Hanslick, (1825–1904)^{[d]}
- Friedrich Harms, (1819–1880)
- William Torrey Harris, (1835–1909)
- Eduard Von Hartmann, (1842–1906)^{[a]}^{[b]}^{[c]}^{[d]}
- Nicolai Hartmann, (1882–1950)^{[a]}^{[b]}^{[c]}^{[d]}^{[e]}*
- Charles Hartshorne, (1897–2000)^{[a]}^{[b]}^{[c]}^{[e]}
- Friedrich Hayek, (1899–1992)^{[b]}^{[c]}^{[d]}
- Rudolf Haym, (1821–1901)
- Martin Heidegger, (1889–1976)^{[a]}^{[b]}^{[c]}^{[d]}^{[e]}*
- Hermann von Helmholtz, (1821–1894)^{[a]}^{[d]}
- Heinrich Rudolf Hertz, (1857–1894)^{[d]}
- Alexander Herzen, (1812–1870)^{[a]}^{[b]}^{[c]}^{[d]}
- Moses Hess, (1812–1875)^{[d]}
- Sergei Hessen, (1887–1950)^{[d]}
- David Hilbert, (1862–1943)^{[a]}^{[b]}^{[c]}
- Dietrich von Hildebrand, (1889–1977)
- Leonard Trelawny Hobhouse, (1864–1929)^{[b]}^{[c]}
- William Ernest Hocking, (1873–1966)^{[b]}^{[c]}
- Shadworth Hodgson, (1832–1912)^{[b]}^{[c]}
- Eric Hoffer, (1898–1983)^{[b]}^{[c]}
- Harald Høffding, (1843–1931)^{[b]}^{[c]}
- Wesley Newcomb Hohfeld, (1879–1918)^{[a]}^{[d]}
- Oliver Wendell Holmes Jr., (1841–1935)^{[d]}
- Max Horkheimer, (1895–1973)^{[a]}^{[d]}
- Hsiung Shih-li, (1885–1968)^{[a]}
- Hu Shih, (1891–1962)^{[a]}
- Elbert Hubbard, (1856–1915)
- Edmund Husserl, (1859–1938)^{[a]}^{[b]}^{[c]}^{[d]}^{[e]}
- Thomas Henry Huxley, (1825–1895)^{[d]}

== I ==
- Ivan Aleksandrovich Il'in, (1883–1954)^{[a]}^{[d]}
- Roman Ingarden, (1893–1970)^{[a]}^{[b]}^{[c]}^{[d]}^{[e]}
- William Ralph Inge, (1860–1954)^{[d]}
- Muhammad Iqbal, (1877–1938)^{[b]}^{[c]}^{[d]}

== J ==
- Henry James Sr., (1811–1882)
- William James, (1842–1910)^{[a]}^{[b]}^{[c]}^{[d]}^{[e]}
- Alfred Jarry, (1873–1907)
- Karl Jaspers, (1883–1969)^{[a]}^{[b]}^{[c]}^{[d]}^{[e]}*
- William Stanley Jevons, (1835–1882)^{[a]}^{[b]}^{[c]}^{[e]}*
- Rudolf von Jhering, (1818–1892)^{[d]}
- Krishnamurti Jiddu, (1895–1986)
- C.E.M. Joad, (1891–1953)
- William Ernest Johnson, (1858–1931)^{[a]}^{[b]}^{[c]}
- Jørgen Jørgensen, (1894–1969)^{[b]}^{[c]}
- Carl Jung, (1875–1961)^{[a]}^{[b]}^{[c]}^{[d]}
- Ernst Jünger, (1895–1998)

== K ==
- Kang Youwei, (1858–1927)^{[a]}
- Mordecai Kaplan, (1881–1983)^{[d]}
- Michael Ivanovich Karinski (1840–1917)
- Karl Kautsky, (1854–1938)^{[b]}^{[c]}^{[d]}
- Konstantin Kavelin (1818–1885)
- Hans Kelsen, (1881–1973)^{[b]}^{[c]}^{[d]}
- Norman Kemp Smith, (1872–1958)^{[d]}
- John Maynard Keynes, (1883–1946)^{[a]}^{[b]}^{[c]}^{[d]}
- Hermann von Keyserling, (1880–1946)
- Aleksey Khomyakov, (1804–1860)
- Søren Kierkegaard, (1813–1855)^{[a]}^{[b]}^{[c]}^{[d]}^{[e]}
- Nishida Kitaro (1870–1945)
- Wolfgang Köhler, (1887–1967)^{[a]}
- Feliks Koneczny (1862–1949)
- Alejandro Korn, (1860–1936)^{[b]}^{[c]}
- Tadeusz Kotarbiński, (1886–1981)^{[a]}^{[b]}^{[c]}^{[d]}
- Alexandre Koyre, (1892–1964)^{[d]}
- Karl Kraus, (1874–1936)^{[b]}^{[c]}
- Jiddu Krishnamurti, (1895–1986)
- Leopold Kronecker, (1823–1891)^{[d]}
- Richard Kroner, (1884–1974)
- Peter Kropotkin, (1842–1921)^{[a]}^{[b]}^{[c]}^{[d]}
- Kuki Shūzō, (1888–1941)^{[d]}

== L ==
- Antonio Labriola, (1843–1904)^{[a]}^{[d]}
- Jules Lachelier, (1832–1918)^{[d]}
- Pierre Laffitte, (1823–1903)^{[a]}
- Friedrich Albert Lange, (1828–1875)^{[a]}^{[d]}^{[e]}
- Susanne Langer, (1895–1985)^{[b]}^{[d]}
- Ferdinand Lassalle, (1825–1864)^{[d]}
- Peter Lavrovitch Lavrov, (1823–1900)^{[d]}
- Moritz Lazarus, (1824–1903)
- Edouard Louis Emmanuel Julien Le Roy, (1870–1954)^{[d]}
- Adrian LeMors, (1893–1956)
- Vladimir Lenin, (1870–1924)^{[a]}^{[b]}^{[c]}^{[d]}
- Konstantin Nikolaevich Leont'ev, (1831–1891)^{[d]}
- Jules Lequier, (1814–1862)^{[a]}
- Stanisław Leśniewski, (1886–1939)^{[a]}^{[b]}^{[c]}^{[d]}
- Lucien Lévy-Bruhl, (1857–1939)^{[b]}^{[c]}
- George Henry Lewes, (1817–1878)
- Kurt Lewin, (1890–1947)^{[a]}
- Clarence Irving Lewis, (1883–1964)^{[a]}^{[b]}^{[c]}^{[d]}^{[e]}*
- C. S. Lewis, (1898–1963)^{[a]}^{[d]}
- John Lewis, (1889–1976)
- Liang Qichao (or Liang Ch'i-ch'ao), (1873–1929)^{[a]}
- Liang Sou-ming, (1893–1988)^{[a]}
- Karol Libelt, (1807–1875)
- Israel Lipkin, (1810–1883)^{[e]}*
- Émile Littré, (1801–1881)
- Liu Shaoqi (orLiu Shao-ch'i), (1898–1969)^{[a]}
- Karl Nickerson Llywelyn, (1893–1962)^{[d]}
- Alain LeRoy Locke, (1886–1954)
- Alfred Loisy, (1857–1940)^{[d]}
- Jakob Lorber, (1800–1864)
- Aleksei Fedorovich Losev, (1893–1988)^{[d]}
- Nicholas Onufrievich Lossky, (1870–1965)^{[d]}
- Hermann Lotze, (1817–1881)^{[a]}^{[b]}^{[c]}^{[d]}^{[e]}
- Arthur O. Lovejoy, (1873–1962)^{[b]}^{[c]}
- Georg Lukács, (1885–1971)^{[a]}^{[b]}^{[c]}^{[d]}
- Jan Łukasiewicz, (1878–1956)^{[a]}^{[b]}^{[c]}^{[d]}
- Rosa Luxemburg, (1871–1919)^{[d]}

== M ==
- Mikhail Bakhtin, (1895–1975)
- Ernst Mach, (1838–1916)^{[a]}^{[b]}^{[c]}^{[d]}^{[e]}
- John Macmurray, (1891–1976)^{[c]}
- Philipp Mainländer, (1841–1876)
- Ernst Mally, (1879–1944)^{[e]}
- Karl Mannheim, (1893–1947)^{[a]}^{[b]}^{[c]}
- Henry Longueville Mansel, (1820–1871)^{[a]}
- Mao Zedong (or Mao Tse-tung), (1893–1976)^{[a]}
- Gabriel Marcel, (1887–1973)^{[a]}^{[b]}^{[c]}^{[d]}^{[e]}
- Herbert Marcuse, (1898–1979)^{[a]}^{[b]}^{[c]}^{[d]}
- Jacques Maritain, (1882–1973)^{[a]}^{[b]}^{[c]}^{[d]}^{[e]}
- Harriet Martineau, (1802–1876)^{[d]}
- James Martineau, (1805–1900)^{[a]}^{[b]}^{[c]}
- Karl Marx, (1818–1883)^{[a]}^{[b]}^{[c]}^{[d]}^{[e]}
- Tomáš Garrigue Masaryk, (1850–1937)^{[b]}^{[c]}^{[d]}
- Fritz Mauthner, (1849–1923)^{[d]}
- James Clerk Maxwell, (1831–1879)^{[a]}12^{[d]}
- James McCosh, (1811–1894)^{[a]}
- William McDougall, (1871–1938)^{[a]}
- John Ellis McTaggart, (1866–1925)^{[a]}^{[b]}^{[c]}^{[d]}
- George Herbert Mead, (1863–1931)^{[a]}^{[b]}^{[c]}^{[d]}
- Georg Mehlis, (born 19th century)
- Friedrich Meinecke, (1862–1954)^{[d]}
- Alexius Meinong, (1853–1920)^{[a]}^{[b]}^{[c]}^{[d]}^{[e]}*
- Gregor Mendel, (1822–1884)^{[a]}
- Marcelino Menéndez y Pelayo, (1856–1912)
- Désiré-Joseph Mercier, (1851–1926)^{[a]}
- Franklin Merrell-Wolff, (1887–1985)
- Emile Meyerson, (1859–1933)^{[b]}^{[c]}^{[d]}
- Carlo Michelstaedter, (1887–1910)
- Nikolai Konstantinovich Mikhailovskii, (1842–1904)^{[d]}
- Miki Kiyoshi, (1897–1945)^{[d]}
- John Stuart Mill, (1806–1873)^{[a]}^{[b]}^{[c]}^{[d]}^{[e]}
- Ludwig von Mises, (1881–1973)
- William Mitchell, (1861–1962)
- Dimitrije Mitrinovic, (1887–1953)
- W. H. S. Monck (1839–1915)
- Maria Montessori (1870–1952)
- Addison Webster Moore, (1866–1930)
- G. E. Moore, (1873–1958)^{[a]}^{[b]}^{[c]}^{[d]}^{[e]}
- Gaetano Mosca, (1858–1941)^{[a]}
- John Henry Muirhead, (1855–1940)
- Max Müller, (1823–1900)

== N ==
- Paul Gerhard Natorp, (1854–1924)^{[e]}
- John Neihardt, (1881–1973)
- Leonard Nelson, (1882–1927)
- Otto Neurath, (1882–1945)^{[b]}^{[c]}^{[d]}
- John Henry Newman, (1801–1890)^{[a]}^{[d]}
- H. Richard Niebuhr, (1894–1962)^{[d]}
- Reinhold Niebuhr, (1892–1971)^{[d]}
- Friedrich Nietzsche, (1844–1900)^{[a]}^{[b]}^{[c]}^{[d]}^{[e]}
- Nishi Amane, (1829–1897)^{[d]}
- Nishida Kitaro, (1870–1945)^{[b]}^{[c]}^{[d]}^{[e]}
- Shalva Nutsubidze, (1888–1969)
- Anders Nygren, (1890–1978)^{[d]}

== O ==
- Georges Ohsawa, (1893–1966)
- Karl Olivecrona, (1897–1980)^{[d]}
- John Wood Oman, (1860–1939)^{[d]}
- José Ortega y Gasset, (1883–1955)^{[a]}^{[b]}^{[c]}^{[d]}
- Rudolf Otto, (1869–1937)^{[d]}
- P. D. Ouspensky, (1878–1947)

== P ==
- Vilfredo Pareto, (1848–1923)
- Giuseppe Peano, (1858–1932)^{[b]}^{[c]}
- Benjamin Peirce, (1809–1880)^{[e]}
- Charles Sanders Peirce, (1839–1914)^{[a]}^{[b]}^{[c]}^{[d]}^{[e]}
- Ralph Barton Perry, (1876–1957)^{[a]}^{[b]}^{[c]}
- Leon Petrazycki, (1867–1931)^{[d]}
- Branislav Petronijević, (1875–1954)
- Jean Piaget, (1896–1980)^{[a]}^{[d]}
- Max Planck, (1858–1947)^{[b]}^{[c]}^{[d]}
- Georgi Plekhanov, (1856–1918)^{[a]}^{[b]}^{[c]}^{[d]}
- Konstantin Pobedonostsev, (1827–1907)
- Henri Poincaré, (1854–1912)^{[a]}^{[b]}^{[c]}^{[d]}
- Michael Polanyi, (1891–1976)^{[d]}
- Emil Leon Post, (1897–1954)^{[d]}
- Roscoe Pound, (1870–1964)^{[d]}
- Karl von Prantl, (1820–1888)
- Henry Habberley Price, (1899–1984)^{[b]}^{[c]}
- Harold Arthur Prichard, (1871–1947)^{[a]}^{[b]}^{[c]}^{[d]}
- Pierre-Joseph Proudhon, (1809–1865)^{[a]}^{[b]}^{[c]}^{[d]}

== R ==
- Gustav Radbruch, (1878–1949)^{[d]}
- Sarvepalli Radhakrishnan, (1888–1975)^{[b]}^{[c]}^{[d]}
- Hastings Rashdall, (1858–1924)^{[a]}^{[b]}^{[c]}^{[d]}
- Felix Ravaisson-Mollien, (1813–1900)^{[d]}
- Paul Rée, (1849–1901)^{[b]}^{[c]}
- Wilhelm Reich, (1897–1957)^{[b]}^{[c]}
- Hans Reichenbach, (1891–1953)^{[a]}^{[b]}^{[c]}^{[d]}
- Adolf Reinach, (1883–1917)^{[d]}
- Karl Renner, (1870–1950)^{[d]}
- Charles Bernard Renouvier, (1815–1903)^{[a]}^{[b]}^{[c]}^{[d]}
- I. A. Richards, (1893–1979)
- Heinrich Rickert, (1863–1936)^{[e]}*
- Bernhard Riemann, (1826–1866)
- George Croom Robertson, (1842–1892)
- Erwin Rohde, (1845–1898)
- Francisco Romero, (1891–1962)^{[b]}^{[c]}
- Johann Karl Friedrich Rosenkranz, (1805–1879)
- Franz Rosenzweig, (1886–1929)^{[a]}^{[b]}^{[c]}^{[d]}
- Alf Niels Christian Ross, (1899–1979)^{[d]}
- William David Ross, (1877–1971)^{[a]}^{[b]}^{[c]}^{[d]}
- Josiah Royce, (1855–1916)^{[a]}^{[b]}^{[c]}^{[d]}^{[e]}
- Vasily Rozanov, (1856–1919)^{[d]}
- Arnold Ruge, (1802–1880)^{[d]}
- Bertrand Russell, (1872–1970)^{[a]}^{[b]}^{[c]}^{[d]}^{[e]}

== S ==
- Émile Saisset, (1814–1863)
- George Santayana, (1863–1952)^{[a]}^{[b]}^{[c]}^{[d]}^{[e]}
- Ferdinand de Saussure, (1857–1913)^{[a]}^{[d]}
- Max Scheler, (1874–1928)^{[a]}^{[b]}^{[c]}^{[d]}
- F. C. S. Schiller, (1864–1937)^{[d]}
- Moritz Schlick, (1882–1936)^{[b]}^{[c]}^{[d]}
- Carl Schmitt, (1888–1985)^{[d]}
- Erwin Schrödinger, (1887–1961)^{[a]}
- Joseph Schumpeter, (1883–1950)^{[d]}
- Alfred Schütz, (1899–1959)^{[b]}^{[c]}^{[d]}^{[e]}
- Albert Schweizer, (1875–1965)
- Charles Secrétan, (1815–1895)
- Roy Wood Sellars, (1880–1973)^{[b]}^{[c]}
- Lev Shestov, (1866–1938)^{[d]}
- Gustav Gustavovich Shpet, (1879–1937)^{[a]}^{[d]}
- Henry Sidgwick, (1838–1900)^{[a]}^{[b]}^{[c]}^{[d]}^{[e]}
- Georg Simmel, (1858–1918)^{[a]}^{[d]}
- Thoralf Skolem, (1887–1963)^{[a]}
- Vladimir Solovyov, (1853–1900)^{[a]}^{[b]}^{[c]}^{[d]}
- Georges Sorel, (1847–1922)^{[a]}^{[b]}^{[c]}^{[d]}
- William Ritchie Sorley, (1855–1935)
- Othmar Spann, (1878–1950)
- Herbert Spencer, (1820–1903)^{[a]}^{[b]}^{[c]}^{[d]}^{[e]}
- Thomas Spencer Baynes, (1823–1887)
- Oswald Spengler, (1880–1936)
- Afrikan Spir, (1837–1890)^{[a]}
- Lysander Spooner, (1808–1887)
- Walter Terence Stace, (1886–1967)
- Henry Stanton, (1805–1887)
- Olaf Stapledon, (1886–1950)
- L. Susan Stebbing, (1885–1943)
- Edith Stein, (1891–1942)
- Rudolf Steiner, (1861–1925)^{[a]}^{[d]}
- Leslie Stephen, (1832–1904)^{[a]}
- James Hutchison Stirling, (1820–1909)
- Max Stirner, (1806–1856)^{[a]}^{[b]}^{[c]}^{[d]}^{[e]}
- George Frederick Stout, (1860–1944)^{[a]}^{[b]}^{[c]}
- David Friedrich Strauss, (1808–1874)^{[d]}
- Leo Strauss, (1899–1973)^{[d]}
- Carl Stumpf, (1848–1936)
- James Sully, (1842–1923)
- Sun Yat-sen, (1866–1925)^{[a]}

== T ==
- Debendranath Tagore, (1817–1905)
- Rabindranath Tagore, (1861–1941)^{[b]}^{[c]}^{[d]}
- Hippolyte Taine, (1828–1893)^{[d]}
- T'an Ssu-t'ung, (1864–1898)^{[a]}
- Tanabe Hajime, (1885–1962)^{[b]}^{[c]}^{[d]}
- Władysław Tatarkiewicz, (1886–1980)
- Harriet Taylor Mill, (1807–1858)^{[a]}^{[d]}^{[e]}
- Gustav Teichmuller (1837–1888)^{[a]}
- Pierre Teilhard de Chardin, (1881–1955)^{[a]}^{[d]}
- William Temple, (1881–1944)^{[d]}
- Frederick Robert Tennant, (1866–1957)^{[d]}
- Henry David Thoreau, (1817–1862)^{[a]}^{[b]}^{[c]}^{[d]}^{[e]}
- Paul Tillich, (1886–1965)^{[a]}^{[d]}
- Alexis de Tocqueville, (1805–1859)^{[d]}
- Leo Tolstoy, (1828–1910)^{[d]}
- Friedrich Adolf Trendelenburg, (1802–1872)
- Ernst Troeltsch, (1865–1923)^{[a]}^{[d]}
- Leon Trotsky, (1879–1940)^{[b]}^{[c]}^{[d]}
- Benjamin Tucker, (1854–1939)
- Kazimierz Twardowski, (1866–1938)^{[b]}^{[c]}^{[d]}

== U ==
- Pietro Ubaldi, (1886–1972)
- Hermann Ulrici, (1806–1884)
- Miguel de Unamuno, (1864–1936)^{[a]}^{[b]}^{[c]}^{[d]}
- Dimitri Uznadze, (1886–1950)

== V ==
- Hans Vaihinger, (1852–1933)^{[a]}^{[b]}^{[c]}^{[d]}
- John Veitch, (1829–1894)
- John Venn, (1834–1923)^{[d]}
- Milan Vidmar, (1885–1962)
- Lev Vygotsky, (1896–1934)^{[b]}^{[c]}^{[d]}
- Boris Petrovich Vysheslavtsev, (1877–1954)^{[d]}

== W ==
- Jean Wahl, (1888–1974)
- Friedrich Waismann, (1896–1959)
- Alfred Russel Wallace, (1823–1913)^{[d]}
- James Ward, (1843–1925)^{[a]}
- John B. Watson, (1878–1958)^{[b]}^{[c]}
- Watsuji Tetsuro, (1889–1960)^{[b]}^{[c]}^{[d]}^{[e]}
- Max Weber, (1864–1920)^{[a]}^{[b]}^{[c]}^{[d]}^{[e]}*
- Otto Weininger, (1880–1903)
- Christian Hermann Weisse, (1801–1866)
- Victoria, Lady Welby, (1837–1912)
- Felix Weltsch, (1884–1964)
- Edvard Westermarck, (1862–1939)^{[a]}
- Hermann Weyl, (1885–1955)^{[d]}
- Frantisek Weyr (or Franz Weyr), (1879–1951)^{[d]}
- Alfred North Whitehead, (1861–1947)^{[a]}^{[b]}^{[c]}^{[d]}^{[e]}
- Wilhelm Windelband, (1848–1915)^{[a]}^{[e]}*
- Stanislaw Ignacy Witkiewicz, (1885–1939)
- Ludwig Wittgenstein, (1889–1951)^{[a]}^{[b]}^{[c]}^{[d]}^{[e]}
- Woo Tsin-hang (or Chih-hui), (1865–1953)
- Chauncey Wright, (1830–1875)^{[a]}^{[b]}^{[c]}^{[e]}
- Dorothy Maud Wrinch, (1894–1976)
- Wilhelm Wundt, (1832–1920)^{[a]}^{[d]}^{[e]}*

== Z ==
- Peter Wessel Zapffe, (1899–1990)
- Eduard Zeller, (1814–1908)
- Ernst Zermelo, (1871–1953)^{[d]}
- Zhang Dongsun, (1886–1973)
- Florian Znaniecki, (1882–1958)
- Xavier Zubiri, (1889–1983)

== See also ==
- Lists of philosophers
- 19th-century philosophy
- List of philosophers born in the centuries BC
- List of philosophers born in the 1st through 10th centuries
- List of philosophers born in the 11th through 14th centuries
- List of philosophers born in the 15th and 16th centuries
- List of philosophers born in the 17th century
- List of philosophers born in the 18th century
- List of philosophers born in the 20th century
