= Broder Christiansen =

German philosopher and linguist (1869-1958)

Broder Christiansen (pseudonym: Uve Jens Kruse, Hans Tor Straaten; born July 9, 1869 in Klixbüll, North Frisia - June 6, 1958 in Gauting near Munich) was a German philosopher and linguist. He published on philosophy, art, language teaching, life coaching, and graphology. He gained importance in the philosophy of art and in the teaching of good German style. As a philosopher he was close to Neo-Kantianism and belonged to the Southwest German School. His work combines philosophy with practical life. It was particularly adopted by Russian formalism.

== Publications ==
- Das Urteil bei Descartes. Diss. Freiburg im Breisgau 1902. – Das Urteil bei Descartes. Ein Beitrag zur Vorgeschichte der Erkenntnistheorie. Clauss und Feddersen, Hanau 1902. 107 S.
- Erkenntnistheorie und Psychologie des Erkennens. Clauss und Feddersen, Hanau 1902. 48 S.
- Philosophie der Kunst. Clauss und Feddersen, Hanau 1909 (Reprint. Elibron Classics, New York 2002, ISBN 978-0-543-63343-9 und ISBN 978-0-543-63342-2) und B. Behr’s Verlag Friedrich Feddersen, Berlin-Steglitz 1912. 348 S. – Filosofija iskusstva. Übersetzung ins Russische von Georgij Petrović Fedotov unter der Redaktion von V. Aničkov. Sankt Petersburg 1911. – Uns. Di Filosofye fun Uns. Übersetzung ins Jiddische. Farlag Heim, New York 1920.
- Kantkritik. 1. Teil. Kritik der kantischen Erkenntnislehre. B. Behr’s Verlag Friedrich Feddersen, Berlin-Steglitz 1912. 177 S.
- Das ästhetische Urphänomen. LOGOS – Internationale Zeitschrift für Philosophie der Kultur (Hrsg. Georg Mehlis), Band II. J.C.B. Mohr (Paul Siebeck), Tübingen 1912. S. 303–315.
- Vom Selbstbewusstsein – 1. Teil: Von der Seele. B. Behr’s Verlag Friedrich Feddersen, Berlin 1912. 87 S.
- Die Kunst des Schreibens. Eine Prosa-Schule. Felsen-Verlag, Buchenbach in Baden 1918. 461 S. – Die kleine Prosaschule. Felsen-Verlag, München um 1935. 190 S. – Eine Prosaschule. Neu bearbeitete Ausgabe. Reclam-Verlag, Stuttgart 1949. 264 S. – Eine Prosaschule. Die Kunst des Schreibens. Neue, erweiterte Fassung. Reclam-Verlag, Stuttgart 1956. 368 S.
- Ich will! – Ich kann! Eine Schule des Willens und der Persönlichkeit (unter Pseudonym). Felsen-Verlag, Buchenbach in Baden 1918. 154 S.
- Lebenskunst. Ein Wegweiser für die neue Zeit (unter Pseudonym). Felsen-Verlag, Buchenbach in Baden 1918. 117 S.
- Die Redeschule (unter wirklichem Namen und unter Pseudonym). Felsen-Verlag, Buchenbach-Baden 1920. 210 S.
- Gedächtnisschule (unter Pseudonym). Felsen-Verlag, Buchenbach-Baden 1920. 89 S.
- Das Büchlein zum guten Schlaf (unter Pseudonym). Felsen-Verlag, Buchenbach-Baden 1920. 28 S.
- Der Kruse-Tag (unter Pseudonym). Felsen-Verlag, Buchenbach-Baden 1921. 28 S.
- Ein Kompass zur Menschenkenntnis (unter Pseudonym und mit Herbert von Bomsdorff-Bergen). Felsen-Verlag, Buchenbach-Baden 1922. 82 S.
- Der Kopfarbeiter (unter Pseudonym und mit Kurt Kauffmann). 2. Auflage. Felsen-Verlag, Buchenbach-Baden 1922. 132 S. – The Brain-Workers' Handbook. Ins Englische translated von Frederick H. Burgess und Herbert N. Casson. The Efficiency Magazine, London um 1928.
- Wege zum Erfolg. Leipzig 1929. 183 S.
- Das Gesicht unserer Zeit. Felsen-Verlag, Buchenbach in Baden 1929. 114 S. – Het aspect van onzen tijd. Übersetzung ins Niederländische von Jan van Kasteel. Van Loghum Slaterus, Arnhem 1930.
- Die Kunst. Felsen-Verlag, Buchenbach i. Br. 1930. 260 S.
- Die Technik des Erfolgs (unter Pseudonym). Felsen-Verlag, München 1931.
- Neue Grundlegung der Graphologie (mit Elisabeth Carnap). Felsen-Verlag, München 1933. 96 S. – Lehrbuch der Handschriftendeutung. Mit sechsundvierzig Tafeln als Anhang. 2. erweiterte Auflage. Reclam-Verlag, Stuttgart 1947. 197 S. – Lehrbuch der Graphologie. Neu bearbeitete Ausgabe. Reclam-Verlag, Stuttgart 1955. 134 S.
- Der neue Gott. Felsen-Verlag, München 1934. 176 S.
- Das Lebensbuch oder Von den Wegen der Persönlichkeit. Alte und neue Lebenserfahrungen (als Hrsg.). Wilhelm Langewische-Brandt (in der Reihe „Die kleinen Bücher der Rose“), Ebenhausen bei München 1935. 172 S.
- Wege zum Erfolg. Verlag Philipp Reclam Jun., Leipzig 1941.
- Willensfreiheit. Reclam-Verlag, Stuttgart 1947. 64 S.
- Plane und lebe erfolgreich. Paul List Verlag, München 1954. 163 S.
- Lebendige Weisheit alter und neuer Zeit. Stuttgart 1954. 163 S.
- Ist die Grabinschrift Rilkes wirklich ein Rätsel? Du, Band 17, Nr. 8. Verlag Conzett & Huber, Zürich 1957.
