= Rosario Assunto =

Italian philosopher (1901–1990)

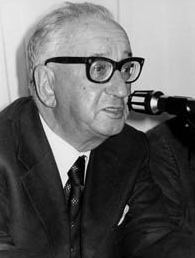
- Born: 28 March 1915; Caltanissetta, Kingdom of Italy
- Died: 24 January 1994 (aged 78); Rome, Italy

Philosophical work
- Era: 20th-century philosophy
- Region: Western Philosophy
- School: Aesthetics: Italian philosophy

Rosario Assunto (Italian: [roˈzaːrjo asˈsunto]; 28 March 1915 – 24 January 1994) was an Italian philosopher, he was an Art theorist and landscape aesthetician.

== Life ==
Rosario Assunto was born in 1915 in the same building next to the Church of Santa Lucia, in the historic center of Caltanissetta, where also Pier Maria Rosso di San Secondo was born in 1887. He received his doctorate in jurisprudence in 1938, but then began a teaching career. From 1944 to 1951 he studied philosophy with the "critical ontologist" and specialist of Kant's philosophy Pantaleo Carabellese (1877–1948) at the Sapienza University of Rome. He became an assistant to Carabellese and, after his death in 1948, to Luigi Scaravelli an Italian philosopher (1894–1957). In 1955 he became a private lecturer and from 1968 to 1980 he was professor of aesthetics at the University of Urbino.

In 1981 he moved to Rome, where he taught as a professor of the history of Italian philosophy. As an elitist individualist, he remained aloof from the movimento del Sessantotto and withdrew from public discussion since the 1970s. The increasing dominance of language and sign theory approaches in philosophy also contributed to this, making Assunto's positions appear out of date.

In 1991 all his work on gardens and landscapes and his positions in favor of their recognition were rewarded with the Carlo Scarpa International Prize for the Garden, awarded by the Benetton Studi Ricerche Foundation of Treviso. He fought a battle of ideas for good governance, care and defense of the gardens; for the affirmation of their irreplaceable value as heritage of memory and places designed and created to experience contemplation.

Assunto maintained numerous contacts with avant-garde artists. He was married to the art historian Wanda Gaeta, who died early; he died the 24 January 1994 for a tumor.

== Thought ==
A focus of his work was landscape aesthetics. In Il paesaggio e l'estetica (1973) Assunto shows that people search for and create their own landscape, both physically and spiritually. In several works he develops a theory of the garden. He was influenced by the German romantic view of nature. In Ipotesi e postille sull'estetica medioevale (1975) he deals with Dante's poetry. Intervengono i personaggi (col permesso degli autori) (1977) is a collection of satirical-philosophical stories.

The theme of the relationship between nature and art was the focus of his research, he systematically posed and articulated the problem of the specificity of the constitutive values of the landscape, to the point of making clear the reasons for the "modern cult of the garden". Furthermore, he also took care of his writing activity for an audience of non-experts.

Assunto distinguishes between vertical (anagogic) and horizontal significance. Vertical is the exploration of the past and the depths of the soul, which gives meaning to the present. Horizontally (socially or historically) significant is the reference to other parts of the world, to the polis, social life, the world of institutions. Examples of this are the art and literature of surrealism, which seeks to change the world, or the works of Bertolt Brecht and Luigi Pirandello, the Italian film of neorealism, but also any literature that refers to philosophical questions and thus goes beyond itself.

== Works ==
- Teatro, cinematografo e radio, in "Civiltà fascista", a. VII, n. 1, gennaio 1940.
- Il teatro nell'estetica di Platone, in "Rivista italiana del teatro", n. 4, 1943.
- Curatela di Heinrich von Kleist, Michele Kohlhaas, Torino, Einaudi, 1946.
- Essere e valore nella filosofia di C. A. Sacheli, in "Rivista di storia della filosofia", a. II, fasc. 3–4, 1947.
- L'educazione estetica, Milano, Viola, 1950.
- Educazione pubblica e privata, Milano, Viola, 1950.
- La pedagogia greca, Milano, Viola, 1952.
- Forma e destino, Milano, Edizioni di comunità, 1957.
- L'integrazione estetica. Studi e ricerche, Milano, Edizioni di comunità, 1959.
- Teoremi e problemi di estetica contemporanea. Con una premessa kantiana, Milano, Feltrinelli, 1960.
- La critica d'arte nel pensiero medioevale, Milano, Il saggiatore, 1961.
- Estetica dell'identità. Lettura della Filosofia dell'arte di Schelling, Urbino, STEU, 1962.
- Giudizio estetico, critica e censura. Meditazioni e indagini, Firenze, La nuova Italia, 1963.
- Die Theorie des Schönen in Mittelalter, Koln, DuMont, 1963.
- Stagioni e ragioni nell'estetica del Settecento, Milano, Mursia, 1967.
- L'automobile di Mallarmé e altri ragionamenti intorno alla vocazione odierna delle arti, Roma, Ateneo, 1968.
- L'estetica di Immanuel Kant, una antologia dagli scritti a cura di, Torino, Loescher, 1971.
- Hegel nostro contemporaneo, con Raffaello Franchini e Mario Pensa, Roma, Unione italiana per il progresso della cultura, 1971.
- Il paesaggio e l'estetica

I, Natura e storia, Napoli, Giannini, 1973.
II, Arte, critica e filosofia, Napoli, Giannini, 1973.

- L'antichità come futuro. Studio sull'estetica del neoclassicismo europeo, Milano, Mursia, 1973.
- Ipotesi e postille sull'estetica medioevale. Con alcuni rilievi su Dante teorizzatore della poesia, Milano, Marzorati, 1975.
- Libertà e fondazione estetica. Quattro studi filosofici, Roma, Bulzoni, 1975.
- Intervengono i personaggi (col permesso degli autori), Napoli, Società editrice napoletana, 1977 (nuova edizione: Torino, Aragno, 2019, con una postfazione di E. Cutinelli-Rendina).
- Specchio vivente del mondo. Artisti stranieri in Roma, 1600–1800, Roma, De Luca, 1978.
- Alfred Hohenegger. Esploratore del possibile, con Gustav René Hocke e Elio Mercuri, Roma, De Luca, 1979.
- Infinita contemplazione. Gusto e filosofia dell'Europa barocca, Napoli, Società editrice napoletana, 1979.
- Filosofia del giardino e filosofia nel giardino. Saggi di teoria e storia dell'estetica, Roma, Bulzoni, 1981.
- La città di Anfione e la città di Prometeo. Idea e poetiche della città, Milano, Jaca book, 1984. ISBN 88-16-40120-6.
- La parola anteriore come parola ulteriore, Bologna, il Mulino, 1984. ISBN 88-15-00645-1.
- Il parterre e i ghiacciai. Tre saggi di estetica sul paesaggio del Settecento, Palermo, Novecento, 1984. ISBN 88-373-0012-3.
- Verità e bellezza nelle estetiche e nelle poetiche dell'Italia neoclassica e primoromantica, Roma, Quasar, 1984. ISBN 88-85020-48-8.
- Ontologia e teleologia del giardino, Milano, Guerini, 1988. ISBN 88-7802-026-5.
- Leopardi e la nuova Atlantide, Napoli, Istituto Suor Orsola Benincasa-Edizioni scientifiche italiane, 1988. ISBN 88-7104-060-0.
- La natura, le arti, la storia. Esercizi di estetica, Milano, Guerini studio, 1990. ISBN 88-7802-163-6.
- Giardini e rimpatrio. Un itinerario ricco di fascino attraverso le ville di Roma, in compagnia di Winckelmann, di Stendhal, dei Nazareni, di D'Annunzio, Roma, Newton Compton, 1991. ISBN 88-7780-683-4.
- La bellezza come assoluto, l'assoluto come bellezza. Tre conversazioni a due o più voci, Palermo, Novecento, 1993. ISBN 88-373-0182-0.
- Il sentimento e il tempo, antologia a cura di Giuseppe Brescia, Andria, Grafiche Guglielmi, 1997.
- L’antichità come futuro. Studio sull’estetica del neoclassicismo europeo, Edizioni Medusa, Milano 20202, introduzione Fabrizio Desideri. ISBN 978-88-88130-088.

== Selected bibliography ==
- Marisa, Sedita Migliore (2000). Il giardino: mito estetico di Rosario Assunto. Società Dante Alighieri.
- Calvano, Teresa (1996). Viaggio nel pittoresco (in Italian). Donzelli Editore. pp. 139–. ISBN 978-88-7989-218-6.
- Claudia Cassatella; Enrica Dall'Ara; Maristella Storti (2007). L'opportunità dell'innovazione. Firenze University Press. pp. 191–. ISBN 978-88-8453-564-1.
- Francesca Marzotto Caotorta (2011). All'ombra delle farfalle. Il giardino e le sue storie. Edizioni Mondadori. pp. 207–. ISBN 978-88-04-61114-1.
- Domenico Luciani (2001). Luoghi, forma e vita di giardini e di paesaggi: Premio internazionale Carlo Scarpa per il giardino, 1990–1999. Fondazione Benetton Studi Ricerche. ISBN 978-88-8409-013-3. * Valsecchi, Pier Fausto Bagatti; Kipar, Andreas (1996). Il giardino paesaggistico tra Settecento e Ottocento in Italia e in Germania (in German). Milano: Guerini e Associati. ISBN 978-88-7802-665-0.
- Emanuele Cutinelli-Rendina, Il Sessantotto di Rosario Assunto (con un carteggio inedito), in «Ventunesimo secolo», VI (2009), pp. 45–57.
- Emanuele Cutinelli-Rendina, Tra etica ed estetica: Rosario Assunto elzevirista, in Gesualdo Bufalino e la tradizione dell’elzeviro, a cura di Nunzio Zago, Comiso, Euno Edizioni – Fondazione Gesualdo Bufalino, 2019, pp. 167–84.
