= List of philosophers born in the 18th century =

Philosophers born in the 18th century (and others important in the history of philosophy), listed alphabetically:

Note: This list has a minimal criterion for inclusion and the relevance to philosophy of some individuals on the list is disputed.

== A ==
- Jacob Friedrich von Abel, (1751–1829)
- John Abercrombie, (1780–1844)^{[f]}
- Johann Heinrich Abicht, (1762–1816)
- John Adams, (1735–1826)
- Francesco Algarotti, (1712–1764)
- Archibald Alison, (1757–1839)^{[d]}
- John Allen, (1771–1843)^{[f]}
- Anton Wilhelm Amo, (1703 – c. 1759)^{[d]}
- Robert Aspland, (1782–1845)^{[f]}
- Georg Anton Friedrich Ast, (1778–1841)
- John Austin, (1790–1859)^{[a]}^{[b]}^{[c]}^{[d]}^{[e]}^{[f]}
- Pierre Hyacinthe Azais, (1766–1845)

== B ==
- Franz Xaver von Baader, (1765–1841)
- Charles Babbage, (1791–1871)^{[a]}^{[f]}
- Samuel Bailey, (1791–1870)^{[f]}
- Pierre-Simon Ballanche, (1776–1847)
- John Ballantyne, (1778–1830)^{[f]}
- Christoph Gottfried Bardili, (1761–1808)
- Alexander Gottlieb Baumgarten, (1714–1762)^{[a]}^{[d]}
- James Beattie, (1735–1803)^{[a]}^{[d]}
- Cesare, Marquis of Beccaria, (1738–1794)^{[a]}
- Jacob Sigismund Beck, (1761–1840)^{[d]}
- Charles Bell, (1774–1842)^{[f]}
- Thomas Belsham, (1750–1829)^{[f]}
- William Belsham, (1752–1829)^{[f]}
- Friedrich Eduard Beneke, (1798–1854)^{[a]}
- Jeremy Bentham, (1748–1832)^{[a]}^{[b]}^{[c]}^{[d]}
- William Blackstone, (1723–1780)^{[d]}
- Hugh Blair, (1718–1800)^{[d]}
- William Blake, (1757–1827)^{[f]}
- Robert Blakey, (1795–1878)^{[f]}
- Bernard Bolzano, (1781–1848)^{[a]}^{[b]}^{[c]}^{[d]}^{[e]}*
- Louis Gabriel Ambroise de Bonald, (1754–1840)
- Charles Bonnet, (1720–1793)^{[d]}
- Rudjer Boscovich, (1711–1787)^{[a]}
- David Brewster, (1781–1868)^{[f]}
- Jean Anthelme Brillat-Savarin, (1755–1826)^{[b]}^{[c]}
- Benjamin Collins Brodie, (1783–1862)^{[f]}
- Henry Brougham, (1778–1868)^{[f]}
- Thomas Brown, (1778–1820)^{[d]}^{[f]}
- Robert Buchanan, (1786–1873)^{[f]}
- Georges-Louis Leclerc, Comte de Buffon, (1707–1788)^{[d]}
- William Burdon, (1764–1818)^{[f]}
- Edmund Burke, (1729–1797)^{[a]}^{[b]}^{[c]}^{[d]}^{[e]}
- Lawrence Butterworth, (1740–1828)^{[f]}

== C ==
- Pierre Jean George Cabanis, (1757–1808)^{[d]}
- George Campbell, (1719–1796)^{[d]}
- Thomas Carlyle, (1795–1881)^{[a]}^{[d]}
- Petr Iakovlevich Chaadev, (1794–1856)^{[d]}
- Heinrich Moritz Chalybäus, (1796–1862)
- Chang Hsueh-ch'eng (or Zhang Xuecheng), (1738–1801)^{[a]}
- Tasan Chông Yagyong, (1762–1836)^{[d]}
- Samuel Taylor Coleridge, (1772–1834)^{[b]}^{[c]}^{[d]}
- Auguste Comte, (1798–1857)^{[a]}^{[b]}^{[c]}^{[d]}
- Étienne Bonnot de Condillac, (1715–1780)^{[a]}^{[b]}^{[c]}^{[d]}^{[e]}
- Marquis de Condorcet, (1743–1794)^{[a]}^{[c]}^{[d]}
- Benjamin Constant, (1767–1830)^{[a]}^{[b]}^{[c]}^{[d]}
- Victor Cousin, (1792–1867)^{[a]}^{[d]}
- Johann Ulrich von Cramer, (1706–1772)
- Christian August Crusius, (1715–1775)^{[a]}^{[d]}

== D ==
- Jean le Rond d'Alembert, (1717–1783)^{[a]}^{[b]}^{[c]}^{[d]}
- Joseph de Maistre, (1753–1821)^{[a]}^{[b]}^{[c]}
- Emerich de Vattel, (1714–1767)
- Denis Diderot, (1713–1784)^{[a]}^{[b]}^{[c]}^{[d]}
- Émilie du Châtelet, (1706–1749)^{[d]}

== E ==
- Johann Augustus Eberhard, (1739–1809)^{[d]}
- Jonathan Edwards, (1703–1758)^{[a]}^{[b]}^{[c]}^{[d]}^{[e]}

== F ==
- Adam Ferguson, (1723–1816)^{[a]}^{[b]}^{[c]}^{[d]}
- Johann Gottlieb Fichte, (1762–1814)^{[a]}^{[b]}^{[c]}^{[d]}^{[e]}
- Immanuel Hermann Fichte, (1797–1879)
- David Fordyce, (1711–1751)^{[a]}
- Charles Fourier, (1772–1837)^{[a]}
- Benjamin Franklin, (1706–1790)^{[b]}^{[c]}^{[d]}
- Jakob Friedrich Fries, (1773–1843)^{[d]}

== G ==
- Alexander Gerard, (1728–1795)^{[d]}
- Giacinto Sigismondo Gerdil, (1718–1802)^{[d]}
- Thomas Gisbourne, (1758–1846)
- William Godwin, (1756–1836)^{[a]}^{[b]}^{[c]}^{[d]}^{[e]}
- Johann Wolfgang von Goethe, (1749–1832)^{[a]}^{[b]}^{[c]}^{[d]}
- George Grote, (1794–1871)

== H ==
- Johann Georg Hamann, (1730–1788)^{[a]}^{[d]}^{[e]}
- Sir William Hamilton, (1788–1856)^{[a]}^{[b]}^{[c]}^{[d]}^{[f]}
- Renn Dickson Hampden, (1793–1868)^{[f]}
- David Hartley, (1705–1757)^{[a]}^{[b]}^{[c]}^{[d]}^{[e]}
- Julius Charles Hare, (1795–1855)^{[f]}
- Graves Chamney Haughton, (1788–1849)^{[f]}
- Laetitia Matilda Hawkins, (1759–1851)^{[f]}
- David Ramsay Hay, (1798–1866)^{[f]}
- Mary Hays, (1760–1843)^{[f]}
- Francis Haywood, (1798–1858)^{[f]}
- William Hazlitt, (1778–1830)^{[f]}
- G.W.F. Hegel, (1770–1831)^{[a]}^{[b]}^{[c]}^{[d]}^{[e]}
- Claude Adrien Helvétius, (1715–1771)^{[a]}^{[b]}^{[c]}^{[d]}
- Johann Friedrich Herbart, (1776–1841)^{[a]}^{[d]}
- Johann Gottfried Herder, (1744–1803)^{[a]}^{[b]}^{[c]}^{[d]}^{[e]}
- John Herschel, (1792–1871)^{[f]}
- Samuel Heywood, (1753–1828)^{[f]}
- Laurens Perseus Hickok, (1798–1888)
- Hermann Friedrich Wilhelm Hinrichs, (1794–1861)
- Thomas Hodgskin, (1787–1869)^{[f]}
- Josef Hoëné-Wronski, (1778–1853)
- Baron d'Holbach, (1723–1789)^{[a]}^{[b]}^{[c]}^{[e]}
- Friedrich Hölderlin, (1770–1843)^{[a]}^{[d]}
- John Hoppus, (1789–1875)^{[f]}
- Wilhelm von Humboldt, (1767–1835)^{[a]}^{[b]}^{[c]}^{[d]}^{[e]}*
- David Hume, (1711–1776)^{[a]}^{[b]}^{[c]}^{[d]}^{[e]}

== J ==
- Friedrich Heinrich Jacobi, (1743–1819)^{[a]}^{[b]}^{[c]}^{[d]}^{[e]}
- Thomas Jefferson, (1743–1826)^{[b]}^{[c]}^{[d]}
- Alexander Bryan Johnson, (1786–1867)^{[d]}
- Dr. Samuel Johnson, (1709–1784)^{[b]}^{[c]}^{[d]}
- Théodore Simon Jouffroy, (1796–1842)

== K ==
- Theophilos Kairis (1784–1853)
- Immanuel Kant, (1724–1804)^{[a]}^{[b]}^{[c]}^{[d]}^{[e]}*
- Heinrich von Kleist, (1777–1811)^{[a]}
- Richard Payne Knight, (1750–1824)
- Martin Knutzen, (1713–1751)^{[d]}
- Hugo Kołłątaj, (1750–1812)
- Karl Christian Friedrich Krause, (1781–1832)^{[a]}^{[d]}
- Nachman Krochmal, (1785–1840)^{[d]}
- Wilhelm Traugott Krug, (1770–1842)

== L ==
- Julien Offray de La Mettrie, (1709–1751)^{[a]}^{[b]}^{[c]}^{[d]}
- Jean-Baptiste Lamarck, (1744–1829)^{[b]}^{[c]}
- Johann Heinrich Lambert, (1728–1777)^{[a]}^{[d]}
- Lamennais, (1752–1854)
- Pierre-Simon Laplace, (1749–1827)^{[a]}^{[b]}^{[c]}
- Pierre Laromiguière, (1756–1837)
- Giacomo Leopardi, (1798–1837)
- Pierre Leroux, (1798–1871)^{[a]}
- Gotthold Ephraim Lessing, (1729–1781)^{[a]}^{[b]}^{[c]}^{[d]}
- Georg Christoph Lichtenberg, (1742–1799)^{[b]}^{[c]}^{[d]}
- Carl Linnaeus, (1707–1778)^{[d]}

== M ==
- Gabriel Bonnot de Mably, (1709–1785)
- Salomon Maimon (or Salomon ben Joshua), (1753–1800)^{[a]}^{[d]}^{[e]}
- Maine de Biran, (1766–1824)^{[b]}^{[c]}^{[d]}
- Moses Mendelssohn, (1729–1786)^{[a]}^{[b]}^{[c]}^{[d]}^{[e]}
- James Mill, (1773–1836)^{[a]}^{[b]}^{[c]}^{[d]}^{[e]}
- John Millar, (1735–1801)^{[d]}
- Lord Monboddo (or James Burnett), (1714–1799)^{[d]}
- Motoori Norinaga, (1730–1801)^{[d]}

== N ==
- Novalis, (1772–1801)^{[a]}

== O ==
- Lorenz Oken, (1779–1851)^{[d]}
- James Oswald, (1703–1793)^{[d]}

== P ==
- Thomas Paine, (1737–1809)^{[a]}^{[b]}^{[c]}^{[d]}
- William Paley, (1743–1805)^{[a]}^{[d]}
- Thomas Percival, (1740–1804)^{[a]}
- Issac de Pinto, (1715–1787)
- Richard Price, (1723–1791)^{[a]}^{[b]}^{[c]}^{[d]}
- Joseph Priestley, (1733–1804)^{[a]}^{[b]}^{[c]}^{[d]}

== R ==
- Daniel Raymond, (1786–1849)
- August Wilhelm Rehberg, (fl. late 18th century)^{[e]}*
- Thomas Reid, (1710–1796)^{[a]}^{[b]}^{[c]}^{[d]}^{[e]}
- Karl Leonhard Reinhold, (1757–1823)^{[a]}^{[d]}^{[e]}
- David Ricardo, (1772–1823)
- Antonio Rosmini-Serbati, (1797–1855)^{[a]}^{[d]}^{[e]}
- Jean Jacques Rousseau, (1712–1778)^{[a]}^{[b]}^{[c]}^{[d]}
- Claude Henri de Rouvroy, Comte de Saint-Simon, (1760–1825)
- Pierre Paul Royer-Collard, (1763–1845)

== S ==
- Mulla Hadi Sabzevari, (1797–1873)^{[d]}
- Marquis de Sade, (1740–1814)^{[a]}
- Claude Henri de Rouvroy, Comte de Saint-Simon, (1760–1825)^{[a]}^{[b]}^{[c]}^{[d]}
- Friedrich Carl von Savigny, (1779–1861)^{[d]}
- Friedrich Schelling, (1775–1852)^{[a]}^{[b]}^{[c]}^{[d]}^{[e]}
- Friedrich Schiller, (1759–1805)^{[a]}^{[b]}^{[c]}^{[d]}
- Friedrich von Schlegel, (1772–1829)^{[a]}^{[c]}^{[d]}^{[e]}*
- Friedrich Schleiermacher, (1768–1834)^{[a]}^{[c]}^{[d]}^{[e]}
- Arthur Schopenhauer, (1788–1860)^{[a]}^{[b]}^{[c]}^{[d]}^{[e]}
- Gottlob Ernst Schulze, (1761–1833)^{[a]}
- Shah Wali Allah (or Qutb al-Din Ahmad al-Rahim or Waliullah), (1703–1762)^{[d]}
- Lady Mary Shepherd, (1777–1847)^{[a]}
- Heinrich Christoph Wilhelm Sigwart, (1789–1844)
- Hryhori Skovoroda, (1722–1794)^{[d]}
- Adam Smith, (1723–1790)^{[a]}^{[b]}^{[c]}^{[d]}
- Jan Sniadecki, (1756–1830)
- Karl Wilhelm Ferdinand Solger, (1780–1890)
- Anne Louise Germaine de Staël, (1766–1817)^{[d]}
- Stanisław Staszic, (1755–1826)
- Dugald Stewart, (1753–1828)^{[b]}^{[c]}^{[d]}

== T ==
- Tai Chen (or Dai Zhen or Tai Tung-Yuan), (1724–1777)^{[a]}^{[d]}
- Johannes Nikolaus Tetens, (1736–1807)^{[a]}^{[d]}
- William Thompson, (1775–1833)
- Tominaga Nakamoto, (1715–1746)^{[d]}
- Abraham Tucker, (1705–1774)^{[d]}

== V ==
- Emerich de Vattel, (1714–1767)
- Vauvenargues, (1715–1747)^{[a]}

== W ==
- William Whewell, (1794–1866)^{[a]}^{[b]}^{[c]}^{[d]}^{[e]}
- John Witherspoon, (1723–1794)^{[d]}
- Mary Wollstonecraft, (1759–1797)^{[a]}^{[b]}^{[c]}^{[d]}

== Y ==
- Yü Cheng-hsieh, (1775–1840)

== See also ==
- List of philosophers
- 18th-century philosophy
- List of philosophers born in the centuries BC
- List of philosophers born in the 1st through 10th centuries
- List of philosophers born in the 11th through 14th centuries
- List of philosophers born in the 15th and 16th centuries
- List of philosophers born in the 17th century
- List of philosophers born in the 19th century
- List of philosophers born in the 20th century
