= List of philosophers born in the 17th century =

Philosophers born in the 17th century (and others important in the history of philosophy), listed alphabetically:

Note: This list has a minimal criterion for inclusion and the relevance to philosophy of some individuals on the list is disputed.

== A ==
- Firmin Abauzit, (1679–1767)
- Yves Marie André, (1675–1764)
- Antoine Arnauld, (1612–1694)12*
- Mary Astell, (1666–1731)

== B ==
- John Balguy, (1686–1748)
- Pierre Bayle, (1647–1706)12
- Richard Bentley, (1662–1742)
- George Berkeley, (1685–1753)12
- François Bernier, (1620–1688)
- Hugh Binning, (1627–1653)
- Samuel Bold, (1649–1737)
- Robert Boyle, (1627–1691)12
- Peter Browne, (1666–1735)
- Thomas Browne, (1605–1682)
- Claude Buffier, (1661–1737)
- Richard Burthogge, (1638–1704)
- Joseph Butler, (1692–1752)12

== C ==
- Gershom Carmichael, (c. 1672–1729)
- Margaret Cavendish, (1623–1673)
- Walter Charleton, (1619–1707)
- William Chillingworth, (1602–1644)
- Samuel Clarke, (1675–1729)12
- Johannes Clauberg, (1622–1665)
- Catherine Trotter Cockburn, (1679–1749)
- Arthur Collier, (1680–1732)
- Anthony Collins, (1676–1729)12
- Lady Anne Finch Conway, (1631–1679)12
- Geraud de Cordemoy, (1626–1684)
- Jean-Pierre de Crousaz, (1663–1750)
- Ralph Cudworth, (1617–1688)12
- Nathaniel Culverwel, (1619–1651)
- Richard Cumberland, (c. 1631–1718)

== D ==
- John Theophilus Desaguliers, (1683–1744)
- Robert Desgabets, (1610–1678)
- Kenelm Digby, (1603–1665)
- Humphry Ditton, (1675–1715)
- René Descartes (1596-1650)

== E ==
- Elisabeth of Bohemia, (1618–1680)

== F ==
- Michelangelo Fardella, (1646–1718)
- François de Salignac de la Mothe-Fénelon, (1651–1715)
- Bernard le Bovier de Fontenelle, (1657–1757)
- Simon Foucher, (1644–1696)

== G ==
- Gadadhara Bhattacharya, (1604–1709)
- John Gay, (1685–1732)
- Arnold Geulincx, (1624–1669)12
- Joseph Glanvill, (1636–1680)
- Baltasar Gracián y Morales, (1601–1658)
- Guido Grandi, (1671–1742)

== H ==
- Han Wonjin, (1682–1751)
- James Harrington, (1611–1677)
- Franciscus Mercurius van Helmont, (1614–1698)
- Huang Zongxi (or Huang Tsung-hsi), (1610–1695)
- Pierre Daniel Huet, (1630–1721)
- Francis Hutcheson, (1694–1746)12
- Christiaan Huygens, (1629–1695)

== I ==
- Ito Jinsai, (1627–1705)
- Isaac Cardoso, (1603 or 1604).
- Isaac Orobio de Castro, (c.1617–1687)

== J ==
- Samuel Johnson, (1649–1703)

== K ==
- Kaibara Ekiken, (1630–1740)
- Lord Kames, (1696–1782)
- Kumazawa Banzan, (1619–1691)

== L ==
- Louis de La Forge, (1632–1666)
- William Law, (1686–1761)
- Jean Le Clerc, (1657–1737)
- Antoine Le Grand, (1629–1699)
- Gottfried Leibniz, (1646–1716)12*
- John Locke, (1632–1704)12

== M ==
- Nicolas Malebranche, (1638–1715)12
- Bernard de Mandeville, (1670–1733)2
- Damaris Cudworth Masham, (1659–1708)
- Baron de Montesquieu (1689–1755)2
- Henry More, (1614–1687)

== N ==
- Isaac Newton, (1642–1727)12
- John Norris, (1657–1711)*

== O ==
- Ogyū Sorai, (1666–1728)

== P ==
- Blaise Pascal, (1623–1662)2
- Robert Joseph Pothier, (1699–1772)
- Samuel Pufendorf, (1632–1694)2

== R ==
- John Ray, (1627–1705)
- Pierre-Sylvain Regis, (1632–1707)
- Hermann Samuel Reimarus, (1694–1768)
- Jacques Rohault, (1617–1672)

== S ==
- Anna Maria van Schurman, (1607–1678)
- John Sergeant, (1623–1704)
- Anthony Ashley-Cooper, 3rd Earl of Shaftesbury, (1671–1713)12
- Baruch Spinoza, (1632–1677)12
- James Dalrymple, 1st Viscount Stair, (1619–1695)
- Edward Stillingfleet, (1635–1699)
- Gabrielle Suchon, (1631–1703)
- Emanuel Swedenborg, (1688–1772)
- Algernon Sydney, (1623–1683)

== T ==
- Christian Thomasius, (1655–1728)
- Matthew Tindal, (1657–1733)
- John Toland, (1670–1722)12
- Ehrenfried Walther von Tschirnhaus, (1651–1708)
- George Turnball, (1698–1748)

== V ==
- Giambattista Vico, (1668–1744)12
- Voltaire, (1694–1778)12

== W ==
- Wang Fuzhi (or Wang Fu-Chih or Wang Chuanshan), (1619–1692)
- Benjamin Whichcote, (1609–1683)
- Gerrard Winstanley, (1609–1676)
- Christian Wolff, (1679–1754)12
- William Wollaston, (1659–1724)

== Y ==
- Yen Yuan (1635–1704)
- Yi Kan (1677–1727)

== See also ==
- List of philosophers
- 17th-century philosophy
- List of philosophers born in the centuries BC
- List of philosophers born in the 1st through 10th centuries
- List of philosophers born in the 11th through 14th centuries
- List of philosophers born in the 15th and 16th centuries
- List of philosophers born in the 18th century
- List of philosophers born in the 19th century
- List of philosophers born in the 20th century
