= List of philosophers born in the 15th and 16th centuries =

Philosophers born in the 15th and 16th centuries (and others important in the history of philosophy), listed alphabetically:

Note: This list has a minimal criterion for inclusion and the relevance to philosophy of some individuals on the list is disputed.

== A-B ==
- Isaac ben Judah Abravanel, (1437–1508)
- Judah ben Isaac Abravanel, (c. 1460–c. 1535)
- Alessandro Achillini, (1463–1512)
- Uriel Acosta, (1585–1640)
- Rodolphus Agricola, (1443–1485)
- Heinrich Cornelius Agrippa, (1436–1535)*
- Leone Battista Alberti, (1404–1472)
- Yohanan ben Isaac Alemanno, (1433–1504)
- Isaac ben Moses Arama, (1420–1494)
- Jacobus Arminius, (1560–1609)
- Francis Bacon, (1561–1626)12
- Domingo Báñez, (1528–1604)
- Sebastiano Basso, (16th century)
- Gabriel Biel, (1425–1495)
- Jean Bodin, (1530–1596)12
- Jakob Böhme, (1575–1624)
- Giovanni Botero, (c. 1544–1617)
- Giordano Bruno, (1548–1600)12*

== C-E ==
- Thomas Cajetan, (1469–1534)12
- John Calvin, (1509–1564)2
- Tommaso Campanella, (1568–1639)12
- Gerolamo Cardano, (1501–1576)
- Andrea Cesalpino, (1519–1603)
- Chaitanya Mahaprabhu, (1486–1534)
- Pierre Charron, (1541–1603)
- Ch'en Hsien-chang, (1428–1500)
- Chiao Hung, (1540–1620)
- John Comenius, (1592–1670)12
- Nicolaus Copernicus, (1473–1543)12
- Johannes Crellius, (1590–1633)
- Cesare Cremonini, (1550–1631)
- Jalal al-Din al-Dawani, (1426–1502)
- Elijah Delmedigo, (1460–1497)
- Joseph Solomon Delmedigo, (1484–1558)
- Denys the Carthusian (or Denys de Leeuwis), (1402–1471)
- René Descartes, (1596–1650)12
- Guillaume du Vair, (1556–1621)
- Desiderius Erasmus, (1466–1536)12

== F-K ==
- Marsilio Ficino, (1433–1499)12*
- Robert Filmer, (1588–1653)12
- Robert Fludd, (1574–1637)
- Pedro da Fonseca, (1528–1599)
- Fujiwara Seika, (1561–1619)
- Galileo Galilei, (1564–1642)12
- Pierre Gassendi, (1592–1655)12
- Rudolph Goclenius, (1547–1628)
- Wawrzyniec Grzymala Goslicki (1530–1607)
- Hugo Grotius, (1583–1645)12
- Henricus Regius, (1598–1679)
- Edward Herbert, 1st Baron Herbert of Cherbury, (1583–1648)
- Abraham Cohen de Herrera (or Alonso Nunez de Herrera or Abraham Irira), (1562–1635)
- Thomas Hobbes, (1588–1679)12
- Richard Hooker, (1554–1600)
- John of St. Thomas (or Jean Poinsot), (1589–1644)
- Joachim Jungius, (1587–1657)
- Bartholomäus Keckermann, (1571–1609)
- Johannes Kepler, (1571–1630)*

== L-O ==
- Isaac La Peyrère, (1596–1676)
- Justus Lipsius, (1547–1606)
- Liu Tsung-chou (or Ch'i-shan), (1578–1645)
- Martin Luther, (1483–1546)12
- Niccolò Machiavelli, (1469–1527)12
- John Major (or John Mair), (1467–1550)12
- Juan de Mariana, (1536–1624)
- Jacopo Mazzoni, (1548–1598)
- Bartolomé de Medina, (1527–1580)
- Philipp Melanchthon, (1497–1560)
- Marin Mersenne, (1588–1648)
- Judah Messer Leon, (c. 1425 – c. 1495)
- Mikyo Dorje (or Mi bskyod rdo rje), (1507–1554)
- Muhammad Baqir Mir Damad (or Sayyid al-Afadil or Ishraq or Ibn al-Damad), (died 1631)
- Luis de Molina, (1535–1600)12
- Michel de Montaigne, (1533–1592)12
- Thomas More, (1478–1535)*
- Mulla Sadra, (1571–1640)12
- Nicholas of Cusa, (1401–1464)12*
- Agostino Nifo, (1470–1538)
- Richard Overton, (c. 1599 – 1664)

== P-T ==
- Paracelsus, (1493–1541)
- Francesco Patrizi da Cherso (or Franciscus Patritius) (1529–1597)
- Giovanni Pico della Mirandola, (1463–1494)12*
- Pietro Pomponazzi, (1462–1525)12
- François Rabelais, (1493–1553)
- Petrus Ramus, (1515–1572)
- Raghunatha Siromani, (c. 1477–1547)
- Francisco Sanches, (1551–1623)
- Julius Caesar Scaliger, (1484–1558)
- Michal Sedziwój, (1566–1636)
- John Selden, (1584–1654)
- Francesco Silvestri (or Francis Sylvester of Ferrara), (1474–1528)
- Sosan Hyujong, (1520–1604)
- Domingo de Soto, (1494–1560)
- Francisco Suárez, (1548–1617)12*
- Nicolaus Taurellus, (1547–1606)
- Bernardino Telesio, (1509–1588)
- Teresa of Avila, (1515–1582)
- Francisco Toledo, (1532–1596)

== V-Z ==
- Lorenzo Valla, (1406–1457)12*
- Vallabhacharya, (1479–1531)
- Vyasatirtha, (c. 1460–1539)
- Lucilio "Giulio Cesare" Vanini, (1585–1619)
- Gabriel Vasquez, (1549–1604)
- Nicoletto Vernia, (1442–1499)
- Francisco de Vitoria, (1492–1546)12
- Juan Luís Vives, (1492–1540)
- Wang Yangming, (1472–1529)12
- Thomas White, (1593–1676)
- Yi Hwang (or Toegye) (1501–1570)
- Yi I (or Yi Yulgok or Yi Yi) (1536–1584)
- Jacopo Zabarella, (1533–1589)

== See also ==
- List of philosophers
- List of philosophers born in the centuries BC
- List of philosophers born in the 1st through 10th centuries
- List of philosophers born in the 11th through 14th centuries
- List of philosophers born in the 17th century
- List of philosophers born in the 18th century
- List of philosophers born in the 19th century
- List of philosophers born in the 20th century
