= List of philosophers born in the centuries BC =

Philosophers born in the centuries BC (and others important in the history of philosophy), listed alphabetically:

Note: This list has a minimal criterion for inclusion and the relevance to philosophy of some individuals on the list is disputed.

== A ==
- Aenesidemus, (1st century BC)^{[d]}
- Agastya,(c.1000 BCE)
- Alcibiades, (c. 450-404 BC)
- Alcmaeon of Croton, (5th century BC)^{[b]}^{[c]}^{[d]}^{[e]}
- Anacharsis, (6th century BC)
- Anaxagoras, (died 462 BC)^{[a]}^{[b]}^{[c]}^{[d]}^{[e]}*
- Anaxarchus, (fl. 340 BC)^{[d]}
- Anaxilaus, (1st century BC)
- Anaximander, (c. 610-c. 546 BC)^{[a]}^{[b]}^{[c]}^{[d]}
- Anaximenes of Miletus, (585-525 BC)^{[a]}^{[b]}^{[c]}^{[d]}
- Andronicus of Rhodes, (c. 70 BC)^{[a]}
- Angiras, (c. 11th century BC)
- Anniceris, (fl. 300 BC)^{[a]}
- Akspada Gautama,(8th century bc)
- Antiochus of Ascalon, (c. 130-68 BC)^{[a]}^{[b]}^{[c]}^{[d]}^{[e]}
- Antiphon, (480-403 BC)^{[d]}
- Antisthenes, (c. 444-365 BC)^{[b]}^{[c]}^{[d]}
- Arcesilaus, (316-241 BC)^{[a]}^{[b]}^{[c]}^{[d]}^{[e]}
- Archimedes, (d. 212 BC)
- Archytas, (428-347 BC)^{[a]}^{[d]}^{[e]}
- Aristippus the Elder of Cyrene, (c. 435-366 BC)^{[b]}^{[c]}^{[d]}
- Aristo of Chios, (fl. 250 BC)^{[d]}
- Aristotle, (384 BC-322 BC)^{[a]}^{[b]}^{[c]}^{[d]}^{[e]}
- Aristoxenus, (4th century BC)
- Asclepiades of Bithynia, (129-40 BC)
- Ajita Kesakambali (6th century BCE)
- Ashvapati, (c. 1000 BC)
- Ashtavakra, (c. 1000 BC)
- Titus Pomponius Atticus, (110-32 BC)

== B ==
- Bādarāyaņa, (c. 3rd century BC)
- Blossius, (2nd century BC)
- Gautama Buddha, (6th century BC)

== C ==
- Callicles, (late 5th century BC)^{[d]}^{[e]}
- Carneades, (c. 214-129 BC)^{[b]}^{[c]}^{[d]}^{[e]}
- Cārvāka, (c. 200-150 BC)
- Cebes of Thebes, (5th century BC)
- Chaerephon, (c. 460-c. 400 BC)
- Chanakya (or Kautilya) (321-296 BC)^{[d]}
- Chao Cuo (c. 200-154 BC)
- Chia Yi (or Jia Yi or Chia I), (201-169 BC)^{[a]}^{[d]}
- Chrysippus, (279-207 BC)^{[b]}^{[c]}^{[d]}
- Cicero, (106 BC-43 BC)^{[a]}^{[b]}^{[c]}^{[d]}
- Cleanthes, (301-232 BC)^{[d]}
- Cleobulus, (fl. 560 BC)
- Clitomachus, (187-109 BC)
- Confucius, (551 BC-479 BC)^{[a]}^{[b]}^{[c]}^{[d]}^{[e]}
- Crantor, (4th century BC)
- Crates of Thebes, (4th century BC)
- Cratylus of Athens, (c. 400 BC)^{[b]}^{[c]}^{[d]}

== D ==
- Democritus, (born 460 BC)^{[a]}^{[b]}^{[c]}^{[d]}^{[e]}
- Dirghatamas (14th century BCE)
- Deng Xi (501 BC)
- Diagoras, (5th century BC)
- Dandamis (4th Century BCE)
- Diodorus Cronus, (3rd century BC)^{[c]}^{[d]}^{[e]}
- Diogenes Apolloniates, (c. 460 BC)^{[d]}
- Diogenes the Cynic of Sinope, (412-323 BC)^{[b]}^{[c]}^{[d]}
- Dong Zhongshu (or Tung Chung-shu), (c. 176-c. 104 BC)^{[a]}^{[d]}

== E ==
- Ellopion of Peparethus, (4th century BC)
- Empedocles, (490 BC-430 BC)^{[a]}^{[b]}^{[c]}^{[d]}^{[e]}
- Epicharmus, (c. 540-450 BC)^{[d]}
- Epicurus, (341 BC-270 BC)^{[b]}^{[c]}^{[d]}^{[e]}
- Epimenides, (6th century BC)
- Eubulides of Miletus, (4th century BC)
- Euclid of Alexandria, (c. 323-283 BC)
- Euclid of Megara, (c. 400 BC)
- Eudoxus of Cnidus, (410 or 408 BC-355 or 347 BC)^{[a]}^{[d]}

== G ==
- Gaozi, (c. 420 BC)^{[a]}
- Gautama, Aksapada, (c. 2nd century BC)^{[d]}
- Gautama, Siddhartha (or Buddha), (ca. 563-483 BC)^{[a]}^{[c]}^{[d]}
- Gargi Vachaknavi (8th century BCE)
- Geminus, (c. 110-c. 40 BC)
- Gongsun Longzi, (c. 300 BC)^{[a]}
- Ghosha (8th century BCE)
- Gorgias, (c. 483-375 BC)^{[a]}^{[b]}^{[c]}^{[d]}
- Guan Zhong (or Kuan Tzu or Kwan Chung or Guanzi) (740-645 BC)^{[a]}^{[d]}
- Guiguzi

== H ==
- Han Fei, (d. 233 BC)
- Hecato of Rhodes, (135-50 BC)
- Hegesias of Cyrene, (c. 300 BC)
- Heraclides Ponticus, (387-312 BC)^{[d]}
- Heraclitus of Ephesus, (ca. 535-475 BC)^{[a]}^{[b]}^{[c]}^{[d]}
- Hicetas, (400-335 BC)
- Hipparchia of Maroneia, (4th century BC)
- Hippasus, (c. 500 BC)
- Hippias, (5th century BC)^{[d]}
- Hippocrates, (460-380 BC)^{[a]}^{[b]}^{[c]}
- Hsu Hsing, (c. 300 BC)^{[a]}
- Huai Nun Tzu (or Huainanzi or Liu An), (179-122 BC)^{[a]}^{[d]}
- Hui Shi, (4th century BC)^{[a]}

== I ==
- Isocrates, (436-338 BC)^{[a]}

== J ==
- Jaimini, (c. 3rd century BC)

== K ==
- Kapila, (c. 6th century BC)
- Kanada, (c. 2nd century BC)

== L ==
- Lopamudra (1950 BCE-1100 BCE)
- Lao Zi (or Lao Tzu), (4th century BC)^{[a]}^{[b]}^{[c]}^{[e]}
- Leucippus, (5th century BC)^{[a]}^{[b]}^{[c]}^{[d]}^{[e]}
- Li Kui (455 BC-395 BC)
- Li Si, (c. 280-208 BC)
- Liezi (or Lieh Tzu), (c. 440 BC-c. 360 BC)^{[a]}^{[c]}
- Lu Ban (507-440 BC)
- Lucretius, (c. 99-55 BC)^{[a]}^{[b]}^{[c]}^{[d]}^{[e]}

== M ==
- Mahavira, (599-527 BC)^{[a]}^{[d]}
- Makkhali Gosala, (6th century BC)
- Melissus of Samos, (late 5th century BC)^{[a]}^{[b]}^{[c]}^{[d]}
- Mencius (or Meng K'o or Meng-tzu or Mengzi), (372-289 BC)^{[a]}^{[b]}^{[c]}^{[d]}^{[e]}
- Markandeya, (c.1000BCE)
- Menedemus, (c. 350-278 BC)
- Maitreyi (8th century BCE)
- Metrocles, (c. 300 BC)
- Metrodorus of Lampsacus (the elder), (5th century BC)
- Metrodorus of Chios, (4th century BC)
- Metrodorus of Lampsacus (the younger), (331-278 BC)
- Metrodorus of Stratonicea, (late 2nd century BC)
- Mozi (or Mo Tzu, or Mo Ti, or Micius), (c. 470-c. 390 BC)^{[a]}^{[c]}^{[d]}

== N ==
- Nagasena (born 150 BC)

== O ==
- Ostanes, Iranian alchemist mage

== P ==
- Parshvanatha,(8th century BC)
- Panaetius, (c. 185-c. 110 BC)^{[d]}
- Pāṇini, (c. 600-500 BC)
- Parashara (c.1200 BCE)
- Parmenides, (5th century BC)^{[a]}^{[b]}^{[c]}^{[d]}
- Pañcaśikha (6th century BCE)
- Parshva, (c. 877-777 BC)
- Patañjali, (2nd century BC)^{[d]}
- Payasi (6th century BCE)
- Pippalada,(6th Century BC)
- Pherecydes of Syros, (6th century BC)
- Philo Judaeus of Alexandria, (20 BC-AD 40)^{[a]}^{[b]}^{[c]}^{[d]}
- Philo of Larissa, (1st century BC)^{[d]}^{[e]}*
- Philo the Dialectician, (c. 300 BC)^{[b]}^{[c]}^{[d]}
- Philodemus of Gadara, (1st century BC)^{[d]}^{[e]}*
- Philolaus of Croton, (c. 480-c. 405 BC)^{[a]}^{[d]}^{[e]}
- Pingala, (c. 4th century BC)
- Plato, (c. 427 BC-c. 347 BC)^{[a]}^{[b]}^{[c]}^{[d]}^{[e]}
- Polyaenus of Lampsacus, (died 278 BC)
- Posidonius, (c. 135-51 BC)^{[d]}
- Prodicus, (c. 450-399 BC)^{[d]}
- Protagoras, (c. 481-420 BC)^{[b]}^{[c]}^{[d]}
- Purana Kassapa (6th century BCE)
- Pakudha Kaccayana (6th century BCE)
- Pyrrho, (c. 360-c. 270 BC)^{[a]}^{[b]}^{[c]}^{[d]}^{[e]}
- Pythagoras, (c. 570 BC- c. 495 BC)^{[a]}^{[b]}^{[c]}^{[d]}^{[e]}

== S ==
- Sanjaya Belatthiputta (7th-6th century BCE)
- Śāriputra (6th century BCE)
- Seneca the Younger, (c. 4 BC-AD 65)^{[b]}^{[c]}^{[d]}
- Shang Yang (or Gongsun Yang), (d. 338 BC)^{[a]}
- Shvetaketu,(9th century BCE)
- Shen Buhai, (d. 337 BC)^{[a]}
- Shen Dao (or Shen Tzu), (c. 350-275 BC)^{[a]}
- Shvetashvatara, (c. 4th century BC)
- Socrates, (470 BC-399 BC)^{[a]}^{[b]}^{[c]}^{[d]}^{[e]}
- Solomon, (970-931 BC)
- Shukracharya (8th century BCE)
- Speusippus, (410-339 BC)^{[b]}^{[c]}^{[d]}^{[e]}
- Stilpo, (380-330 BC)
- Strato of Lampsacus, (c. 340-c. 268 BC)^{[a]}^{[d]}
- Sun Tzu, (4th century BC)
- Sung Hsing (or Sung Tzu), (360-290 BC)^{[a]}
- Su Qin (380-284 BC)

== T ==
- Thales, (c. 635 BC-543 BC)^{[a]}^{[b]}^{[c]}^{[d]}
- Theano, (c. 6th century BC)
- Theodorus of Cyrene, (c. 340-c. 250 BC)
- Theophrastus, (372-287 BC)^{[b]}^{[c]}^{[d]}
- Thrasymachus, (5th century BC)^{[a]}^{[c]}^{[d]}^{[e]}
- Thucydides, (c. 460-c. 400 BC)^{[d]}
- Timaeus of Locri, (5th century BC)
- Timon of Phlius, (c. 300 BC)^{[d]}^{[e]}
- Tiruvalluvar, (c. 1st century BC–2nd century CE)

== U ==
- Uddalaka Aruni (c. 1000 BC)

== V ==
- Vasishtha (12th century BCE)
- Vyasa

== X ==
- Xenocrates, (396-314 BC)^{[b]}^{[c]}^{[d]}^{[e]}
- Xenophanes of Colophon, (570-480 BC)^{[a]}^{[b]}^{[c]}^{[d]}^{[e]}
- Xenophon, (427-355 BC)^{[a]}^{[d]}
- Xun Zi (or Hsun Tzu), (c. 310-237 BC)^{[a]}^{[b]}^{[c]}^{[d]}^{[e]}*
- Xu Xing

== Y ==
- Yajnavalkya, (fl. c. 7th century BC)
- Yang Chu, (370-319 BC)^{[a]}^{[d]}
- Yang Xiong (or Yang Hsiung) (53 BC-AD 18)^{[a]}^{[d]}

== Z ==
- Zengzi (505 BC-436 BC)
- Zeno of Citium (333 BC-264 BC)^{[b]}^{[c]}^{[d]}
- Zeno of Elea (c. 495 BC-c. 430 BC)^{[b]}^{[c]}^{[d]}
- Zeno of Sidon (1st century BC)
- Zeno of Tarsus (3rd century BC)
- Zhang Yi (c. 329-309 BC)
- Zhuang Zi (or Chuang Tzu or Chuang Chou), (c. 300 BC)^{[a]}^{[b]}^{[c]}^{[e]}
- Zichan (522 BC)
- Zisi (c. 481-402 BC)
- Zoroaster
- Zou Yan (3rd century BC)^{[a]}

== See also ==
- Lists of philosophers
- List of philosophers born in the 1st through 10th centuries
- List of philosophers born in the 11th through 14th centuries
- List of philosophers born in the 15th and 16th centuries
- List of philosophers born in the 17th century
- List of philosophers born in the 18th century
- List of philosophers born in the 19th century
- List of philosophers born in the 20th century
