= List of philosophers born in the 11th through 14th centuries =

Philosophers born in the 11th through 14th centuries (and others important in the history of philosophy), listed alphabetically:

Note: This list has a minimal criterion for inclusion and the relevance to philosophy of some individuals on the list is disputed.

== A ==
- Abner of Burgos (1270–1348)^{[f]}
- Adam Parvipontanus (died 1181)
- Abraham ben Moses Maimonides (or Abraham ben Maimon; 1186–1237)^{[e]}
- Adelard of Bath (12th century)^{[a]}
- Atīśa (982–1054)
- Akka Mahadevi (c.1130–1160)
- Akshobhya Tirtha (c. 1282- c. 1365)
- Alain de Lille (c. 1128 – 1202)
- Al-Ghazali (1058–1111)^{[a]}^{[c]}^{[d]}^{[e]}
- Albert of Saxony (c. 1316 – 1390)^{[a]}^{[e]}^{[f]}
- Albertus Magnus (or Albert the Great or Albert of Cologne; c. 1193-1280)^{[a]}^{[c]}^{[d]}^{[e]}^{[f]}
- Alexander of Hales (died 1245)^{[a]}^{[e]}
- Amalananda (13th century)
- Al-Hilli (1250–1325)
- Abraham ibn Ezra (1092 or 1093–1167)^{[e]}^{[f]}
- Anselm (1034–1109)^{[a]}^{[c]}^{[d]}^{[e]}^{[f]}
- Abu al-Hakam al-Kirmani (12th century)
- Averroes (or Ibn Rushd; 1126–1198)^{[a]}^{[c]}^{[d]}^{[e]}^{[f]}
- Abraham bar Hiyya Ha-Nasi (1070–1136)^{[e]}
- Abul Maali al-Juwayni (1028–1085)^{[e]}

== B ==
- Bartolus de Saxoferrato (1313–1357)^{[e]}
- Bernard of Chartres (died 1130)^{[a]}
- Bahya ibn Paquda (1040–1110)^{[e]}
- Bhoja (1010–1055)
- Bernard of Clairvaux (1090–1153)^{[a]}^{[e]}
- Bernard Silvestris (or Bernard of Tours; 1147–1178)^{[e]}
- Basaveshwara (1134–1196)
- Basava (1130-1667)
- Basil Bessarion (1395–1472)^{[f]}
- Blasius of Parma (or Biagio Pelacani da Parma; 1345–1416)^{[e]}
- Boetius of Dacia (c. 1240 – c. 1280)^{[e]}
- Bonaventure (1221–1274)^{[a]}^{[c]}^{[d]}^{[e]}^{[f]}

== C ==
- Cavalcante de' Cavalcanti (died c. 1280)
- Chang Tsai (or Zhang Zai; 1020–1077)^{[e]}
- Chakradhar Swami (13th century)
- Cheng Hao (or Ch'eng Ming-Tao; 1032–1085)^{[a]}^{[e]}
- Cheng Yi (or Ch'eng Yi Chu'an; 1033–1107)^{[a]}^{[e]}
- Chou Tun-Yi (or Zhou Dunyi or Chou Lien-Hsi or Zhou Lianxi; 1017–1073)^{[a]}^{[e]}
- Christine de Pizan (c. 1365 – c. 1430)^{[e]}
- Clarembald of Arras (1110–1187)^{[e]}

== D ==
- David of Dinant (12th century)^{[e]}
- Dnyaneshwar (1275–1296)
- Dante Alighieri (1265–1321)^{[c]}^{[d]}^{[e]}^{[f]}
- Dominicus Gundissalinus (12th century)
- Dogen (also Dogen Zenji or Dōgen Kigen; 1200–1253)^{[c]}^{[d]}^{[e]}
- Duns Scotus (c. 1266 – 1308)^{[a]}^{[c]}^{[d]}^{[e]}^{[f]}
- Durandus of St. Pourçain (c. 1275 – 1334)^{[e]}

== F ==
- Francis of Assisi (1181–1226)
- Francis of Marchia (c. 1290 – c. 1344)^{[f]}
- Francis of Meyronnes (1285–1328)^{[e]}

== G ==
- Gangeśa (fl. c. 1325)^{[e]}
- Gennadius Scholarius (died c. 1473)
- George of Trebizond (1395–1484)^{[e]}
- Gangesha Upadhyaya (14th century)
- Gerard of Cremona (1114–1187)^{[e]}
- Gerard of Odo (or Gerald Odonis; 1290–1349)^{[e]}
- Gersonides (or Levi ben Gershon; 1288–1344)^{[a]}^{[e]}^{[f]}
- Gervase of Canterbury (1141 - 1210)
- Gilbert of Poitiers (1070–1154)^{[e]}
- Giles of Rome (c. 1243 – 1316)^{[a]}^{[c]}^{[d]}^{[e]}^{[f]}
- Godfrey of Fontaines (c. 1250 – 1309)^{[a]}^{[e]}^{[f]}
- Gregory of Palamas (1296 – 1359)
- Gregory of Rimini (died 1358)^{[a]}^{[c]}^{[d]}^{[e]}^{[f]}

== H ==
- Henry of Ghent (c. 1217 – 1293)^{[a]}^{[c]}^{[d]}^{[e]}^{[f]}
- Henry of Harclay (1270–1317)^{[e]}
- Hasdai Crescas (c. 1340 – 1410)^{[a]}^{[c]}^{[d]}^{[e]}^{[f]}
- Hibat Allah Abu'l-Barakat al-Baghd\aadi (1080–1165)^{[e]}
- Hemachandra (1088-1173)
- Herman of Carinthia (c. 1100 – c. 1160)
- Hervaeus Natalis (or Hervé Nedellec; 1250–1323)^{[e]}
- Hildegard of Bingen (1098–1179)^{[e]}
- Hillel ben Samuel of Verona (1220–1295)^{[e]}
- Hu Hung (or Wu-Feng; 1100–1155)^{[a]}
- Hugh of St Victor (c. 1078 – 1141)^{[e]}

== I ==
- Ibn Arabi (1165–1240)^{[e]}
- Ibn Bajjah (also Avempace; died 1138)^{[a]}^{[e]}
- Ibn Daud (also Rabad I or Avendauth or John of Spain; 1110–1180)^{[a]}^{[e]}^{[f]}
- Ibn Kammuna (1215–1284)^{[e]}
- Ibn Khaldun (1332–1406)^{[a]}^{[c]}^{[d]}^{[e]}
- Ibn Sabin (1217–1268)^{[e]}
- Ibn Taymiya (1263–1328)^{[e]}
- Ibn Tufail (1110–1185)^{[a]}^{[e]}
- Ibn Tzaddik (c. 1149)^{[e]}
- Immanuel the Roman (or Immanuel of Rome; c. 1270 – c. 1330)^{[e]}

== J ==
- James of Viterbo (1255–1308)^{[e]}
- Jinul (or Chinul; 1158–1210)^{[e]}
- Joseph Kaspi (12th century)^{[f]}
- Joachim of Fiore (1135–1201)^{[a]}^{[e]}
- Jayatirtha (c.1345 - c.1388)
- Jan Hus (1369–1415)^{[e]}
- Jean Gerson
- John of Jandun (1280–1328)^{[e]}
- John of La Rochelle (1190–1245)^{[e]}
- Johannes Capreolus (1380–1444)^{[e]}
- Jean Buridan (1300–1358)^{[a]}^{[c]}^{[d]}^{[e]}^{[f]}
- John of Mirecourt (c. 1345)^{[e]}
- John of Paris (1260–1306)^{[e]}
- Jean Gerson (1363–1429)^{[a]}^{[e]}
- John of Salisbury (c. 1115 – 1180)^{[a]}^{[e]}^{[f]}
- Judah ben Moses of Rome (or Judah Romano; 1292–1330)^{[e]}
- Judah Ben Samuel of Regensburg (c. 1200)

== K ==
- Khana (12th century)
- Kavindra Tirtha (c. 1333 - c.1398)
- Kabir (c. 1398–1518)

== L ==
- Lu Hsiang-shan (or Lu Xiangshan, also Lu Chiu-yuan or Tzu-ching or Ts'un-chai; 1139–1193)^{[a]}^{[e]}

== M ==
- Shri Madhvacharya (1238–1317)^{[a]}^{[c]}^{[d]}^{[e]}
- Moses Maimonides (also Rambam; 1135–1204)^{[a]}^{[c]}^{[d]}^{[e]}^{[f]}
- Marsilius of Inghen (1330–1396)^{[a]}^{[e]}^{[f]}
- Madhava Tirtha (died 1350)
- Manuel Chrysoloras (c. 1355 – 1415)
- Moses ibn Ezra (1070–1138)^{[e]}
- Mahapurna (12th century)
- Meister Eckhart (1260–1327 or 1328)^{[a]}^{[e]}^{[f]}
- Mamaidev (12th century)
- Marsilius of Padua (or Marsiglio or Marsilio dei Mainardine; 1270–1342)^{[a]}^{[c]}^{[d]}^{[e]}
- Matthew of Aquasparta (1238–1302)^{[e]}

== N ==
- Moses Nahmanides (1194–1270)^{[e]}
- Narayana Panditacharya (c. 1290 – c. 1370)
- Moses Narboni (c. 1300 – c. 1362)^{[f]}
- Narahari Tirtha (c. 1243 - c. 1333)
- Alexander Neckham (1157–1217)^{[e]}
- Naropa (12th century)
- Nichiren (1222–1282)^{[e]}
- Nicholas of Autrecourt (c. 1300 – 1369)^{[a]}^{[c]}^{[d]}^{[e]}^{[f]}

== O ==
- William of Ockham (c. 1285-1349)^{[a]}^{[b]}^{[c]}^{[d]}^{[e]}^{[f]}
- Peter Olivi (1248–1298)^{[a]}^{[e]}^{[f]}
- Nicole Oresme (1320–1382)^{[e]}^{[f]}
- Omar Khayyám (1048–1131)

== P ==
- Paul of Venice (1369–1429)^{[a]}^{[e]}^{[f]}
- John Peckham (died 1292)^{[e]}
- Peter Aureol (c. 1280 – 1322)^{[e]}^{[f]}
- Pierre d'Ailly (1350–1420)^{[a]}^{[e]}
- Profiat Duran (also Efodi or Isaac ben Moses Levi) (c. 1349 – c. 1414)^{[e]}
- Pietro d'Abano (c. 1250 – 1316)
- Pietro Damiani (c. 1007 – 1072)^{[e]}^{[f]}
- Peter Lombard (c. 1100 – 1160)^{[a]}^{[e]}
- William Penbygull (died 1420)^{[b]}^{[f]}
- Prabhācandra (11th century)
- Peter of Auvergne (13th century)^{[e]}
- Peter of Spain (usually identified with Pope John XXI; 13th century)^{[a]}^{[c]}^{[d]}^{[e]}^{[f]}
- Petrarch (1304–1374)^{[c]}^{[d]}^{[e]}
- Joane Petrizi (12th century)^{[f]}
- Pillai Lokacharya (1205–1311)
- Padmanabha Tirtha (died 1324)
- Philip the Chancellor (1160–1236)^{[e]}^{[f]}
- George Gemistos Plethon (c. 1355 – 1452)
- Isaac Polgar (early 14th century)^{[f]}
- Michael Psellus (11th century)
- Pseudo-Grosseteste (13th century)^{[e]}

== R ==
- Ramanuja (1017–1137)^{[a]}^{[c]}^{[d]}^{[e]}
- Fakhr al-Din al-Razi (1149–1209)^{[e]}
- Roger Bacon (1214–1294)^{[a]}^{[c]}^{[d]}^{[e]}^{[f]}
- Robert Alyngton (died 1398)^{[f]}
- Roger Marston (1235–1303)^{[e]}
- Richard Kilvington (or Richard Chillington; 1302–1361)
- Robert Kilwardby (1215–1279)^{[a]}^{[e]}^{[a]}^{[e]}^{[f]}
- Ramon Llull (1235–1315)^{[a]}^{[e]}
- Rgyal tshab dar ma rin chen (or Gyeltsap Darma Rinchen; 1364–1432)^{[e]}
- Richard of Middleton (c. 1249 – 1306)^{[e]}
- Ratnakīrti (11th century )
- Robert Holcot (1290–1349)^{[e]}^{[f]}
- Radulphus Brito (c. 1270 – c. 1320)^{[e]}
- Robert Grosseteste (or Robert of Lincoln or Robert Greathead; 1175–1253)^{[a]}^{[c]}^{[d]}^{[e]}^{[f]}
- Richard of St. Victor (died 1173)^{[e]}
- Richard Rufus (or Richard of Cornwall or Richardus Sophista; 1231–1259)^{[a]}^{[e]}^{[f]}
- Roscelin of Compiègne (c. 1050 – c. 1120)^{[a]}^{[e]}
- Jan van Ruysbroek (1293–1381)
- Richard Brinkley (fl. 1350–1373)^{[e]}

== S ==
- Sa skya pandita (also Sagya Pandita or Sagypandita; 1182–1251)^{[e]}
- Shao Yung (1011–1077)^{[a]}^{[e]}
- Johannes Sharpe (ca. 1360-after 1415)^{[f]}
- Shinran (1173–1261)^{[e]}
- Solomon Ibn Gabirol (1021–1058)^{[a]}^{[c]}^{[d]}^{[e]}^{[f]}
- Shem Tob Ibn Falaquera (1223–1290)^{[e]}^{[f]}
- Someshvara III (1127 – 1138 CE)
- Siddheshwar (12th century)
- Samuel Ibn Tibbon (c. 1165 – 1232)^{[f]}
- Simeon ben Zemah Duran (also Rashbaz) (1361–1444)^{[e]}
- Sigerus of Brabant (1240–1284)^{[a]}^{[e]}
- Simon of Faversham (c. 1260–1306)^{[f]}
- Shihab al-Din Yahya ibn Habash ibn Amirak al-Sohravardi (or al-Suhrawardi; 1154–1191)^{[c]}^{[d]}^{[e]}
- Henry Suso (1300–1366)^{[e]}

== T ==
- Johannes Tauler (c. 1300 – 1361)^{[e]}
- Theodore Metochita (died 1332)
- Theodoric of Freiberg ( c.1250 – c.1311)
- Thierry of Chartres (fl. c. 1130 – 1150)^{[e]}
- Thomas à Kempis (1380–1471)^{[e]}
- Thomas of Erfurt (14th century)^{[f]}
- Thomas Bradwardine (c. 1290 – 1349)^{[e]}
- Thomas Aquinas (1225–1274)^{[a]}^{[c]}^{[d]}^{[e]}^{[f]}
- Thomas of York (13th century)^{[e]}
- Trivikrama Panditacharya (c.1258 - c.1320)
- Je Tsongkhapa (or Dzongkaba or Rinpoche; 1357–1419)^{[e]}
- Nasir al-Din Tusi (1201–1274)^{[e]}

== U ==
- Ubertino of Casale (1259 – c. 1328)^{[b]}
- Udayana (11th century)^{[e]}
- Ulrich of Strasbourg (1220–1277)^{[b]}^{[e]}
- Urso of Calabria (died c. 1225)^{[b]}

== V ==
- Mādhava Vidyāranya, (c. 1268–1386)
- Vedanta Desika (1268–1369)
- Vincent of Beauvais (c. 1190 – c. 1264)^{[b]}
- Vincent Ferrer (1350–1419)^{[b]}
- Vital Du Four (1260–1327)^{[b]}^{[e]}
- Vishnu Tirtha (13th century)

== W ==
- Walter of Ailly (13th century)^{[b]}
- Walter of Bruges (c. 1225 – 1307)^{[b]}
- Walter Hilton (c. 1343 – 1396)^{[b]}
- Walter of Mortagne (c. 1100 – 1174)^{[b]}
- William of Alnwick (1270–1333)^{[b]}^{[a]}
- William of Arnaud^{[b]}
- William of Heytesbury (or Hentisberus or Hentisberi or Tisberi; 1313–1373)^{[a]}^{[b]}^{[e]}^{[f]}
- William Crathorn (14th century)^{[b]}^{[e]}^{[f]}
- William of Auvergne, Bishop of Paris (1180–1249)^{[a]}^{[b]}^{[e]}^{[f]}
- William of Auxerre (died 1231)^{[a]}^{[b]}^{[e]}
- William of Bonkes^{[b]}
- Walter Chatton (1290–1343)^{[b]}^{[e]}^{[f]}
- William Buser (1339 – c. 1413)^{[b]}
- William of Champeaux (c. 1070 – 1121)^{[b]}^{[e]}^{[f]}
- William of Clifford (died 1306)^{[b]}
- William of Conches (c. 1080 – 1154)^{[b]}^{[e]}
- William of Durham (died 1249)^{[b]}
- William of Falgar (died 1297/8)^{[b]}
- William Hothum (c. 1245 – 1298)^{[b]}
- William de la Mare (fl. 1270s)^{[b]}
- William of Lucca (died 1178)^{[b]}
- William of Macclesfield (died 1303)^{[b]}
- William of Middleton (died c. 1260)^{[b]}
- William Milverley (fl. c. 1400)^{[b]}
- William of Moerbeke (c. 1215 – 1286)^{[a]}^{[b]}
- William of Newburgh (1136 - 1198)
- William of Nottingham I (died 1254)
- William of Nottingham II (c. 1282 – 1336)^{[b]}
- William of Ockham (c. 1287 – 1347)^{[e]}
- William of Pagula (c. 1290 – c. 1332)^{[b]}
- William Perault (c. 1200 – 1261)^{[b]}
- William Peter Godin (c. 1260 – 1336)^{[b]}
- William of Rubio (born c. 1290)^{[b]}
- William of Saint-Amour (c. 1200 – 1272)^{[b]}
- William of St-Thierry (c. 1080 – c. 1148)^{[b]}
- William of Sherwood (also Shyreswood &c.; 1190–1249)^{[a]}^{[b]}^{[e]}
- William of Soissons (12th century)^{[b]}
- William of Ware (fl. 1290–1305)^{[b]}
- Witelo (c. 1230 – c. 1290)^{[b]}
- Adam de Wodeham (1298–1358)^{[a]}^{[b]}^{[e]}
- John Wyclif (c. 1330 – 1384)^{[a]}^{[c]}^{[d]}^{[e]}^{[f]}
- Walter Burley (c. 1275 – c. 1345)^{[a]}^{[b]}^{[e]}^{[f]}

== Y ==
- Yadava Prakaasa (12th century)
- Yehuda Halevi (c. 1085 – 1141)^{[a]}^{[c]}^{[d]}^{[e]}^{[f]}

== Z ==
- Zeami Motokiyo (c. 1363 – c. 1443)^{[e]}
- Zhu Xi (or Chu Hsi) (1130–1200)^{[a]}^{[c]}^{[d]}^{[e]}

== See also ==
- List of philosophers
- List of philosophers born in the centuries BC
- List of philosophers born in the 1st through 10th centuries
- List of philosophers born in the 15th and 16th centuries
- List of philosophers born in the 17th century
- List of philosophers born in the 18th century
- List of philosophers born in the 19th century
- List of philosophers born in the 20th century
