= List of philosophers born in the 1st through 10th centuries =

Philosophers born in the 1st to 10th centuries (and others important in the history of philosophy), listed alphabetically:

Note: This list has a minimal criterion for inclusion and the relevance to philosophy of some individuals on the list is disputed.

== A ==
- Abbo of Fleury, (c. 950 – 1004)^{[b]}
- Abd al-Jabbar ibn Ahmad, (c. 935 – 1025)^{[b]}
- Abd al-Salam al-Jubba'i, (died 933)^{[b]}
- Abhinavagupta, (fl. c. 975 – 1025)^{[e]}
- Abū Ḥanīfa, (c. 699 – 767)^{[b]}
- Abu al-Hudhayl, (c. 750 – 840/850)^{[b]}
- Abu Ma'shar al-Balkhi, (787 – 886)^{[b]}
- Abu Said Al-Sirafi, (died 979)^{[b]}
- Abu Tammam, (859 – 937/947)^{[b]}
- Abu Zayd al-Balkhi, (c. 850 – 934)^{[b]}
- Adi Shankara, (c. 788 – 820)^{[b]}
- Aedesius, (died 355)
- Agrippa the Sceptic, (1st/2nd century)^{[e]}
- Albinus, (c. 130)
- Alcinous, (2nd century)^{[e]}
- Alcuin, (c. 740 – 804)^{[b]}
- Alexander of Aphrodisias, (2nd century)^{[a]}^{[e]}^{[f]}
- Alhazen (or Ibn al-Haytham), (965 – c. 1040)^{[b]}
- Ali ibn Abbas al-Majusi, (died c. 982)^{[b]}
- Abū al-ʿAlāʾ al-Maʿarrī (December 973 – May 1057 CE)
- Ambrose, (c. 340 – 397)^{[a]}
- Abu'l Hasan Muhammad Ibn Yusuf al-'Amiri, (died 992)^{[e]}^{[b]}
- Ammonius Hermiae, (5th century)^{[e]}^{[f]}
- Ammonius Saccas, (3rd century)^{[a]}
- Anandavardhana, (820 – 890)
- Apollonius of Tyana, (2 – 98)
- Apuleius, (c. 123 – c. 180)^{[e]}
- Aristides, (fl. 2nd century)
- Arius, (256 – 336)
- Al-Ash'ari, (874 – 936)^{[b]}
- Asanga, (c. 4th century)
- Aspasius, (c. 100 – 150)
- Athanasius of Alexandria, (298 – 373)^{[a]}
- Augustine of Hippo, (354 – 430)^{[a]}^{[c]}^{[d]}^{[e]}^{[f]}
- Marcus Aurelius, (121 – 180)^{[a]}^{[c]}^{[d]}^{[e]}
- Avicenna (or Ibn Sina), (980 – 1037)^{[a]}^{[b]}^{[c]}^{[d]}^{[e]}

== B ==
- Al-Baqillani (died 1013)^{[b]}
- Basilides, (c. 117 – 138)^{[a]}
- Bede (672/3–735)^{[b]}
- Bhartrhari, (5th century)^{[e]}
- Bodhidharma, (c. 440 – 528)
- Anicius Manlius Severinus Boethius, (480 – 524 or 525)^{[a]}^{[c]}^{[d]}^{[e]}^{[f]}
- Buddhaghosa, (5th century)^{[a]}
- Burchard of Worms (c. 950 – 1025)^{[b]}

== C ==
- Calcidius, (4th century)^{[e]}
- Candidus Wizo, (fl. 793 – 803)^{[b]}
- Candrakirti, (born c. 600)
- Celsus of Alexandria, (2nd century)^{[a]}^{[e]}
- Candrakirti, (7th century)
- Cheng Hsuan (or Zheng Xuan), (127 – 200)^{[e]}
- Chih Tun (or Zhi Dun), (314 – 366)^{[e]}
- Chrysanthius, (4th century)
- Clement of Alexandria, (2nd – 3rd century)^{[a]}^{[e]}
- Cleomedes, (2nd century)^{[e]}
- Cyril of Alexandria, (376 – 444)

== D ==
- Damascius, (c. 462 – 540)^{[a]}^{[e]}
- David the Invincible, (late 6th century)^{[f]}
- David ibn Merwan al-Mukkamas, (9th century)^{[b]}
- Dawud ibn Khalaf, (815/8 – 874)^{[b]}
- Demetrius the Cynic, (1st century)
- Dharmakirti, (c. 7th century)^{[a]}^{[e]}
- Dignaga, (c. 480 – c. 540)^{[e]}
- Diogenes Laërtius, (3rd century)^{[c]}^{[d]}^{[e]}
- Diogenes of Oenoanda, (2nd century)^{[e]}
- Dirar ibn 'Amr, (c. 728 – 815)^{[b]}
- Dunash ibn Tamim, (10th century)^{[b]}

== E ==
- Elias, (6th century)^{[f]}
- Epictetus, (55 – c. 135)^{[c]}^{[d]}^{[e]}^{[f]}*
- Johannes Scotus Eriugena, (c. 800 – c. 880)^{[a]}^{[b]}^{[c]}^{[d]}^{[e]}^{[f]}
- Eusebius of Caesarea, (264–339)^{[e]}

== F ==
- Al-Farabi, (870 – 950)^{[a]}^{[b]}^{[c]}^{[d]}^{[e]}
- Favorinus, (c. 80 – c. 150)
- Fazang (or Fa-Tsang), (643 – 712)^{[e]}
- Fridugisus, (9th century)^{[b]}
- Fulbert of Chartres, (c. 960 – 1028)^{[b]}

== G ==
- Gaius Musonius Rufus, (110 – 180)^{[e]}
- Galen, (131 – 201)^{[a]}^{[c]}^{[d]}^{[e]}
- Gaudapadacharya, (c. 7th century)
- Gerbert of Aurillac (or Pope Silvester II), (c. 950 – 1003)^{[e]}
- Gottschalk of Orbais, (c. 805 – 868)^{[b]}
- Pope Gregory I, (540 – 604)^{[a]}^{[c]}^{[d]}
- Gregory of Nyssa, (c. 335 – 398)^{[a]}

== H ==
- Han Yu, (768 – 824)^{[a]}^{[e]}
- Heiric of Auxerre, (841 – 876/7)^{[b]}
- Hierocles the Stoic, (2nd century)^{[e]}
- Himerius, (315 – 386)
- Hincmar, (806 – 882)^{[b]}
- Ho Yen, (190 – 249)^{[a]}
- Hsi K'ang, (223 – 262)^{[a]}
- Hunayn ibn Ishaq, (808 – 877)^{[b]}
- Hypatia of Alexandria, (370 – 415)^{[a]}^{[e]}

== I ==
- Iamblichus, (c. 245 – c. 325)^{[e]}
- Yahya ibn Adi, (893 – 974)^{[e]}
- Ibn ar-Rawandi, (c. 910)^{[e]}
- Ibn Furak, (c. 941 – 1015)^{[b]}
- Ahmad ibn Hanbal, (780–855)^{[b]}
- Ibn Hazm, (994 – 1069)^{[b]}^{[e]}
- Ibn al-Khammar, (942 – c. 1030)^{[b]}
- Ibn Masarra, (883 – 931)^{[b]}^{[e]}
- Ibn Miskawayh, (940 – 1030)^{[a]}^{[b]}^{[e]}
- Abd-Allāh Ibn al-Muqaffaʿ, (c. 720 – c. 756)^{[b]}
- Ibn al-Rawandi, (died c. 910)^{[b]}
- Ibn al-Tayyib, (died 1043)^{[b]}
- Ikhwan al-Safa', (10th century)^{[b]}
- 'Isa ibn Zur'a, (943 – 1008)^{[b]}
- Isaac Ben Solomon Israeli, (c. 850 – 950)^{[b]}^{[e]}^{[f]}*
- Isidore of Seville, (c. 560 – 636)^{[b]}
- Isvarakrsna, (5th century)

== J ==
- Jesus of Nazareth, (4 BC – AD 30)
- Jābir ibn Hayyān, (died c. 806–816)
- Jahm bin Safwan, (died 746)^{[b]}
- Jayanta Bhatta, (c. 9th century)
- John of Damascus, (c. 676 – 749)^{[a]}^{[e]}
- Juan Chi, (210 – 263)^{[a]}
- Justinian I, (483 – 565)^{[e]}

== K ==
- Abd al-Masih ibn Ishaq al-Kindi, (9th/10th century)^{[b]}
- Al-Kindi, (801 – 873)^{[a]}^{[b]}^{[c]}^{[d]}^{[e]}^{[f]}*
- Hamid al-Din al-Kirmani, (died c. 1021)^{[b]}
- Ko Hung, (4th century)^{[a]}
- Kūkai, (774 – 835)^{[c]}^{[d]}^{[e]}
- Kumārila Bhaṭṭa, (c. 7th century)
- Kundakunda, (c. 2nd century)
- Kuo Hsiang (or Guoxiang), (c. 312)^{[a]}

== L ==
- Li Ao, (722 – 841)^{[a]}
- Linji Yixuan (or Lin Chi), (c. 810 – 867)^{[e]}
- Longinus, (1st century)^{[a]}
- Cassius Dionysius Longinus, (213 – 273)
- Lucian, (c. 120 – c. 180)^{[e]}
- Lucius Annaeus Cornutus, (1st century)

== M ==
- Macrobius Ambrosius Theodosius, (fl. c. 430)
- Gaius Marius Victorinus, (4th century)^{[e]}
- Abu Mansur Maturidi (before 973 – c. 944)^{[b]}
- Al-Mawardi, (974 – 1058)^{[b]}
- Mazdak, (died c. 526)
- Miskawayh, (c. 932 – 1030)^{[b]}
- David Ibn Merwan Al-Mukammas (or Daud Ibn Marwan al-Muqammas or David ha-Bavli), (died 937)^{[e]}

== N ==
- Nagarjuna, (c. 200)^{[a]}^{[c]}^{[d]}^{[e]}
- Muhammad al-Nasafi (died 943)^{[b]}
- Ibrahim an-Nazzam (died 835/45)^{[b]}
- Nemesius of Emesa, (fl. c. 400)^{[a]}^{[e]}
- Numenius of Apamea, (2nd century)^{[a]}^{[e]}

== O ==
- Olympiodorus the Younger, (495 – 570)^{[f]}*
- Origen of Alexandria, (c. 182 – c. 251)^{[a]}^{[e]}

== P ==
- Pelagius, (c. 360 – c. 435)^{[c]}^{[d]}
- Peter the Iberian, (411 – 491)
- Peter of Pisa, (744 – 799)^{[b]}
- Joannes Philoponus, (early 6th century)^{[a]}^{[c]}^{[d]}^{[e]}^{[f]}
- Philostratus, (2nd – 3rd centuries)
- Photios I of Constantinople, (c. 810 – c. 893)^{[b]}78
- Plotinus, (died 270)^{[a]}^{[c]}^{[d]}^{[e]}^{[f]}
- Mestrius Plutarch of Chaeronia, (c. 45 – c. 120)^{[e]}
- Porphyry, (c. 232 – c. 304)^{[a]}^{[c]}^{[d]}^{[e]}^{[f]}
- Prabhākara, (c. 7th century)
- Proclus, (412 – 487)^{[c]}^{[d]}^{[e]}
- Prudentius of Troyes, (died 861)^{[b]}
- Pseudo-Dionysius the Areopagite, (5th century)^{[e]}^{[f]}
- Ptolemy, (c. 85 – c. 165)^{[e]}

== Q ==
- Abd al-Karīm ibn Hawāzin Qushayri, (986 – 1072)^{[b]}
- Qusta ibn Luqa, (died 912)^{[b]}

== R ==
- Rabanus Maurus (or Hrabanus Maurus), (c. 783 – 856)^{[b]}
- Ratramnus, (died c. 868)^{[b]}
- Abu Bakr Muhammad ibn Zakariya al-Razi (or Rhazes), (865–925)^{[a]}^{[b]}^{[e]}
- Abu Hatim al-Razi, (died c. 934)^{[b]}
- Remigius of Auxerre, (c. 841 – 908)^{[b]}

== S ==
- Saadia Gaon, (892 – 942)^{[a]}^{[b]}^{[c]}^{[d]}^{[e]}^{[f]}
- Ahmad ibn al-Tayyib al-Sarakhsi, (c. 835 – 899)^{[b]}
- Sedulius Scottus, (fl. 840s – 860s)^{[b]}
- Sengzhao, (384 – 414)^{[e]}
- Sextus Empiricus, (2nd/3rd century)^{[a]}^{[c]}^{[d]}^{[e]}
- Muhammad ibn Idris ash-Shafi`i, (767 – 819)^{[b]}
- Sibawayh, (c. 760 – c. 796)^{[b]}
- Siddhasena Divākara, (5th century)
- Abu Sulayman Muhammad al-Sijistani, (c. 932 – c. 1000)^{[b]}^{[e]}
- Abu Yaqub al-Sijistani, (10th century)^{[b]}
- Simplicius of Cilicia, (early 6th century)^{[a]}^{[e]}^{[f]}*
- Syrianus, (5th century)^{[f]}*

== T ==
- Abu Hayyan al-Tawhidi, (c. 930 – 1023)^{[b]}^{[e]}
- Tertullian, (c. 160 – c. 220)^{[a]}^{[e]}
- Thābit ibn Qurra, (c. 830 – 901)^{[b]}
- Themistius, (317 – 387)^{[e]}
- Theodore Abu-Qurrah, (c. 750 – c. 816)^{[b]}

== U ==
- Udayana, (c. 10th century)
- Uddyotakara, (6th century)^{[e]}
- Uisang, (625 – 702)^{[e]}
- Umāsvāti or Umasvami, (c. 2nd century)

== V ==
- Vācaspati Miśra (c. 9th century)
- Valentinius (or Valentinus), (c. 100 – c. 153)^{[a]}
- Valluvar (undated; probably c. 300 BCE to 400 CE)
- Vasubandhu, (4th century)^{[a]}^{[e]}
- Vasugupta, (860 – 925)
- Vatsyayana, (5th century)^{[e]}

== W ==
- Walafrid Strabo, (c. 808 – 849)^{[b]}
- Wang Bi, (226 – 249)^{[a]}
- Wang Ch'ung, (27–97)^{[a]}^{[e]}
- Wasil ibn Ata, (700 – 748)^{[b]}
- Wonchuk, (613 – 696)^{[e]}
- Wonhyo Daisa, (617 – 686)^{[e]}

== Y ==
- Yahya ibn 'Adi, (893 – 974)^{[b]}

== Z ==
- Zhiyi, (538 – 597)^{[e]}
- Zongmi, (780 – 841)^{[e]}

== See also ==
- List of philosophers
- List of philosophers born in the centuries BC
- List of philosophers born in the 11th through 14th centuries
- List of philosophers born in the 15th and 16th centuries
- List of philosophers born in the 17th century
- List of philosophers born in the 18th century
- List of philosophers born in the 19th century
- List of philosophers born in the 20th century
