= Michael Karinski =

Russian philosopher

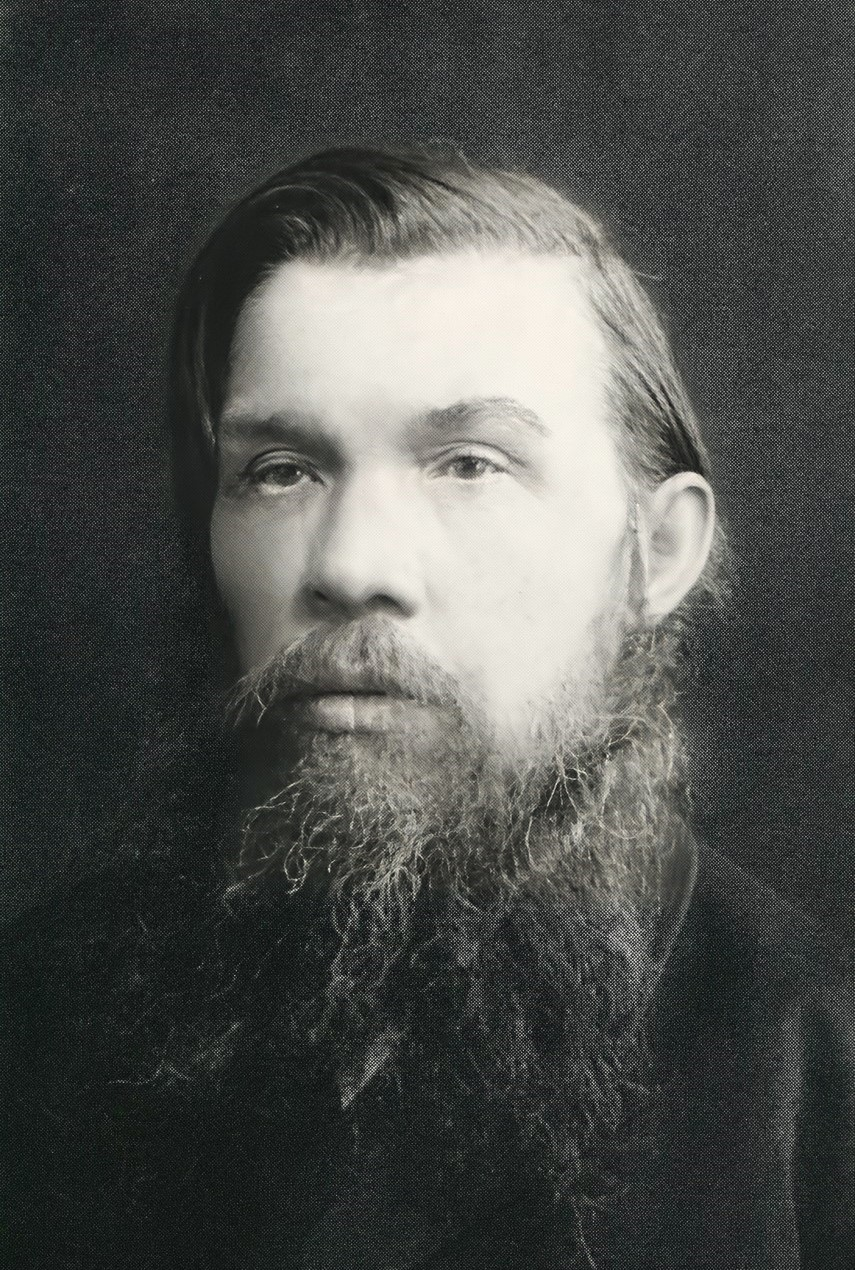
Michael Ivanovich Karinski

Michael Ivanovich Karinski (Russian: Михаил Иванович Каринский; 1840–1917) was a Russian philosopher. His Classification of Inferences (1880) has been called "the most important single work in logical theory that nineteenth-century Russia produced."

== Works ==
- Classification of Inferences, 1880
