= Georg Mehlis =

Georg Mehlis (8 March 1878 in Hanover – 13 November 1942 Freiburg im Breisgau) was a German neo-Kantian philosopher. Initially he was a philosopher of history in the style of Heinrich Rickert.

He edited (with Richard Kroner) Logos, Internationale Zeitschrift für Philosophie der Kultur, from 1910 (Logos was the title from 1912), with contributions by many leading German intellectual figures; which had an Italian stable-mate from 1914.

He turned in the 1920s to an interest in mysticism; and then wrote books on fascism. His ideas on aesthetics have been taken up by Suzanne Langer.

== Works ==
- Die Geschichtsphilosophie Auguste Comtes (1909)
- Einführing in ein Systeme der Religionsphilosophie (1917)
- Probleme der Ethik (1918)
- Über Formen der modernen Lyrik und Epik (Axel Lübbe). Eine kunstphilosophische Studie (1922)
- Die deutsche Romantik (1922)
- Plotin (1924)
- Die Mystik in der Fülle ihrer Erscheinungsformen in allen Zeiten und Kulturen (1927)
- Die Idee Mussolinis und der Sinn des Faschismus (1928)
- Der Staat Mussolinis (1929)
- Philosophie der Gegenwart (1932)
- Freiheit und Faschismus (1934)
