= Pantaleo Carabellese =

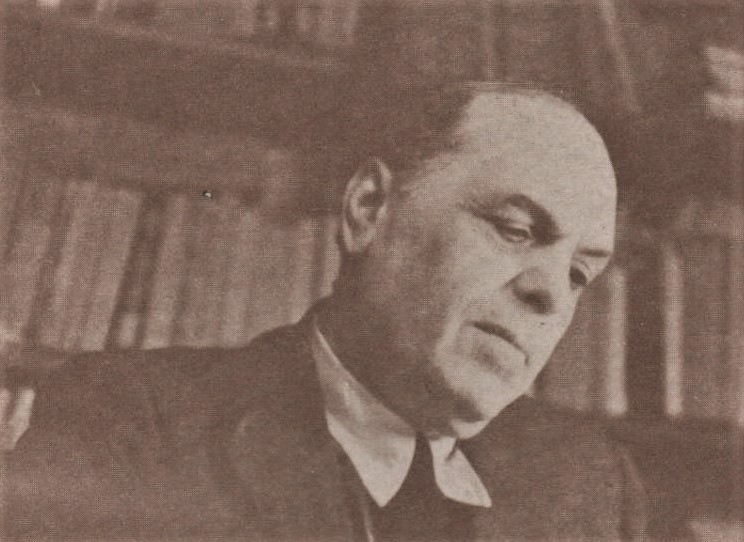
Pantaleo Carabellese

Pantaleo Carabellese (July 6, 1877 in Molfetta – September 19, 1948 in Genoa) was an Italian philosopher.

== Biography ==
Graduated from the University of Naples with a "laurea" in history (1901) and again from the University of Rome in philosophy (1906), Carabellese taught philosophy in Palermo, Sicily (1922–1929) and in Rome (1929–1948), marrying in 1936. Having carried out a rigorous critique of Cartesianism (Le obbiezioni al cartesianesimo, 3 vols, 1946; Il circolo vizioso in Cartesio, 1938), Carabellese completed critical studies of authors including Immanuel Kant and Antonio Rosmini (on whose work Carabellese wrote his university thesis). Carabellese is further known for his "critical ontology" (distinguished from Rosmini's homonym), where Being (l'Essere) is not the mere abstract object but the inherent and irreducible foundation of consciousness, and thus the "being of consciousness" that, ultimately, is none other than God, who, properly speaking, "is" but does not "exist".

As a philosopher, Carabellese defended (1) the essential objectivity of Being and (2) philosophy understood, not as a specialized, compartmentalized field of inquiry, but as investigation of the foundations of practical life (the life of consciousness), operating "for humanity as a whole" so that "philosophical consciousness explicates that theory which results necessarily implicit in the concrete diversifying of spirituality"; accordingly, "the effort of philosophy can never be completed act," even though "theory actuates itself always in one practice, which is the other term of the concrete" (Il Problema della Filosofia da Kant a Fichte, p. 7).

In critical opposition to modernism, Carabellese set out to defend philosophy as theoretical-rational ascent to theological realities, or as pathway to one common foundation of political life that remains irreducible to political life.

== Works ==
- Critica del concreto (1921)
- Il problema della filosofia da Kant a Fichte (1781–1801) (1929)
- Il problema teologico come filosofia (1931)
- Le obbiezioni al cartesianesimo (1946)
- L'idealismo italiano (1938)
- Il circolo vizioso in Cartesio (1938)
- L'idea politica d'Italia (1946)
- Da Cartesio a Rosmini. Fondazione storica dell’ontologismo critico (1946)
- L’essere e la sua manifestazione parte II (1998) [course lectures from 1947-1948]
- L’essere e la sua manifestazione: Dialettica della Forme (2005) [course lectures from 1947-1948]
- L’essere (1948)

== Secondary Literature ==
- Pagliarani Romeo, Pantaleo Carabellese: filosofo della coscienza concreta, Ravenna, Edizioni del Girasole, 1979.
- Semerari Giuseppe, La sabbia e la roccia: l'ontologia critica di Pantaleo Carabellese, Bari, Dedalo, 1982.
- Valori Furia, Il problema dell'io in Pantaleo Carabellese, Napoli, ESI, 1996.
- Morabito Bruno, Metafisica e teologia in Pantaleo Carabellese, Reggio Calabria, Falzea, 2001.
- Bini Andrea, Kant e Carabellese, Roma, Luiss University Press, 2006.
