= List of German-language philosophers =

This is a list of German-language philosophers. The following individuals have written philosophical texts in the German language. Many are categorized as German philosophers or Austrian philosophers, but some are neither German nor Austrian by ethnicity or nationality. Each one, however, satisfies at least one of the following criteria:

1. s/he has been identified as a philosopher in any reputable, reliable encyclopedic/scholarly publication (e.g. MacMillan, Stanford, Routledge, Oxford, Metzler.)
2. s/he has written multiple articles published in reputable, reliable journals of philosophy and/or written books that were reviewed in such journals.

Reference works such as the following discuss the lives and summarize the works of notable philosophers:

- (Cambridge) The Cambridge Dictionary of Philosophy, (Second Edition). Cambridge University Press; 1999. ISBN 0-521-63722-8
- (Macmillan) Macmillan's Encyclopedia of Philosophy, 1st edition (Paul Edwards, chief editor), 1973.
  - (Macmillan2) 2nd edition (Donald M. Borchert, chief editor), 2006, ISBN 0-02-865780-2
- (Metzler) Metzler Philosophen Lexikon: von den Vorsokratikern bis zu den Neuen Philosophen, 3rd ed., Bernd Lutz (Stuttgart: Metzler, 2003). ISBN 3-476-01953-5
- (Oxford 1995) The Oxford Companion to Philosophy. Oxford University Press, 1995, ISBN 0-19-866132-0.
  - (Oxford 2005) 2005, ISBN 0-19-926479-1
- (Routledge 1998) Routledge Encyclopedia of Philosophy. Routledge, 1998, ISBN 0-415-16917-8.
  - (Routledge 2000) Concise Routledge Encyclopedia of Philosophy. Routledge, 2000, ISBN 0-415-22364-4
- (Stanford) Peer-reviewed online Stanford Encyclopedia of Philosophy.
  - (Sassen) Brigitte Sassen. "18th Century German Philosophy Prior to Kant" in Stanford Encyclopedia of Philosophy

== A ==
Thomas Abbt (1738–1766) (Macmillan)
Theodor Adorno (1903–1969) (Cambridge; Macmillan2; Oxford 1995; Routledge 2000)
Magdalena Aebi (1898–1980)
Günther Anders (1902–1992)
Karl-Otto Apel (1922–2017) (Macmillan2)
Hannah Arendt (1906–1975) (Macmillan2)
Richard Avenarius (1843–1896) (Cambridge; Macmillan2; Oxford 1995; Routledge 2000)

== B ==
Franz Xaver von Baader (1765–1841) (Macmillan2)
Johann Jakob Bachofen (1815–1887) (Macmillan2)
Johann Bernhard Basedow (1723–1790) (Macmillan2)
Bruno Bauer (1809–1882) (Oxford 1995)
Lewis White Beck (1913-1997) (Macmillan2)
Jakob Sigismund Beck (1761–1840) (Macmillan2)
Friedrich Eduard Beneke (1798–1854) (Cambridge; Macmillan2)
Walter Benjamin (1892–1940) (Macmillan2; Oxford 1995; Routledge 2000)
Ernst Bloch (1885–1977) (Cambridge; Macmillan2; Routledge 2000)
Hans Blumenberg (1920–1996) (Metzler)
Ludwig Boltzmann (1844–1906) (Oxford 1995)
Bernhard Bolzano (1781–1848) (Cambridge; Macmillan2; Oxford 1995; Routledge 2000)
Franz Brentano (1838–1907) (Cambridge; Macmillan2; Oxford 1995; Routledge 2000)
Martin Buber (1878–1965) (Cambridge; Oxford 1995; Routledge 2000; Stanford)
Ludwig Büchner (1824–1899) (Macmillan; Routledge 2000)

== C ==
Rudolf Carnap (1891–1970) (Cambridge; Macmillan2; Oxford 1995; Routledge 2000)
Ernst Cassirer (1874–1945) (Cambridge; Macmillan2; Oxford 1995)
Julie Clodius (1750–1805)
Hermann Cohen (1842–1918) (Cambridge; Macmillan2; Oxford 1995)
Christian August Crusius (1715–1775) (Cambridge; Macmillan2; Routledge 2000)
Heinrich Czolbe (1819–1873) (Cambridge)

== D ==
Max Dessoir (1867–1947) (Macmillan)
Wilhelm Dilthey (1833–1911) (Cambridge; Macmillan2; Oxford 1995)
Eugen Dühring (1833–1921) (Routledge 2000)

== E ==
Johann Augustus Eberhard (1739–1809) (Macmillan2; Routledge 2000)
Albert Einstein (1879–1955) (Macmillan)
Friedrich Engels (1820–1895) (Oxford 1995)

== F ==
Gustav Fechner (1801–1887) (Cambridge)
Ludwig Andreas Feuerbach (1804–1872) (Cambridge; Macmillan2; Oxford 1995)
Johann Gottlieb Fichte (1762–1814) (Cambridge; Macmillan2; Oxford 1995)
Gottlob Frege (1848–1925) (Cambridge; Macmillan2; Oxford 1995; Routledge 2000)
Jakob Friedrich Fries (1773–1843) (Macmillan2; Routledge 2000)

== G ==
Hans-Georg Gadamer (1900–2002) (Cambridge; Macmillan2; Oxford 1995; Routledge 2000)
Arnold Gehlen (1904–1976) (Metzler)
Kurt Gödel (1906–1978) (Oxford 1995)
Johann Wolfgang von Goethe (1749–1832)
Johann Christoph Gottsched (1700–1766) (Macmillan2; Sassen)

== H ==
Jürgen Habermas (1929–2026) (Cambridge; Macmillan2; Routledge 2000)
Ernst Haeckel (1834–1919) (Macmillan2)
Johann Georg Hamann (1730–1788) (Cambridge)
Karl Robert Eduard von Hartmann (1842–1906) (Cambridge; Macmillan; Oxford 1995)
Nicolai Hartmann (1882–1950) (Cambridge; Macmillan2; Oxford 1995)
Georg Wilhelm Friedrich Hegel (1770–1831) (Macmillan2; Oxford 1995)
Martin Heidegger (1889–1976) (Cambridge; Macmillan; Oxford 1995)
Carl Gustav Hempel (1905–1997) (Cambridge; Macmillan2)
Johann Friedrich Herbart (1776–1841) (Cambridge; Macmillan2; Routledge 2000)
Johann Gottfried von Herder (1744–1803) (Cambridge; Macmillan2; Oxford 1995)
Heinrich Rudolf Hertz (1857–1894) (Macmillan2)
Moses Hess (1812–1875) (Routledge 2000)
David Hilbert (1862–1943) (Cambridge)
Richard Hönigswald (Macmillan2)
Hans Heinz Holz (1927–2011) (Metzler)
Max Horkheimer (1895–1973) (Cambridge; Macmillan2)
Wilhelm von Humboldt (1767–1835) (Oxford 1995)
Edmund Husserl (1859–1938) (Cambridge; Macmillan2; Oxford 1995; Routledge 1998; Routledge 2000)

== I ==
Roman Ingarden (1893–1970) (Routledge 1998)

== J ==
Friedrich Heinrich Jacobi (1743–1819) (Macmillan2; Oxford 1995)
Karl Jaspers (1883–1969) (Cambridge; Macmillan2; Oxford 1995)
Hans Jonas (1903–1993)

== K ==
Immanuel Kant (1724–1804) (Cambridge; Macmillan2; Oxford 1995; Routledge 2000)
Hermann von Keyserling (1880–1946) (Macmillan2)
Ludwig Klages (1872–1956) (Macmillan2)
Heinrich von Kleist (1771–1811) (Cambridge)
Martin Knutzen (1713–1751) (Macmillan2)
Karl C.F. Krause (1781–1832) (Cambridge; Macmillan2)
Felix Krueger (1874–1948) (Macmillan2)
Oswald Kuelpe (1862–1915) (Macmillan2)

== L ==
Ernst Laas (1837–1885) (Macmillan2)
Johann Heinrich Lambert (1728–1777) (Cambridge; Macmillan2; Routledge 2000)
Friedrich Albert Lange (1828–1875) (Cambridge; Macmillan2; Routledge 2000)
Gottfried Wilhelm von Leibniz (1646–1716)
Gotthold Ephraim Lessing (1729–1781) (Cambridge; Oxford 1995)
Dieter Leisegang (1942–1973)
Otto Liebmann (1840–1912) (Macmillan2)
Hans Lipps (1889–1941)
Paul Lorenzen (1915–1994) (Routledge 2000)
Hermann Lotze (1817–1881) (Cambridge; Macmillan2; Oxford 1995)
Karl Löwith (1897–1973) (Metzler)
Georg Lukács (1885–1971) (Cambridge; Macmillan2; Oxford 1995)

== M ==
Ernst Mach (1838–1916) (Cambridge; Macmillan2; Routledge 2000)
Salomon Maimon (1754–1800) (Cambridge; Macmillan2)
Philipp Mainländer (1841–1876)
Herbert Marcuse (1898–1979) (Cambridge; Metzler)
Giwi Margwelaschwili (1927–2020)
Karl Marx (1818–1883) (Cambridge; Stanford)
Fritz Medicus (1876–1956)
Georg Friedrich Meier (1718–1777) (Macmillan2)
Friedrich Meinecke (1862–1954) (Macmillan2)
Alexius Meinong (1853–1920) (Cambridge; Oxford 1995; Routledge 2000)
Moses Mendelssohn (1729–1786) (Cambridge; Macmillan; Macmillan2; Oxford 1995)
Ludwig von Mises (1881–1973)
Jacob Moleschott (1822–1893) (Macmillan2)

== N ==
Arne Næss (1912–2009) (Oxford 1995)
Paul Natorp (1854–1924) (Macmillan)
Leonard Nelson (1882–1927) (Macmillan; Macmillan2)
Friedrich Nietzsche (1844–1900) (Cambridge; Macmillan; Macmillan2; Oxford 1995)
Novalis (1772–1801) (Cambridge)

== P ==
Helmuth Plessner (1892–1985) (Macmillan)
Karl Popper (1902–1994) (Cambridge; Macmillan; Oxford 1995)
Friedrich Paulsen (July 16, 1846–August 14, 1908)

== R ==
Gustav Radbruch (1878–1949) (Routledge 2000)
Paul Rée (1849–1901) (Oxford 1995)
Hans Reichenbach (1891–1953) (Cambridge; Macmillan; Routledge 2000)
Hermann Samuel Reimarus (1694–1768) (Cambridge; Macmillan)
Adolf Reinach (1883–1917) (Routledge 2000)
Karl Leonhard Reinhold (1758–1823) (Cambridge; Macmillan)
Alois Riehl (1844–1924) (Macmillan)
Karl Rosenkranz (1805–1879) (Macmillan)
Franz Rosenzweig (1886–1929) (Cambridge; Metzler; Oxford 1995)

== S ==
Max Scheler (1874–1928) (Cambridge; Macmillan; Oxford 1995; Routledge 2000)
Friedrich Wilhelm Joseph von Schelling (1775–1854) (Cambridge; Macmillan; Oxford 1995)
Friedrich Schiller (1759–1805) (Cambridge; Macmillan; Oxford 1995)
Friedrich von Schlegel (1772–1829) (Cambridge; Macmillan)
Friedrich Schleiermacher (1768–1834) (Cambridge)
Moritz Schlick (1882–1936) (Macmillan; Oxford 1995)
Arthur Schopenhauer (1788–1860) (Cambridge; Macmillan; Oxford 1995; Routledge 2000)
Rudolf Schottlaender (1900–1988)
Burghart Schmidt (1942–2022)
Gottlob Ernst Schulze (1761–1833) (Cambridge)
Alfred Schütz (1899–1959) (Routledge 2000)
Christoph von Sigwart (1830–1904) (Macmillan)
Georg Simmel (1858–1918) (Cambridge; Routledge 2000)
Peter Sloterdijk (born 1947)
Karl Wilhelm Ferdinand Solger (1780–1819) (Macmillan)
Robert Spaemann (1927–2018)
Oswald Spengler (1880–1936)
Afrikan Spir (1837–1890) (Cambridge)
Rudolf Steiner (1861–1925) (Macmillan)
Bertrand Stern (born 1948)
Max Stirner (nom de plume for Johann Kaspar Schmidt) (1806–1856) (Cambridge; Macmillan; Oxford 1995)
Leo Strauss (1899–1973) (Routledge 2000)
Karl Stumpf (1848–1936) (Macmillan)

== T ==
Gustav Teichmüller (1832–1888) (Cambridge)
Johannes Nikolaus Tetens (1736–1807) (Cambridge; Macmillan; Routledge 2000)
Christian Thomasius (1655–1728) (Macmillan; Sassen)
Ernst Troeltsch (1865–1923) (Cambridge; Routledge 2000)
Ernst Tugendhat (1930–2023) leading analytical philosopher, books on Aristoteles, Heidegger, ethics
Thomas Wizenmann (1759 – 1787)

== V ==
Hans Vaihinger (1852–1933) (Cambridge; Macmillan; Oxford 1995; Routledge 2000)
Friedrich Theodor Vischer (1807–1887) (Macmillan)

== W ==
Richard Wahle (1857–1935) (Macmillan)
Max Weber (1864–1920) (Macmillan)
Otto Weininger (1880–1903)
Christian Hermann Weisse (1801–1866)
Hermann Weyl (1885–1955) (Macmillan)
Wilhelm Windelband (1848–1915) (Cambridge; Macmillan)
Ludwig Wittgenstein (1889–1951) (Cambridge; Macmillan; Oxford 1995)
Christian Wolff (1679–1754) (Cambridge; Macmillan; Oxford 1995; Routledge 2000; Sassen)
Wilhelm Wundt (1832–1920) (Cambridge; Macmillan; Routledge 2000)

== Z ==
Eduard Zeller (1814–1908) (Macmillan)

== See also ==
- List of Germans
- List of German journalists
- List of German-language poets
- List of German-language authors
- German philosophy
- List of philosophers
- List of philosophers born in the eleventh through fourteenth centuries
- List of philosophers born in the fifteenth and sixteenth centuries
- List of philosophers born in the seventeenth century
- List of philosophers born in the eighteenth century
- List of philosophers born in the nineteenth century
- List of philosophers born in the twentieth century
- List of years in philosophy
