= Geinitz =

Geinitz is a German surname. Notable people with the surname include:

- Eugen Geinitz (1854–1925), German geologist and mineralogist, son of Hanns
- Hanns Bruno Geinitz (1814–1900), German geologist
