= Wüstnei =

Wüstnei is a German surname. Notable persons with the surname include:

- Carl Wüstnei (1843–1902), German engineer, artist and ornithologist
- Karl Georg Gustav Wüstnei (1810–1858), German teacher and naturalist
