= Clodius (disambiguation) =

Clodius is an alternate form of the Roman nomen Claudius. It may also refer to:

- Frederick Clod or Clodius (1625–after 1661), alchemist in London
- Gustav Clodius (1866–1944), German pastor and ornithologist
- Julie Clodius (1750–1805), German philosopher
- Karl Clodius, German World War II diplomat known for negotiating the 1941 Clodius Agreement with Turkey
- Robert Clodius (1921–2014), American educator and university administrator
- Clodius, a character in the 1834 novel The Last Days of Pompeii by Edward Bulwer-Lytton

== See also ==
- Parnassius clodius, a butterfly
- Clodia (wife of Metellus), sister of Clodius Pulcher
- Leges Clodiae, legislation sponsored by Clodius Pulcher as tribune in the 1st century BC
