= Hemilampronites =

Hemilampronites Temporal range: Turonian–Maastrichtian

Scientific classification
- Kingdom: Animalia
- Phylum: Chordata
- Class: Actinopterygii
- Order: Beloniformes (?)
- Genus: †Hemilampronites; Geinitz, 1868

Species
- H. steinlai Geinitz, 1868; H. hesperius Cockerell, 1917

Synonyms
- Cyclolepis stenodinus Cockerell, 1919

Extinct genus of fishes

Hemilampronites is a prehistoric genus of marine ray-finned fish from the Late Cretaceous. It contains two species, both known from isolated scales: H. steinlai Geinitz, 1868 known from the Turonian of Germany & H. hesperius Cockerell, 1917, known from the Maastrichtian-aged Fox Hills Formation of Colorado, US. Unverifiable records of H. hesperius have also been noted from the Maastrichtian-aged Quiriquina Formation of Chile.

The scales closely resemble those of the modern halfbeak Hyporhamphus, and also resemble those of the Scomberesocidae and Exocoetidae. A close relationship to the modern Beloniformes has thus been suggested; however, as the Beloniformes have a sparse fossil record & no Cretaceous body fossils of them are known, and the only fossils of Hemilampronites are isolated scales, the proper classification of this genus remains uncertain.
