= Schelfstadt =

Coordinates: 53°38′01″N 11°24′58″E

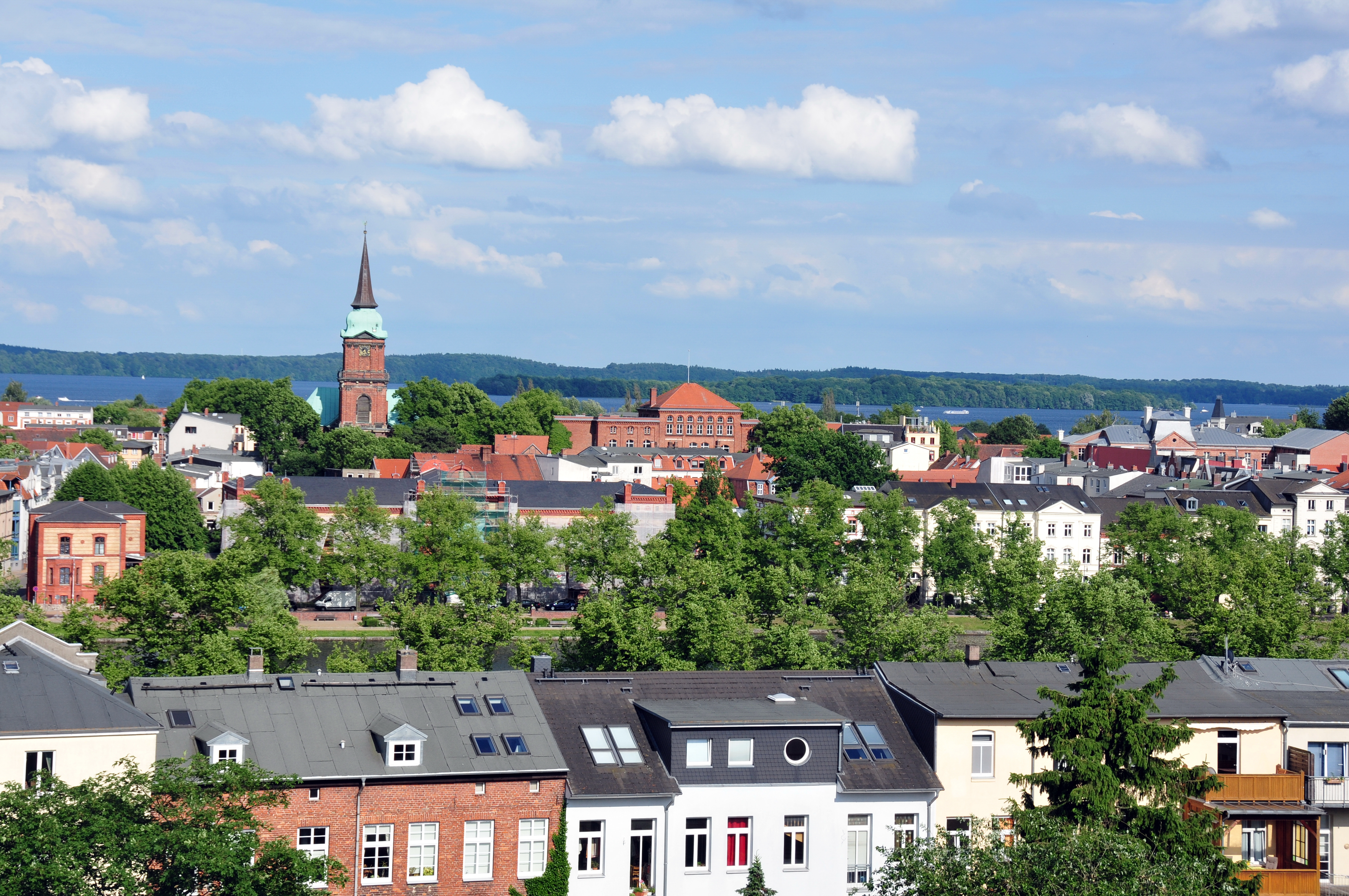
Overview of the Schelfstadt quarter

Schelfstadt is a central quarter of the city of Schwerin, capital of the Mecklenburg-Vorpommern state of Germany.

== Gallery ==
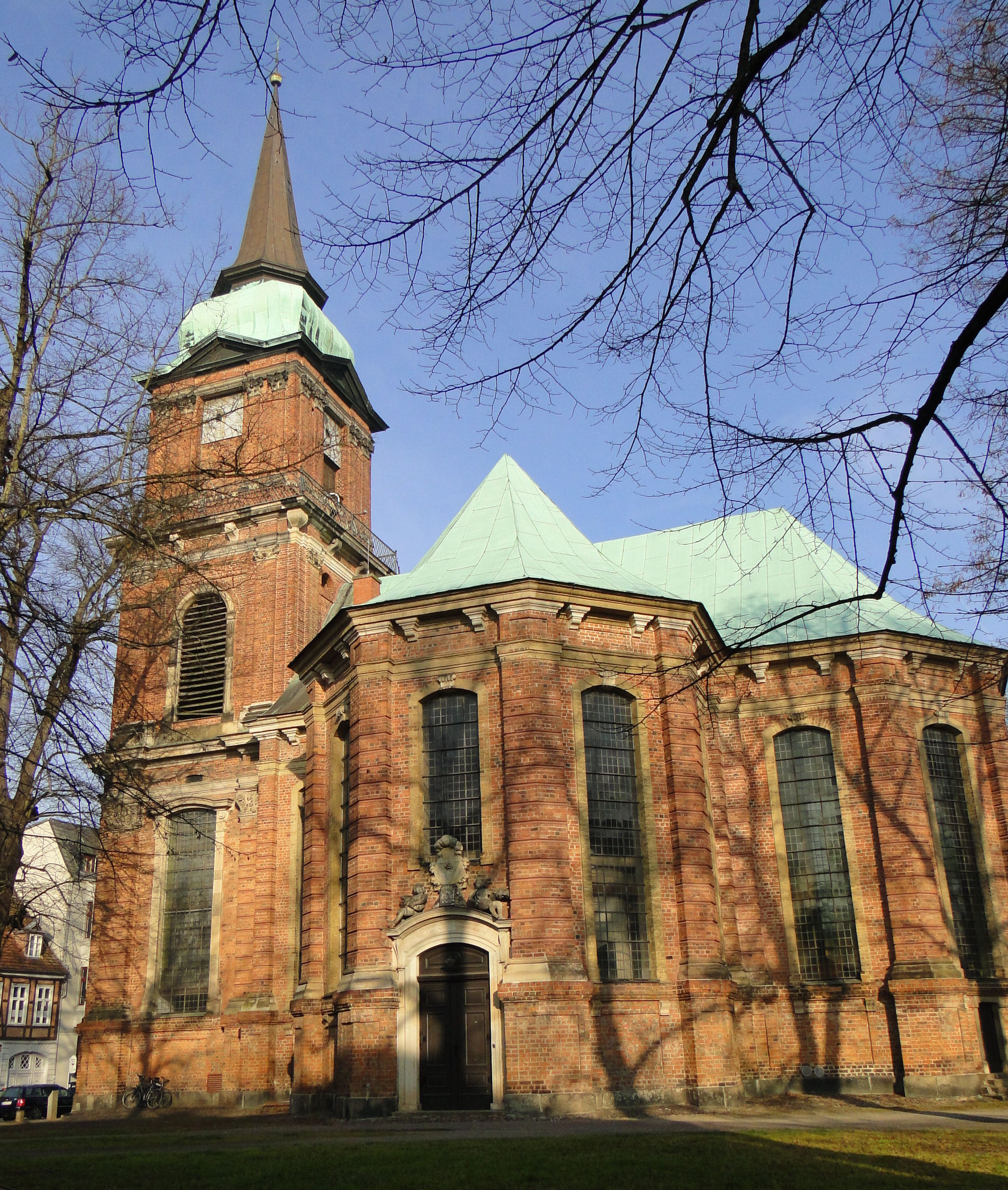
Baroque Schelf Church

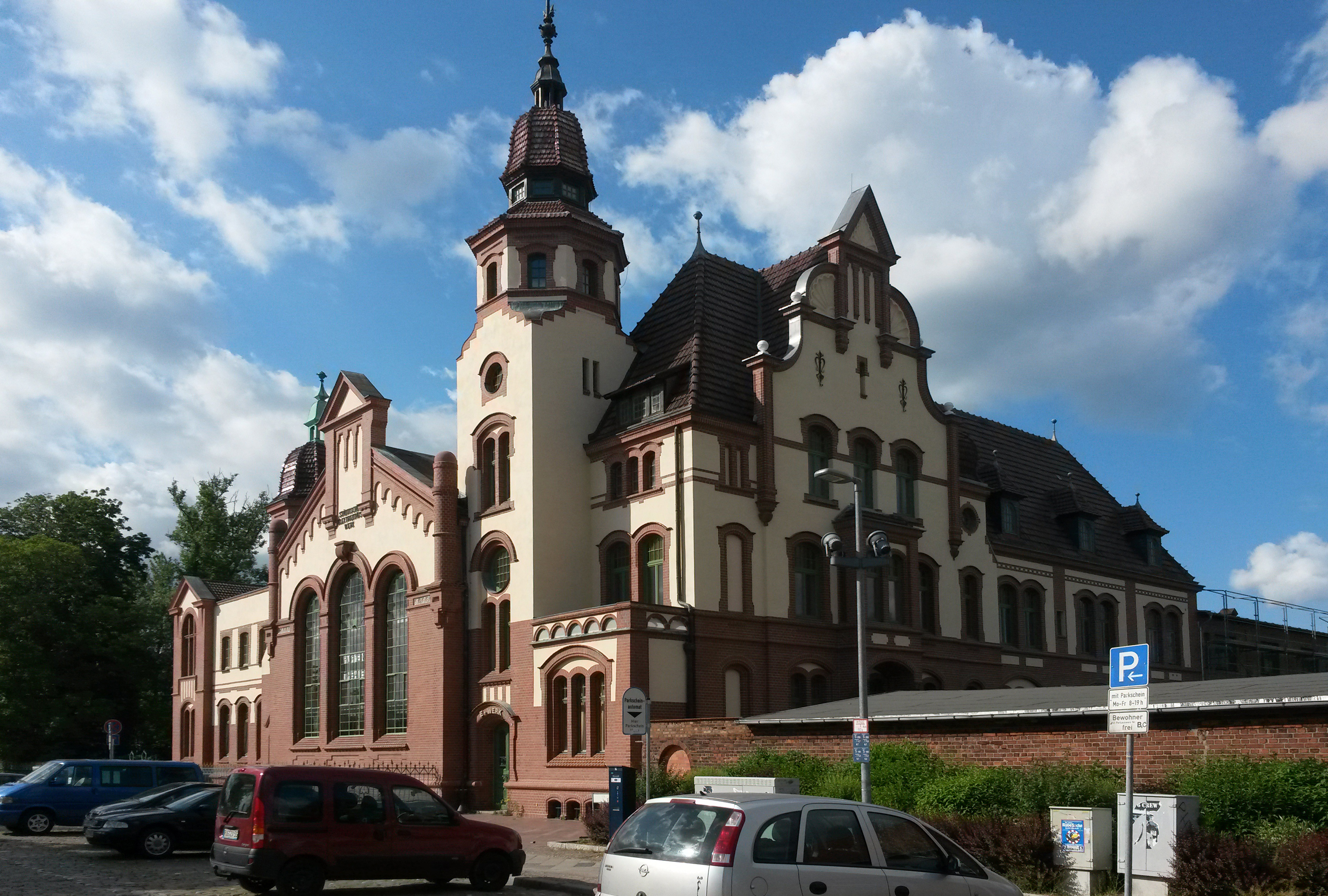
Former Electricity Powerstation (E-Werk) at Pfaffenteich, today a cultural centre for theatre plays

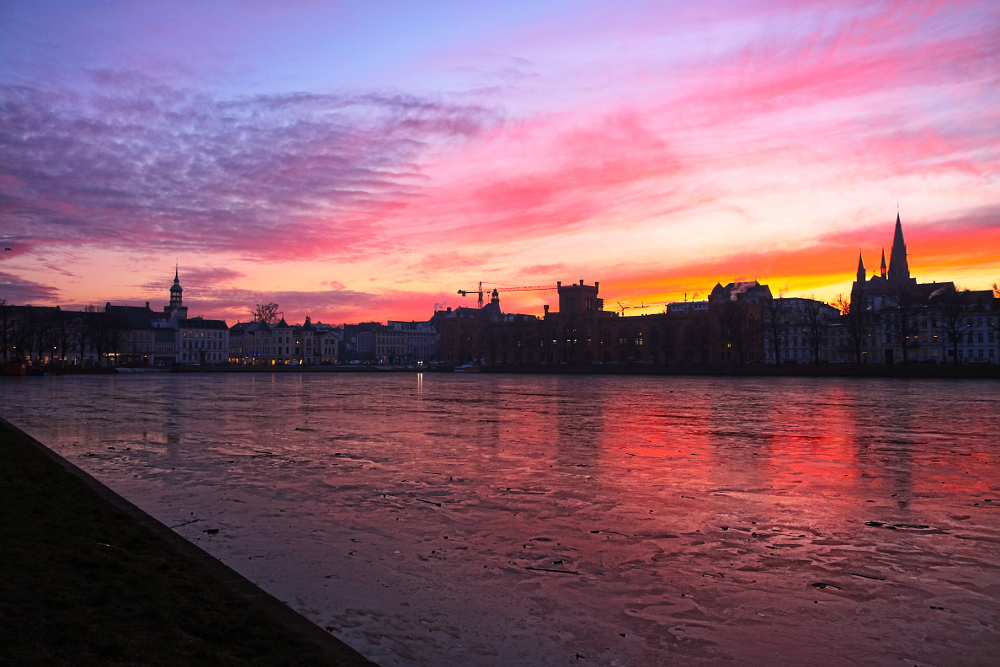
Pfaffenteich

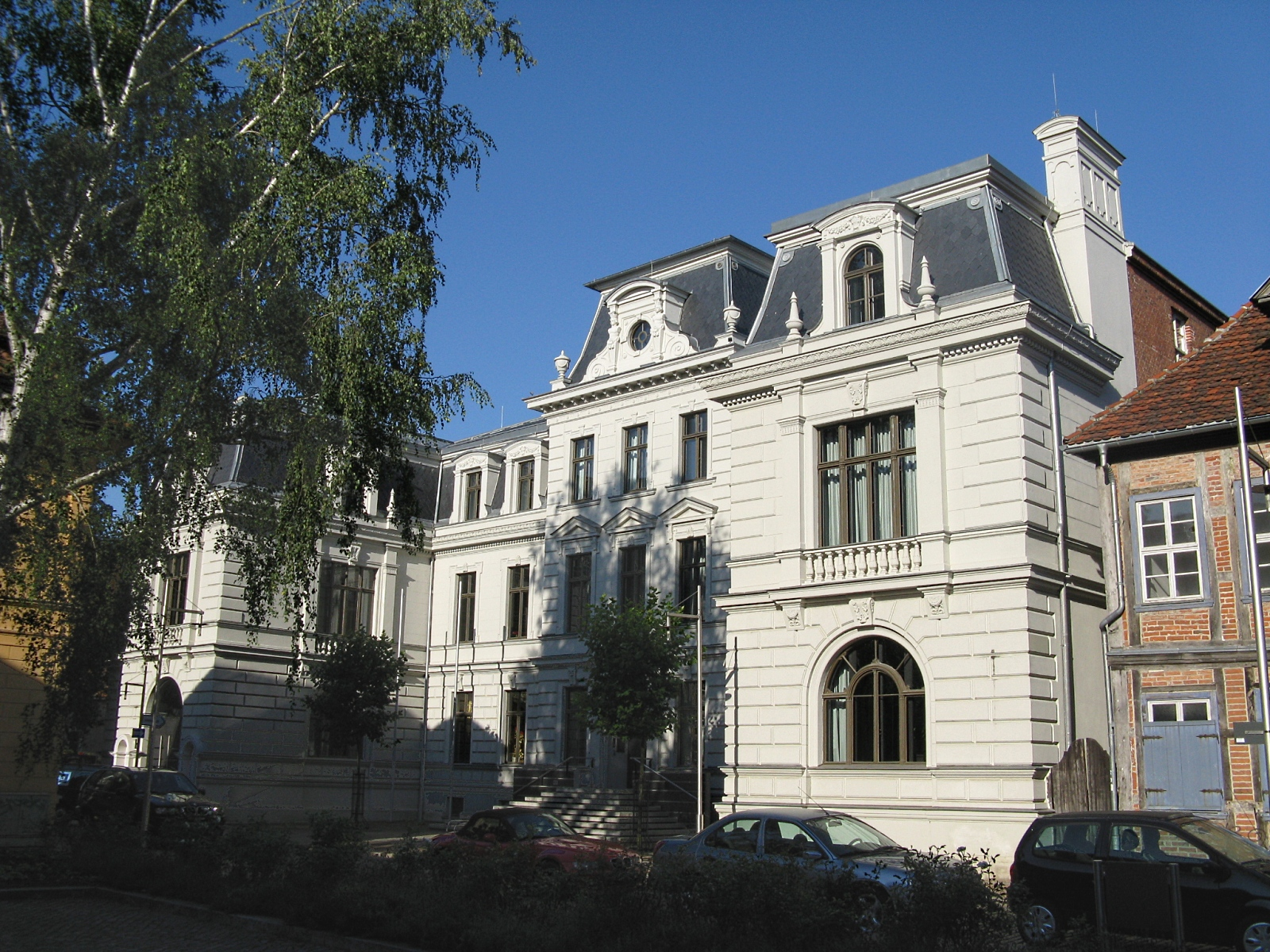
Neustädtisches Palais

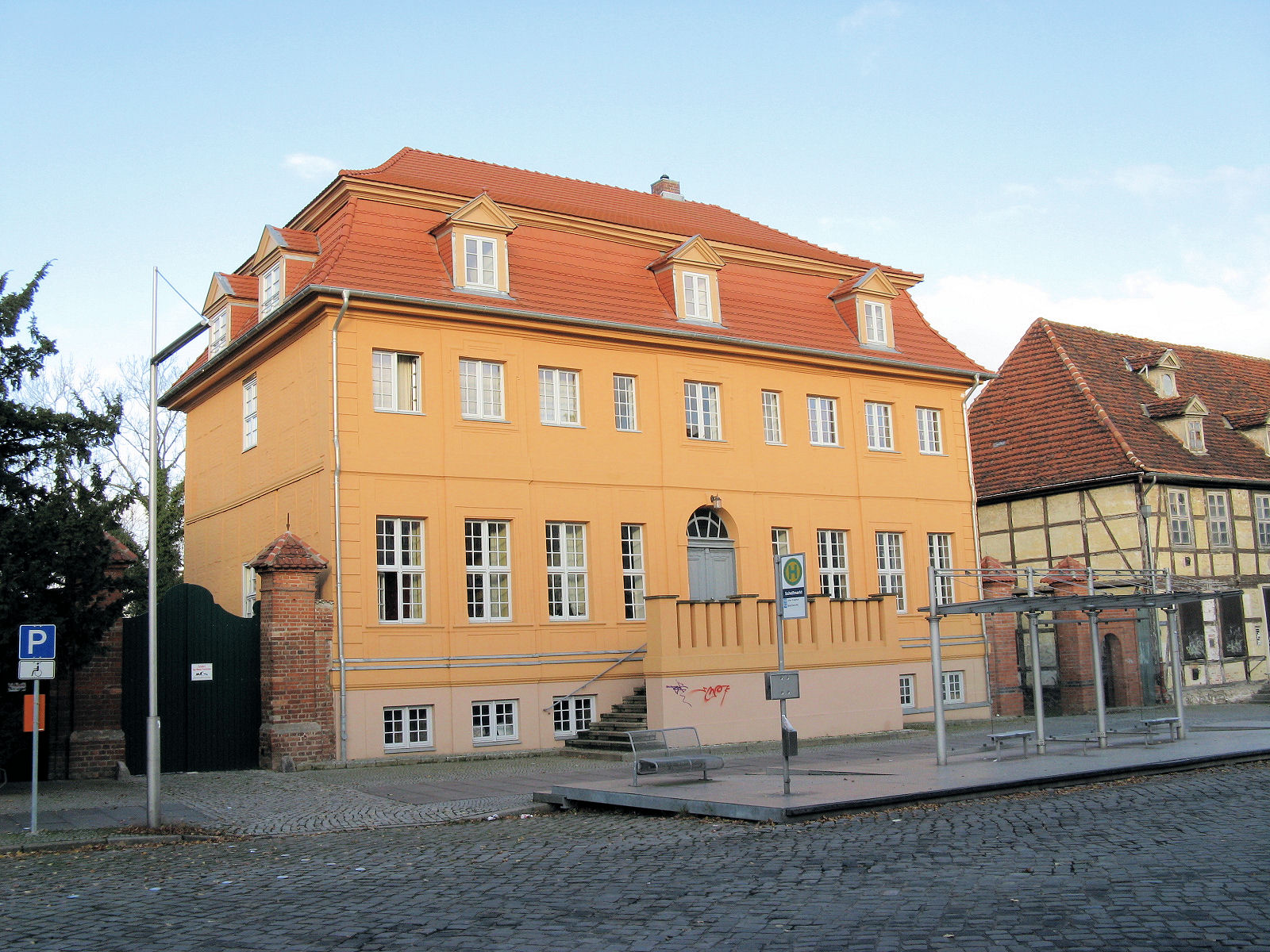
Neustädtisches Rathaus, former Schelfstadt town hall at Schelfmarkt

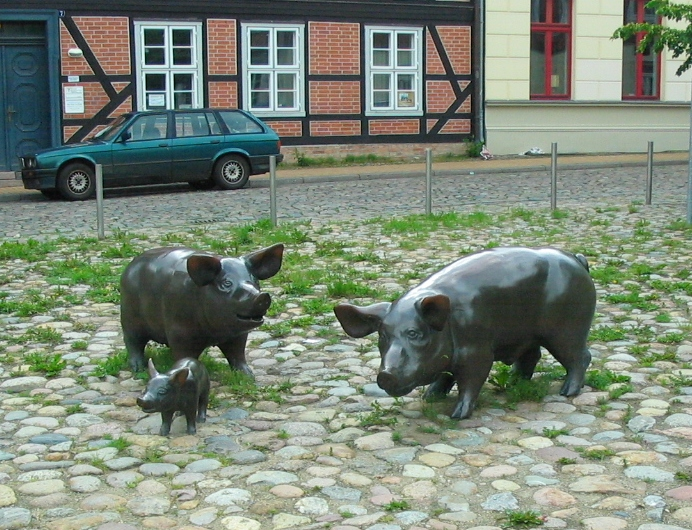
Schweinemarkt

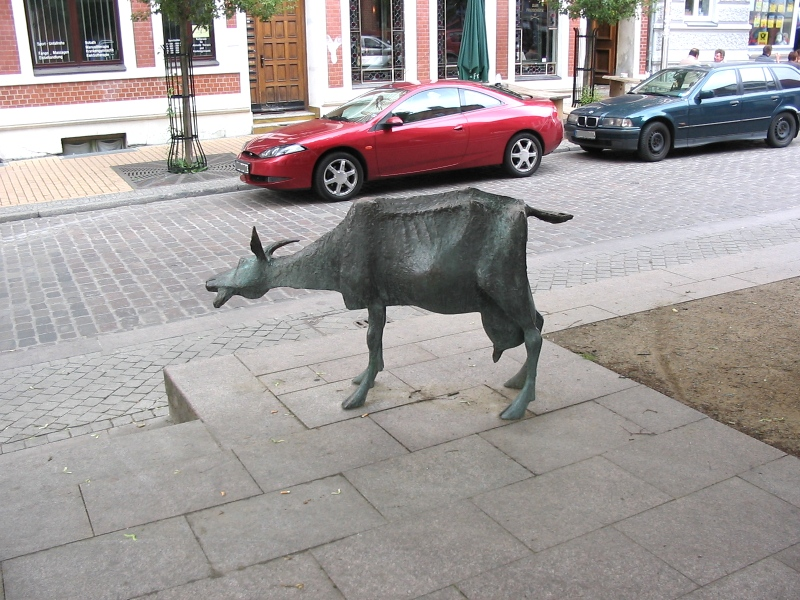
Ziegenmarkt

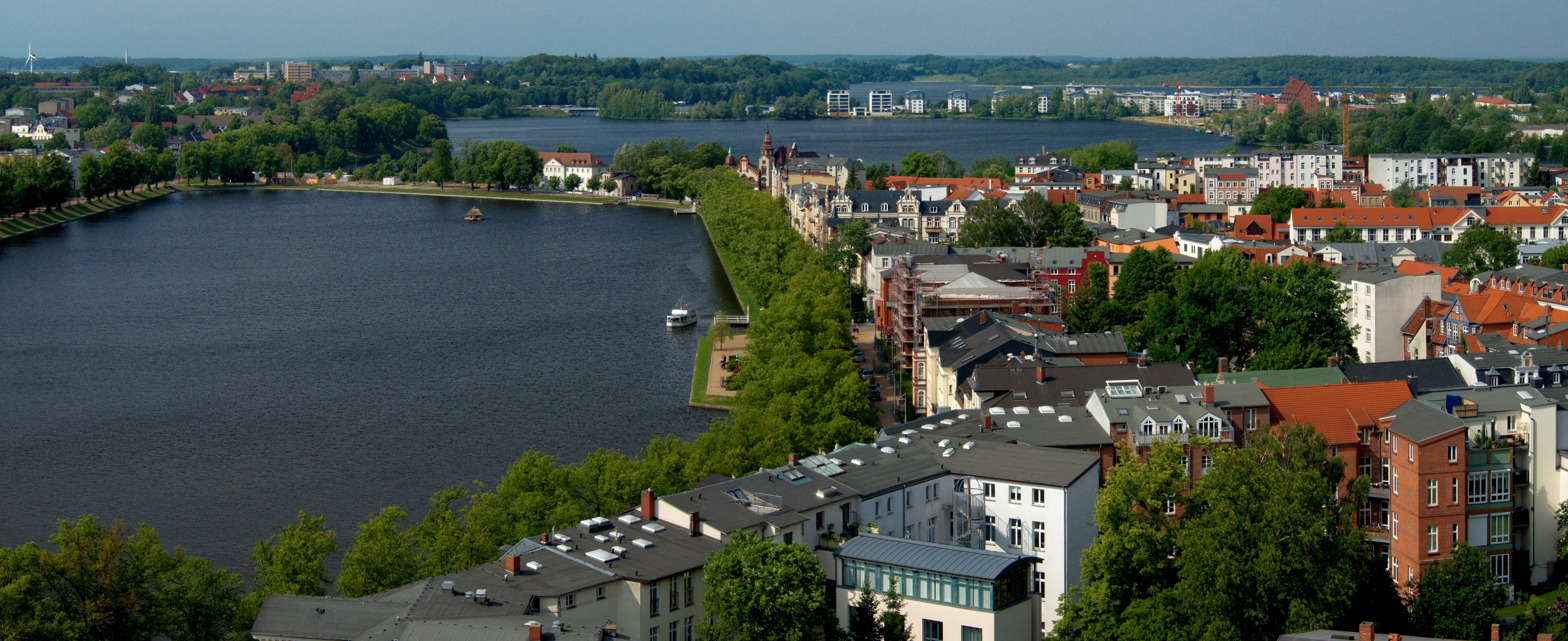
Docks

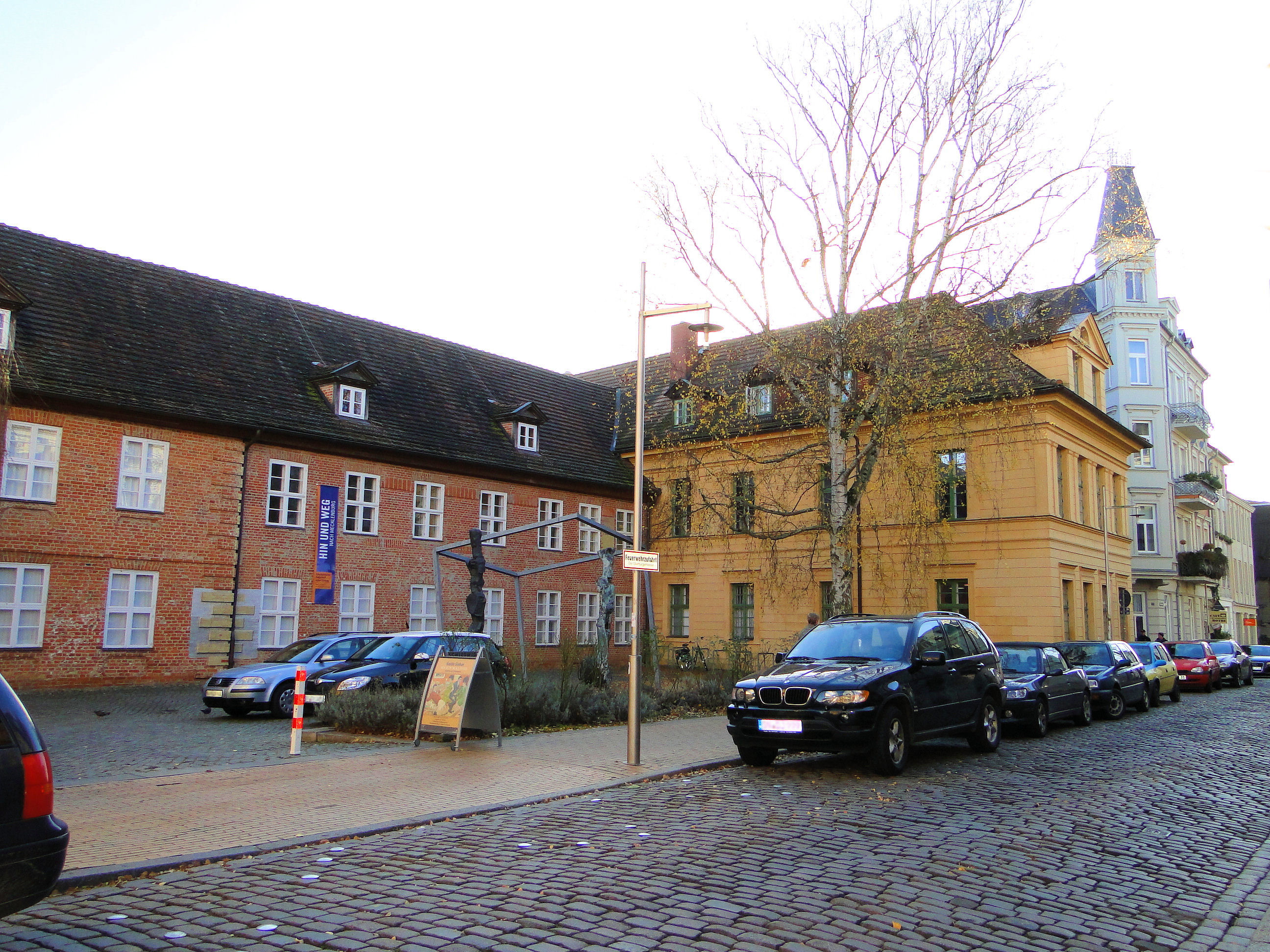
Schleswig-Holstein-Haus

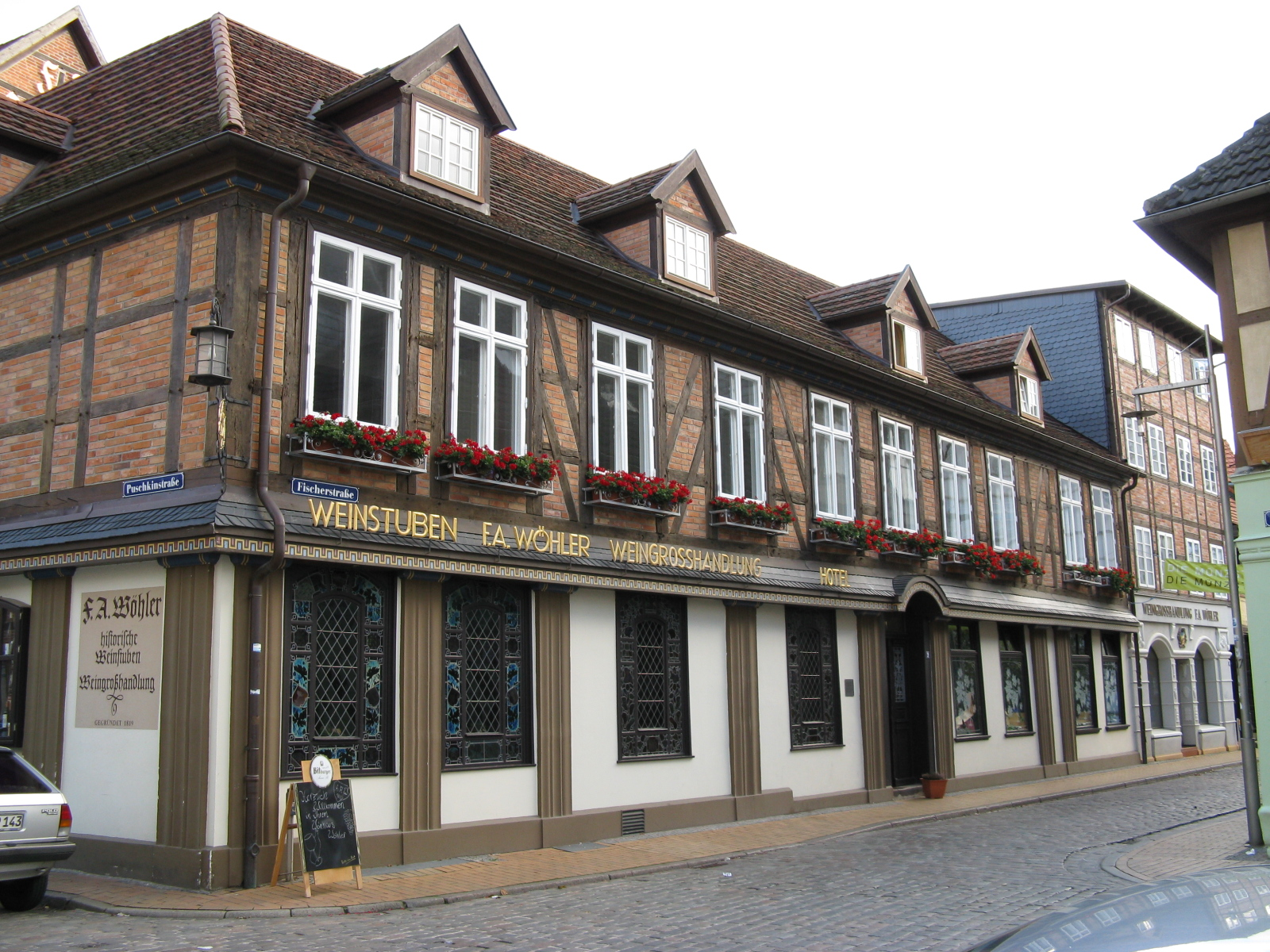
Weinstuben Wöhler, Fischerstrasse

== Notable people ==
- Karl Georg Gustav Wüstnei, 19th-century naturalist and botanist, namesake of fungus and insect species.
- Carl Wüstnei, 19-century ornithologist: author of Die Vögel der Grossherzogthümer Mecklenburg [The Birds of the Grand Duchy of Mecklenburg] (1900), often considered the "Mecklenburg bird bible"
