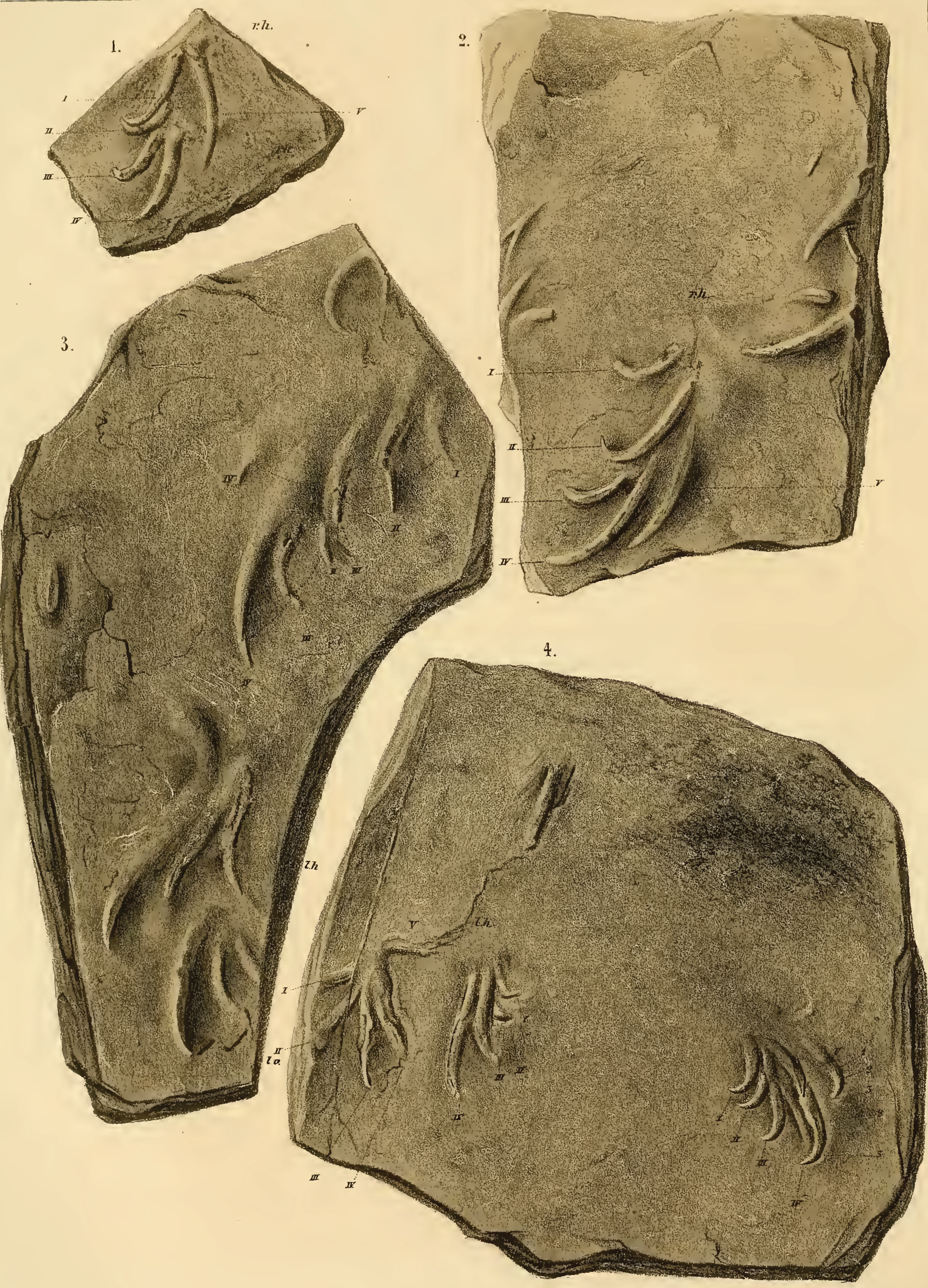
- Plate of D. lacertoides tracks, as figured by Hanns Bruno Geinitz

Trace fossil classification
- Kingdom: Animalia
- Phylum: Chordata
- Class: Reptilia
- Ichnogenus: †Dromopus; Marsh, 1894

Type ichnospecies
- †Saurichnites lacertoides Geinitz, 1861

Ichnospecies
- Dromopus lacertoides (Geinitz, 1861; type); ?Dromopus agilis Marsh, 1894; ?Dromopus didactylus (Moodie, 1930)

Synonyms
- Protritonichnites Pohlig, 1892; Eumekichnium Nopcsa, 1923; Gampsodactylum Nopcsa, 1923

= Dromopus =

Dromopus Temporal range: Moscovian-Changhsingian

Trace fossil

Dromopus is a reptilian ichnogenus commonly found in assemblages of ichnofossils dating to the late Pennsylvanian (Moscovian stage) to the late Permian (Changhsingian stage). It has been found throughout Europe, as well as in the United States, Canada, and Morocco. Several ichnospecies have been named; only the type ichnospecies D. lacertoides is definitively recognized.

== History ==
=== Species ===
Originally named as an ichnospecies of Saurichnites by Hanns Bruno Geinitz in 1861, S. lacertoides was transferred to the newly created genus Dromopus by Othniel Charles Marsh in 1894, along with a new ichnospecies D. agilis from the United States.

In 1929, Roy Moodie described two-digit traces from the Red Beds of Texas under the ichnospecies Varanopus palmatus, V. impressus, V. elrodi, and V. didactylus. However, these were subsequently considered to represent a single ichnospecies of Dromopus by William Sarjeant. Because the type specimen of V. palmatus is broken, and V. impressus and V. elrodi are incomplete, Dromopus didactylus is generally the preferred name.

In 1963 and 1964, Paul Ellenberger described many ichnospecies of Dromopus: D. neooctavianensis, D. brevidigitatus, D. duidigitatus, D. octavianensis, D. bidigitatus, D. curtidigitus, D. inversidigitulifer, D. rabejacensis, D. rectidigitus, D. rectangulus, D. exsultans, and D. cursor. Harmut Haubold considered them invalid in a 2000 review.

There have been disagreements about whether the North American D. agilis represents a separate ichnospecies. More recently, based on the fact that there is no satisfactory anatomical diagnosis distinguishing various ichnospecies of Dromopus, only the type ichnospecies D. lacertoides has been agreed to be valid.

=== Synonyms ===
In 1892, Pohlig used the new ichnogenus Protritonichnites for the ichnospecies Saurichnites lacertoides, before Marsh had named Dromopus. By the principles of synonymy, Protritonichnites should have priority over Dromopus. However, in 1970, Haubold argued that this name was largely unused by this point, and it was also based on a less taxonomically sound definition. Although some European researchers during the 1980s persisted in using the name Protritonichnites, Dromopus has generally found more widespread adoption. Other synonyms include Eumekichnium, named by Franz Nopcsa in 1923, including the type ichnospecies E. longipollex, as well as E. gampsodactylum and E. pachydactylum (both formerly Ichnium); and Gampsodactylum, also named by Nopcsa in 1923, including the type ichnospecies G. alberdorfense as well as G. friedrichrodanum and G. kabarzense.

== Description ==
Dromopus lacertoides tracks are characterized by five-fingered hand and foot imprints up to 6 centimetres (2.4 in) long, about a third longer than they are wide, with a short palm and long, slender, tapered digits. The length of the digits increases from the first to the fourth, with the fifth having the same length as the second. The hand and foot imprints are not particularly distinct. D. didactylus tracks are based on similar tracks, but where the imprints of all but two digits are faint.

Dromopus tracks have been ascribed to lizard-like reptiles, including the diapsid Araeoscelidia and the parareptilian Bolosauridae.
