= Gustav Clodius =

German pastor and ornithologist

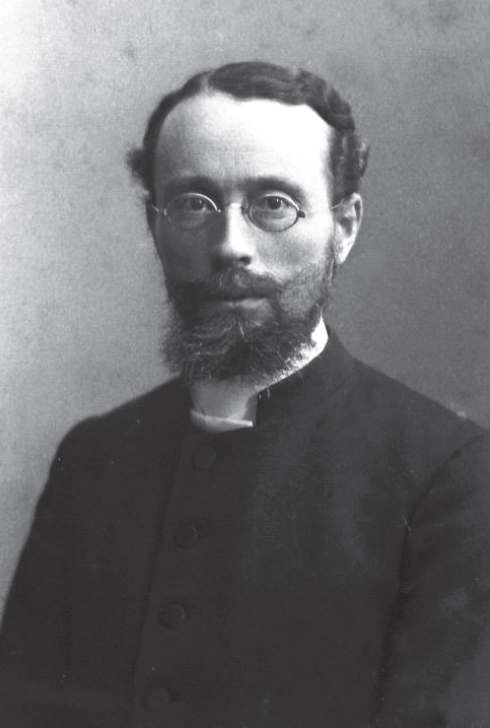
Clodius c. 1900

Gustav Karl Heinrich Wilhelm Clodius (26 August 1866 – 5 November 1944) was a German pastor, antiquarian, and naturalist who contributed to studies on the birds of West Pomerania. Along with Carl Wüstnei he published a book on the birds of the Grand Duchy of Mecklenburg which includes historical information on the nesting of white storks in the region.

Clodius was born in Camin near Wittenburg, son of Lutheran pastor Gustav (the elder, 1824–1904) and Maria Caroline Luise née Flörke (1828–1922). He studied locally where he was influenced by Kantor Burgdorf who showed him stuffed birds. He then entered the Gymnasium Fridericianum in Schwerin and graduated in 1886 to join the University of Rostock to study theology. After studies in Erlangen and Greifswald he graduated from Rostock and became a private tutor in Lenschow. In 1894 he became a preacher at Retschow and the next year vice-rector at Grabow. In 1896 he returned to his hometown of Camin to succeed his father. From an early age he took an interest in birds, joining the friend of natural history in Mecklenburg in 1886. He collaborated with Carl Wüstnei, a railway engineer to work on a reliable ornithology of the Mecklenburg region which was finally published in 1900. It described 289 species with information on breeding and other aspects.

Clodius also took an interest in local history and collaborated with Robert Beltz and the mineralogist Eugen Geinitz. Clodius married Emilie Caroline Mathilde Ida Zuberbier (1870–1909) in 1895 and after her death he married her sister Adolfine (Mauritie) Zuberbier (1873–1929) in 1910. He had five children in all.
