= Fritz Medicus =

German-Swiss philosopher (1876–1956)

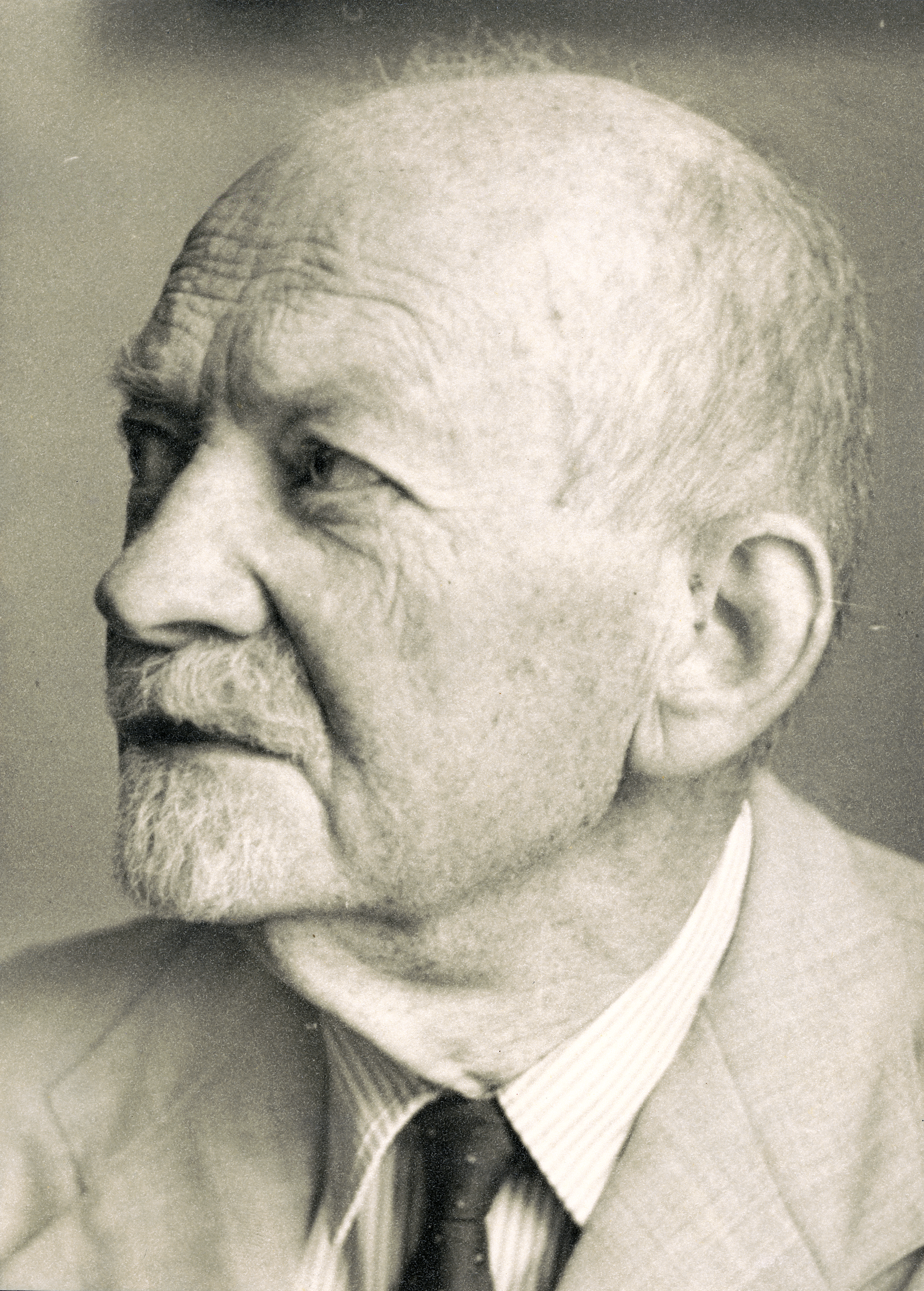
- Fritz Medicus, c. 1945
- Born: April 23, 1876; Stadtlauringen, Germany
- Died: January 13, 1956 (aged 79); Zürich, Switzerland
- Occupation: philosopher

Fritz Medicus (April 23, 1876 – January 13, 1956) was a German-Swiss philosopher. He was awarded his doctorate while studying in Jena, with the publication of his dissertation, Kant's transcendental aesthetics and non-euclidian geometry. He was the Chair of Philosophy at the Martin Luther University of Halle-Wittenberg, and moved to ETH Zurich in 1911. Medicus wrote in the tradition of German idealism.

== See also ==
- List of German-language philosophers
