= Carl Wüstnei =

German engineer and ornithologist (1843–1902)

Carl Wüstnei (19 September 1843 – 21 December 1902) was a German ornithologist, engineer, and artist. In 1900, he published Die Vögel der Grossherzogthümer Mecklenburg ( "The Birds of the Grand Duchy of Mecklenburg"), a book on the birds of the Mecklenburg region, in collaboration with Gustav Clodius.

== Life and work ==
Wüstnei was born in Schelfstadt, Schwerin where his father Karl Georg Gustav Wüstnei (1810-1858, a fungus Wuestneia is named after him) was a teacher, theologian and naturalist. He went to the Gymnasium Fridericianum Schwerin. His father died when he was young and he then went to the Brockelmanns iron foundry as an apprentice.

Subsequently, his education was supported by Grand Duke Friedrich Franz II in 1867 and he went to study at the Königliche Gewerbeakademie zu Berlin (predecessor of Technische Universität Berlin). He then became a railway engineer at Mecklenburg. After his retirement in 1895, he became more active in ornithological work. In 1901, he produced statistics on the nesting of white storks in the region in collaboration with Gustav Clodius. Their earlier work on the birds of Mecklenburg was considered the "Mecklenburg bird bible" and it described 289 species.
