= Wuestneia =

Scientific classification
- Kingdom: Fungi
- Division: Ascomycota
- Class: Sordariomycetes
- Order: Diaporthales
- Family: Melanconidaceae
- Genus: Wuestneia; Auersw. ex Fuckel

Type species
- Wuestneia aurea Auersw.

Genus of fungi

Wuestneia is a genus of fungi within the Melanconidaceae family.

The genus was circumscribed by Bernhard Auerswald ex Karl Wilhelm Gottlieb Leopold Fuckel in Arch. Vereins Freunde Naturgesch. Mecklenburg vol,13 on page 177 in 1859 (Secondary Literature).

The genus name of Wuestneia is in honour of Karl Georg Gustav Wüstnei (1810–1858), who was a German teacher and also botanist and Entomologist. He taught Mathematics and Natural Sciences in schools in Schwerin, Germany.

== Species ==
As accepted by Species Fungorum;

- Wuestneia acericola J. Reid & C. Booth (1989)
- Wuestneia beltsvillensis (Petr.) J. Reid & C. Booth (1989)
- Wuestneia campanulata Z.Q. Yuan (1997)
- Wuestneia chrysostroma (Fr.) U. Braun & Bensch (2021)
- Wuestneia epispora Z.Q. Yuan (1997)
- Wuestneia eucalyptorum Crous, M.J. Wingf. & Nag Raj (1993)
- Wuestneia fusca (Nag Raj & DiCosmo) J. Reid & C. Booth (1989)
- Wuestneia guajavae (H. Kern) J. Reid & C. Booth (1989)
- Wuestneia karwarrae (B. Sutton & Pascoe) Z.Q. Yuan (1997)
- Wuestneia molokaiensis Crous & J.D. Rogers (2001)
- Wuestneia paucispora (Peck) J. Reid & C. Booth (1989)
- Wuestneia punctistoma (Ellis) J. Reid & C. Booth (1989)
- Wuestneia tetraspora (Tak. Kobay.) J. Reid & C. Booth (1989)

Former species;

- W. aurea (Fuckel) Auersw. ex Fuckel (1864) = Wuestneia chrysostroma
- W. compta (Tul. & C. Tul.) J. Reid & C. Booth (1989) = Cryptosporella compta, Gnomoniaceae
- W. farinosa (Ellis) J. Reid & C. Booth (1989) = Harknessia farinosa, Harknessiaceae
- W. hypodermia (Fr.) Ananthap. (1988) = Cryptosporella hypodermia, Gnomoniaceae
- W. karvarrae (B. Sutton & Pascoe) Z.Q. Yuan (1997) = Wuestneia karwarrae
- W. fibrosa (Pers.) Auersw. (1863) = Diaporthe fibrosa
- W. sphinctrina (Fr.) Auersw. (1865) = Anthostoma dryophilum, Diatrypaceae
- W. stilbostoma (Fr.) Auersw. (1863) = Melanconis stilbostoma, Melanconidaceae
- W. suffusa (Fr.) Auersw. (1863) = Cryptosporella suffusa, Gnomoniaceae
- W. tessera (Fr.) Auersw. (1863) = Diaporthe tessera
- W. xanthostroma (Fr.) J. Reid & C. Booth (1989) = Wuestneia chrysostroma
- W. xanthostroma var. dearnessii J. Reid & C. Booth (1989) = Wuestneia chrysostroma
