= Thomas Wizenmann =

German philosopher (1759 – 1787)

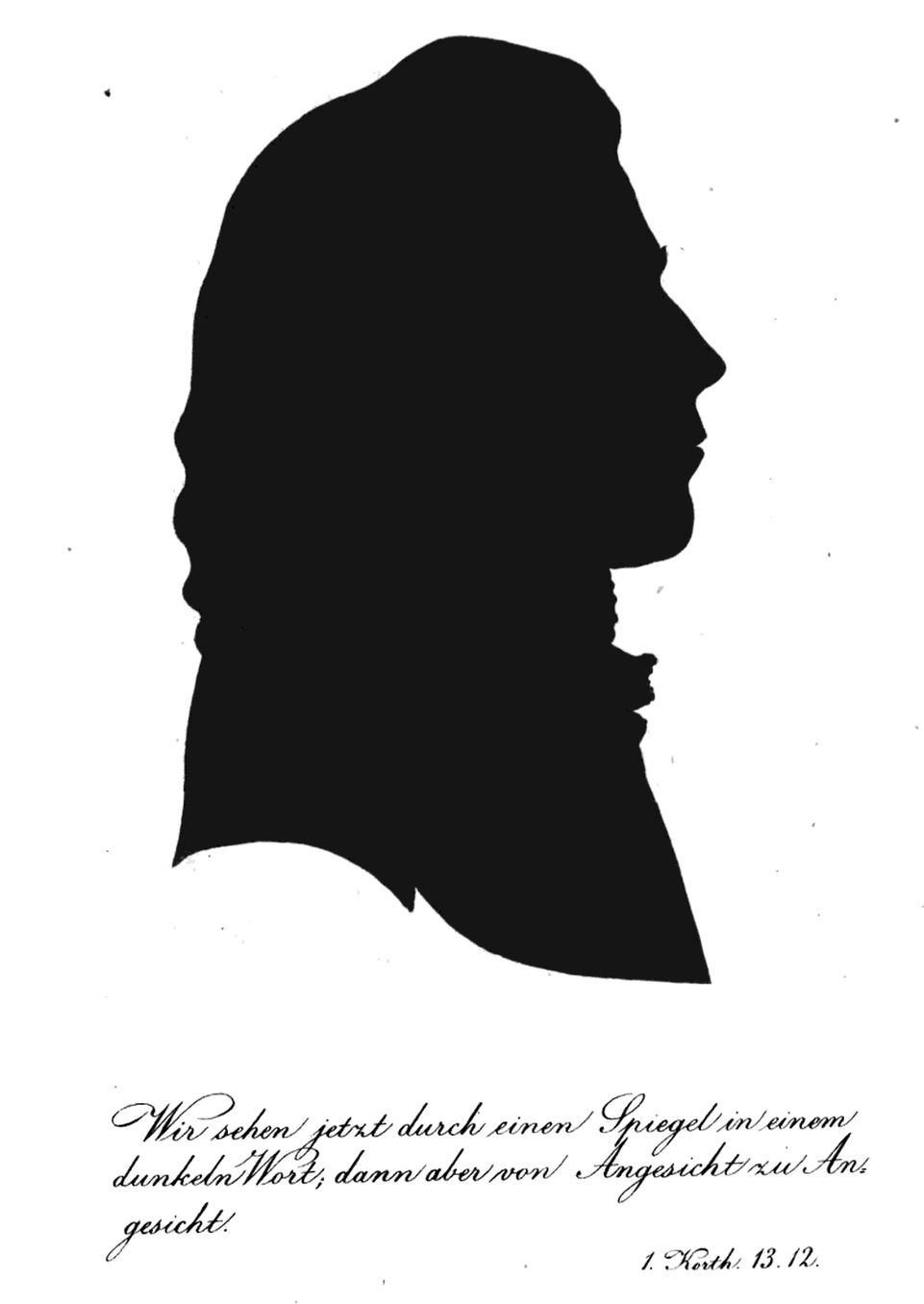
- Born: November 2, 1759; Ludwigsburg, Duchy of Württemberg
- Died: February 22, 1787 (aged 27); Mülheim an der Ruhr, Duchy of Westphalia

Thomas Wizenmann (November 2, 1759 – February 22, 1787) was a German philosopher of the Enlightenment, a critic of Kant and Mendelssohn during the Pantheism controversy. He wrote Die Resultate der Jacobischer und Mendelsohnischen Philosophie kritisch erläutert von einem Freywilligen. Wizenmann was a follower of F. H. Jacobi, a critic of Enlightenment Rationalism. Wizenmann was a pietist.
