= Richard Wahle =

Austrian philosopher (1857–1935)

Richard Wahle (February 14, 1857, Vienna – October 21, 1935, Vienna) was professor of philosophy at the Universities of Czernowitz and Vienna.

Wahle pronounced in his Tragicomedy of Wisdom (2nd edition, 1925) on what he acknowledged as only "definite, agnostic, absolute critique of knowledge" and psychology as surviving, or rather maintained that critiques of knowledge, logic and psychology have nothing to do with philosophy. As a consequence of his fundamental attitude, Wahle did not recognize the ego as a nucleus of forces but only as an imprint in the texture of the universe.

In his Formation of Character (2nd edition, 1928) Wahle made important contributions to modern characterology. Wahle's devastating criticism of philosophers spared only a few, including Spinoza, Hamann and Herbart, in whom he praised usefulness.

== Works ==
- Gehirn und Bewusstsein, 1884
- Die geometrische Methode des Spinoza, 1888
- Das Ganze der Philosophie und ihr Ende, 1894
- Über den Mechanismus des geistigen Lebens, 1906
- Grundlagen einer neuen Psychiatrie, 1931
