= Dieter Leisegang =

German translator (1942–1973)

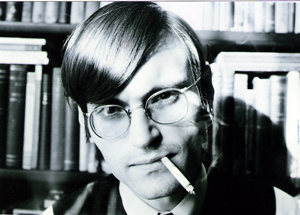
Dieter Leisegang

Dieter Leisegang (November 25, 1942, in Wiesbaden – March 21, 1973, in Offenbach am Main) was a German author, philosopher, and broadcaster.

== Life ==
Dieter Leisegang was born on November 25, 1942, the eleventh child of painter and cartographer Gustav Engelbert Leisegang (1896-1972) and Margaretha Gretel Horn (1904-1980). Dieter spent his childhood in the city of Wiesbaden until his family relocated to Offenbach am Main in 1959. His first literary works and poems appeared in the 1950s and were published in newspapers, magazines, and anthologies.

After graduating from secondary school, Leisegang attended Johann Wolfgang Goethe University (Frankfurt am Main) for several years. In 1963 he met publisher and typographer Horst Heiderhoff, together with whom he released the poetry series "Das Neuste Gedicht" ("The Newest Poem"). In the same year, however, Leisegang was forced to take a break from his studies at the university, due to a serious lung condition. After an operation, he was able to return to his studies in 1967. Already during his years at university, Leisegang worked a variety of different jobs: as a teaching assistant for an aesthetics course at the Werkkunstschule (College of Design) (in Offenbach) (1968–1960); as a lecturer for text and rhetoric at the Technical College for Industrial Advertising and Sales Promotion (in Kassel) (1968–1971); and as a freelancer in the editorial department “Art and Literature” for the Hessischer Rundfunk (Hessisch Broadcasting).

In 1969 Leisegang finished his doctorate in philosophy (under philosophers Julius Jakob Schaaf and Theodor W. Adorno) at the Johann Wolfgang Goethe University with a dissertation titled Die drei Potenzen der Relation (Frankfurt: Heiderhoff, 1969) (The Three Powers of Relation). In his dissertation Leisegang took Schaaf's approach of "Universal Relational Theory" and developed it further into a "draft of a philosophy of relationships". Commenting on Leisegang's Die drei Potenzen der Relation, Schaaf stated that "Leisegang leaves behind a self-contained philosophical oeuvre, in which, with a staggering systematic power at the highest level of both introspection and argumentation, profound historical knowledge of the entire history of philosophy seamlessly unites". While a student at the university Leisegang had also studied German, German literature, and art history (under Paul Stöcklein), and East European History (under Klaus Zernack).

After graduating as a doctor in philosophy from Johann Wolfgang Goethe University, Leisegang obtained a position at Frankfurt University as a lecturer on the History of Philosophy, with particular emphasis on the philosophy of art theory (1971–1973), which he used to work on a philosophical analysis of the works of both Franz Kafka and Karl May. During this time, Leisegang began intensively examining fundamental questions underlying graphic design. This culminated in his Prolegomena on a Theory of Design, which he published in the newspaper Design International in 1971 (whose editors were Leisegang himself, Anton Stankowski, and Horst Heiderhoff). In addition to this, he also toyed with the subject of prime numbers.

Leisegang put his teaching position in Frankfurt on hold in 1972 to take up a position as guest lecturer at the University of the Witwatersrand in Johannesburg (South Africa). Here, alongside a relational theory drafted in English, he began plans for a philosophic political paper on "Apartheid and Integration as Moments of a True Political Relationship between Black and White in South Africa" (Letter to Julius Schaaf on July 20, 1972). Unfortunately, his posit that one-sided political relationships would inevitably lead to foreseeable social and economic catastrophe, which drew from examples from South Africa, never came to fruition in the form of a paper, as his manuscript went missing during a move. However, it was discussed during his lectures. While still in South Africa, Leisegang explicitly withdrew his application for a chair position at J.W. Goethe University and left his lecturer position there to rest (Letter to J. Schaaf, July 20, 1972).

In August 1972 he returned to Germany due to the death of his father. He held the seminar "Philosophical Aspects of Literature, Karl May: Ardistan and Dschinnistan" in the winter semester of 1972/73, which, in a certain sense, came to be his legacy. Despite his successes, Leisegang committed suicide in the early hours of March 21, 1973. Shortly before this, he had written a letter informing the police of his impending suicide.

== Works ==
=== Poetry collections ===
- Bilder der Frühe (Privately Printed), Offenbach am Main 1962.
- Aufbruch der Stille, Prose, Offenbach am Main 1963
- Übung eines Weges (Privateky Printed), Offenbach am Main 1964
- Brüche. Bläschke, Darmstadt 1964
- Überschreitungen. Bläschke, Darmstadt 1965
- Intérieurs. Jolei Holzschnitte. Afterword: Hans Hinterhäuser. Heiderhoff, Frankfurt 1966
- Hoffmann am Fenster. Drawings by Claire-Lise Holy. Afterword: Hans-Jürgen Heise. Heiderhoff, Frankfurt 1968
- Unordentliche Gegend. Aphorisms, Poems, Translations 1960–1970. Eight drawings by Jolei. Heiderhoff, Frankfurt 1971
- Aus privaten Gründen. Gedichte und Aphorismen. Heiderhoff, Frankfurt 1973
- Bei Abwesenheit von Wolken – Aphorismen zur Landschaft. Leisegangs Texts into images by Jolei. Heiderhoff, Echzell 1976
- Lauter letzte Worte. Gedichte und Miniaturen. Published with Afterword from Karl Corino. Suhrkamp, Frankfurt 1980
- Übung eines Weges. Gedichte. Pub. Roswitha Heiderhoff and Karl Corino, Heiderhoff, Eisingen 1986

=== Essays (Theory of Design) ===
- Die Form sichtbar machen, in: Katalog der Frankfurter Sezession, Frankfurt 1963
- Die Welt lesen, in: Horst Heiderhoff, Print and Typography, Mainz 1965
- Aber trenne die Schichten... Reflexionen zu Gedichten von Paul Lüth, in: Deutsches Ärzteblatt 7, 12. February 1966, p. 462–463
- Nachwort, in: Carl Schmachtenberg, Selected poems, Frankfurt [Druck der Horst-Heiderhoff-Presse 2] 1967
- Die Wahl einer Schrift, in: Horst Heiderhoff Typography, Wiesbaden 1967
- Was ist Grafik-Design und was kann es leisten?/What means Graphic-Design and what can it perform?, in: design international 2/[19]70, p. 8–17
- Prolegomena zu einer Theorie der Gestaltung I: Einleitung, in: design international 4/[19]70 [?], p. 6–7
- Prolegomena zu einer Theorie der Gestaltung II: Gestaltung und Information/Prolegomena to a Theory of Designing II: Designing and Information, in: design international 1/[19]71 I, p. 54–60 [a slightly longer version entitled Gestalt – Information – Kunst, in: Druck-Print, 1/1971, S. 13–16; both versions stem from the same 26-page typoscript from Dieter Leisegang in the German Literature Archive Marbach; however, they vary respectively on the level of undergone revision]
- Aggression als Heilslehre, in: Der Literat, Issue 12, Frankfurt 1970
- Heinrich Wehmeiers didaktische Typographie, in: Der Polygraph, Supplement to Issue 20-[19]71
- Lücken im Publikum. Relatives und Absolutes bei Franz Kafka. In: Philosophie als Beziehungswissenschaft. Festschrift for Julius Schaaf. Heiderhoff, Frankfurt 1974, p. XVI/ 3–56

=== Philosophical works ===
- Die drei Potenzen der Relation. Heiderhoff, Frankfurt 1969
- Dimension und Totalität. „Entwurf einer Philosophie der Beziehung“. Heiderhoff, Frankfurt 1972
- Philosophie als Beziehungswissenschaft. Festschrift for Julius Schaaf (Pub. with Wilhelm Friedrich Niebel). Heiderhoff, Frankfurt 1974

=== Mathematics ===
- Vorbereitende Ausführungen zum Thema: Primzahlentabellen im Zahlbereich über 10 hoch sieben, Typoscript o. J., 16 p. (Nachlass Dieter Leisegang, Deutsches Literaturarchiv Marbach)

=== Film and Radio Features ===
- Ein Fenster zur Welt, Gedichte von zehn slowenischen Autoren, Süddeutscher Rundfunk, 5. September 1968
- Erich Martin, Porträt eines Malers, Hessisches Fernsehen, 8. July 1969
- Dichter über ihre Dichtungen, Hessisches Fernsehen, 8. July 1969
- Die Pariser Biennale für junge Kunst, Hessisches Fernsehen, 22. October 1969
- Ich schreibe … Resignation und Tendenz in der deutschen Lyrik nach Auschwitz, Hessisches Fernsehen, 11. November 1969
- Die Gießener Musiktage 1969, ARD, 23. November 1969
- Aus dem Nachlaß der sechziger Jahre, ARD, 1. January 1970
- Kunst und Kitsch im Kinderbuch, Hessisches Fernsehen, 23. February 1970
- Die Kinderbuchmesse in Bologna, ARD, 25. April 1970

=== Broadcasts ===
- W. H. Auden, The Common Life, Darmstadt 1964
- W. H. Auden, The Cave of Making, Darmstadt 1965
- Hart Crane, Moment Fugue, Darmstadt: J. G. Bläschke Verlag (1966)
- Edvard Kocbek, Die Dialektik, Frankfurt 1968

=== Unfinished works ===
- Gestaltung und Information [= Prolegomena zu einer Theorie der Gestaltung II], Typoscript, undated, 27 p. Din a 4
- Arbeitsexemplar Die drei Potenzen der Relation, with personal comments and supplements
- Lyrik und Computer, handwritten Ms., undated, 3 p. Din a 4
- Selbst-Rezension „Unordentliche Gegend", Typoskript, dat. 1971, 3. p. Din a 4
- Fragment: Ausgehend von einem alltäglichen Sachverhalt … [wohl 1. Disposition for Die drei Potenzen der Relation], undated, handwritten Ms., 2 p. Din a 4
- Dimension und Relation (Anhang zu Die drei Potenzen der Relation), handwritten Ms., dat. 26. January 1969, 3 p. Din a 5
- Vorwort zu Dimension und Totalität, handwritten on 2 envelopes, stamps 18. January72
- Fragment: Ästhetik, handschr. Ms., undated, 2 p. Din a 5
- Fragment: Das Ende der Einsamkeit, handwritten Ms., bez. „Dieter – Bärbel diktiert“, 4 p. Din a 4 mit „Inhaltsverzeichnis“ [„1. Das Ende der Einsamkeit, 2. Die Zerstörung der Kunst, 3. Alleinsein oder die uniformierte Gesellschaft“], undat.
- Typoskript from Dimension und Totalität, with personal revisions
- Rede zum 60. Geburtstag J. Schaafs Okt. 70, Typoskript, 4. p. Din a 4
- Letters from W. H. Auden to Leisegang

== Literature ==
- Julius Schaaf, Beziehung und Idee. Eine platonische Besinnung, in: Parusia. Studien zur Philosophie Platons und zur Problemgeschichte des Platonismus, Pub. K. Flasch, Frankfurt 1965, p. 3–20.
- Julius Schaaf, Statt eines Nachwortes. Rede zur Trauerfeier am 27. März, in: Leisegang, Aus privaten Gründen, Frankfurt 1973.
- Jörg Engelmann, Gesellschaft als Beziehung. Aspekte einer relationstheoretischen Soziologie des Denkens, Frankfurt 1974.
- Reiner Kunze, Rezension von Unordentliche Gegend und Aus privaten Gründen, in: [Source?] 1976 [quoted in: Corino, Das rettungslose Ich, p. 199–200].
- Karl Corino, Das rettungslose Ich. Zur Lyrik Dieter Leisegangs, in: Leisegang, Lauter letzte Worte, p. 199–213.
- Christoph von Wolzogen, Das Skandalon des Ich. Anmerkungen zur Lyrik Dieter Leisegangs, Review by: Leisegang, Lauter letzte Worte, in: Neue Zürcher Zeitung, Feuilleton, 18. September 1980, p. 37–38.
- Hans Dieter Schäfer, Dieter Leisegang, in: Die deutsche Lyrik 1945–1975, Düsseldorf 1981.
- Christoph von Wolzogen, Die autonome Relation. Zum Problem der Beziehung im Spätwerk von Paul Natorp. Ein Beitrag zur Geschichte der Theorien der Relation, Würzburg/Amsterdam 1984.
- Rüdiger Bolz (1985). "Leisegang, Dieter". Neue Deutsche Biographie (in German). Vol. 14. Berlin: Duncker & Humblot. p. 154. (full text online).
- Harald Hartung, Das leergelebte Leben, in: Frankfurter Anthologie 9, Frankfurt 1985.
- Christoph von Wolzogen, Artikel Relation IV – 20. Jahrhundert, in: Historisches Wörterbuch der Philosophie, Bd. 8, Basel 1992, p. 602–606.
- Petra Ernst, Dieter Leisegang, in: Lexikon der deutschsprachigen Gegenwartsliteratur, 2 Bde., pub. Thomas Kraft, München 2002.
- Paul Drechsel, on the „Logik der Globalisierung“, Kap. 2, Exkurs: Die Logik der Relation aRb as synopsis of separating and connecting, www.drechsel-science.de/Globalisierungs-Vortrag/Buch-Kapitel-2.pdf [vgl. full manuscript: www.drechsel-science.de/webseiten/globalisierung.htm].
