= Eugen Geinitz =

German geologist and mineralogist

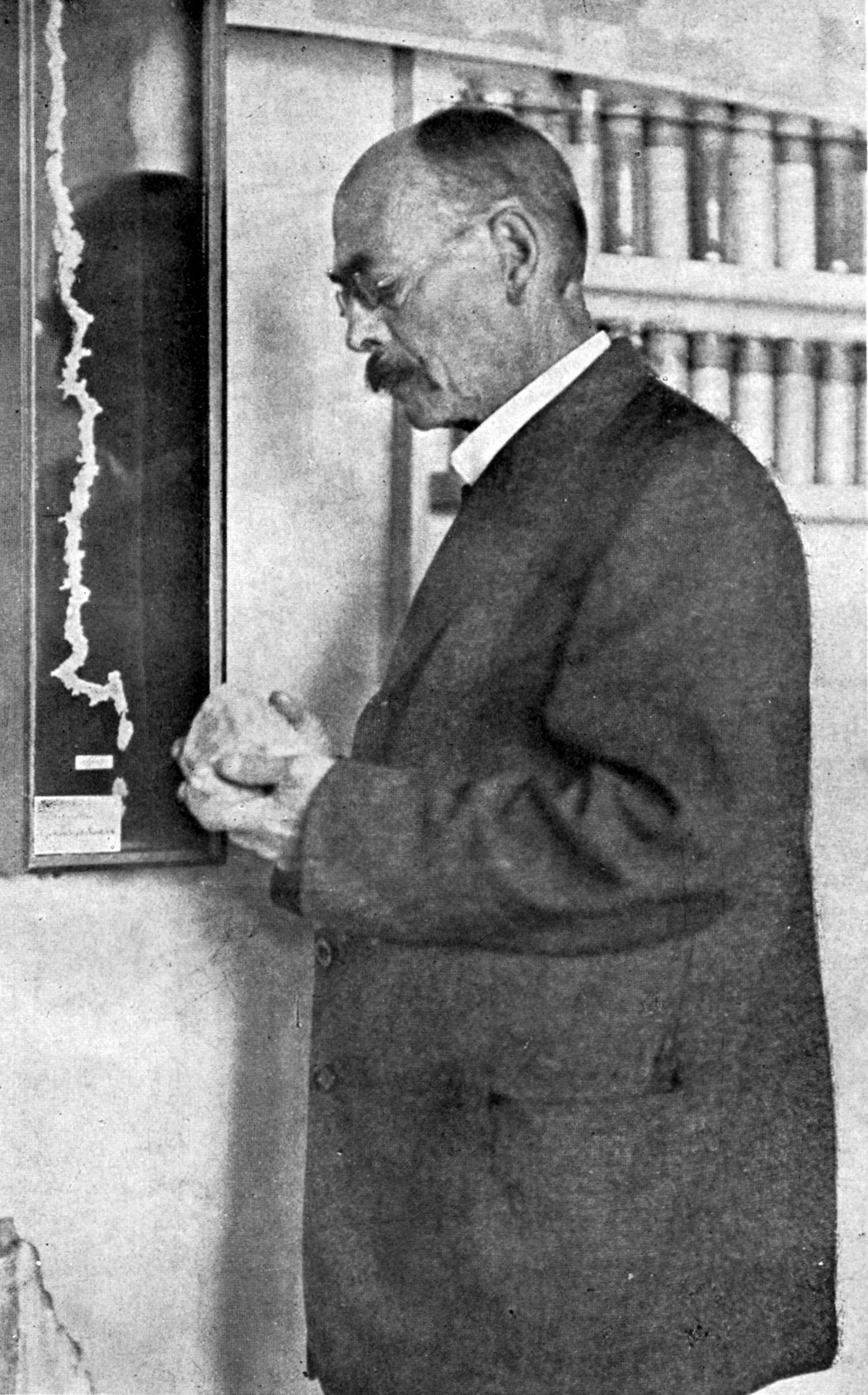
Eugen Geinitz

Franz Eugen Geinitz (15 February 1854, Dresden – 9 March 1925, Rostock) was a German geologist and mineralogist best known for his geological studies of the Mecklenburg region. He was the son of geologist Hanns Bruno Geinitz.

== Biography ==
In 1876 he obtained his PhD from the University of Leipzig with a dissertation on mineral pseudomorphs. During the following year he received his habilitation from the University of Göttingen, and shortly afterwards, became an associate professor of geology and mineralogy at the University of Rostock. In 1881 he became a full professor and director of the mineralogical-geological institute at Rostock. In 1903/04 he served as university rector.

In 1882 he was named head of the Mecklenburg Geological Landesmuseum. In 1905 he was co-founder of the Mecklenburg Heimatbund.

== Selected works ==
- Das Erdbeben von Iquique am 9. Mai 1877 und die durch dasselbe verursachte Erdbebenfluth im Grossen Ocean, 1878 – Paper on the 1877 Iquique earthquake, about which, Geinitz conducted an analysis of ocean waves taken from data collected at various faraway locations in the Pacific (Hawaiian Islands, New Zealand, Japan, etc.). From this data he was able to calculate the mean velocity of the ocean waves and make a determination of the corresponding mean depths of the Pacific Ocean along the routes taken by the waves.
- Die skandinavischen Plagioklasgesteine und Phonolith aus dem mecklenburgischen Diluvium, 1882 – The Scandinavian plagioclase rocks and phonolites of the Mecklenburg Diluvium.
- Geologischer Führer durch Mecklenburg. Mit einer Übersichtskarte und 15 Tafeln, 1899 – Geological guide for Mecklenburg.
- Das Quartär von Nordeuropa. Die Flora und Fauna des Quartärs, 1904 – The Northern European Quaternary, the flora and fauna of the Quaternary.
- Landeskunde von Mecklenburg, 1907 – Regional studies of Mecklenburg.
- Die Eiszeit, 1906 – The Ice Age.
- Das Diluvium Deutschlands; 1920 – The German Diluvium.
- Geologie Mecklenburgs, mit geologischer Übersichtskarte von Mecklenburg, 1922 – Geology of Mecklenburg, with geological overview charts.
