= Julie Clodius =

German philosopher (1750–1805)

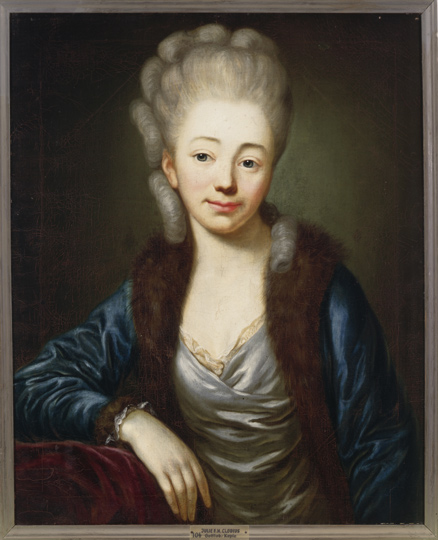
Julie Friederike Henriette Clodius by Ernst Gottlob, c.1785

Julie Clodius (Juliane Friederike Henriette Clodius, née Stoelzel) was a German philosopher. She was born August 20, 1750, in Aptenburg, Holy Roman Empire and died on March 3, 1805, in Dresden.

== Works ==
Clodius wrote several articles in various periodicals.

- 1784: Poems by Elisa Carter and Charlotte Smith (translation)
- 1784: Biographical epilogue in: Christian August Clodius - New mixed writings (5th part)
- 1806: Eduard Montrefrevil (novel, posthumously, edited together with fragments from your papers by Christian August Heinrich Clodius)

== Sources ==
- Brown, Hilary. “The Reception of the Bluestockings by Eighteenth-Century German Women Writers.” Women in German Yearbook, vol. 18, 2002, pp. 111–132. JSTOR, www.jstor.org/stable/20688944. Accessed 25 May 2021.
- https://historyofwomenphilosophers.org/project/directory-of-women-philosophers/clodius-juliane-friederike-henriette-1750-1805/
- https://link.springer.com/chapter/10.1007/978-3-476-03647-6_9
- https://www.jstor.org/stable/41124358
- https://books.google.com/books?id=9aFjAAAAcAAJ&dq=Julie+Clodius&pg=PA1
