= Karl Georg Gustav Wüstnei =

German naturalist of the Mecklenburg region (1810–1858)

Karl Georg Gustav Wüstnei (18 February 1810 – 12 October 1858) was a German theologian, naturalist and school teacher. He collected numerous specimens of fungi, plants and insects from the Mecklenburg region. He is commemorated in the fungus genus Wuestneia.

Wüstnei was born in Malchin where his father was a physician. He studied theology at Rostock from 1830 but went on to study mathematics and botany under Hermann Karsten and Heinrich Gustav Flörke. He became a teacher of mathematics and natural science at Schwerin from 1835. He collected plants from the Mecklenburg region and also exchanged specimens from other parts of the world with collectors. He took a special interest in the moss and lichens and edited two exsiccatae, namely Musci hepatici exsiccati Florae Megapolitanae and Sammlung mecklenburgischer Lebermoose. He took a minor interest in birds but his son Carl Wüstnei became a specialist on the birds of the Mecklenburg region. He collaborated with Carl Fiedler, Hans Brockmüller and others.

Species named after him include the fungus genus Wuestneia, the bee Anthidium wuestneii, and the sawfly Brachythops wuestneii.

The standard author abbreviation Wüstnei is used to indicate this person as the author when citing a botanical name.
