= Hanns Bruno Geinitz =

German geologist (1814–1900)

Hanns Bruno Geinitz (16 October 1814 – 28 January 1900) was a German geologist, born at Altenburg, the capital of Saxe-Altenburg.

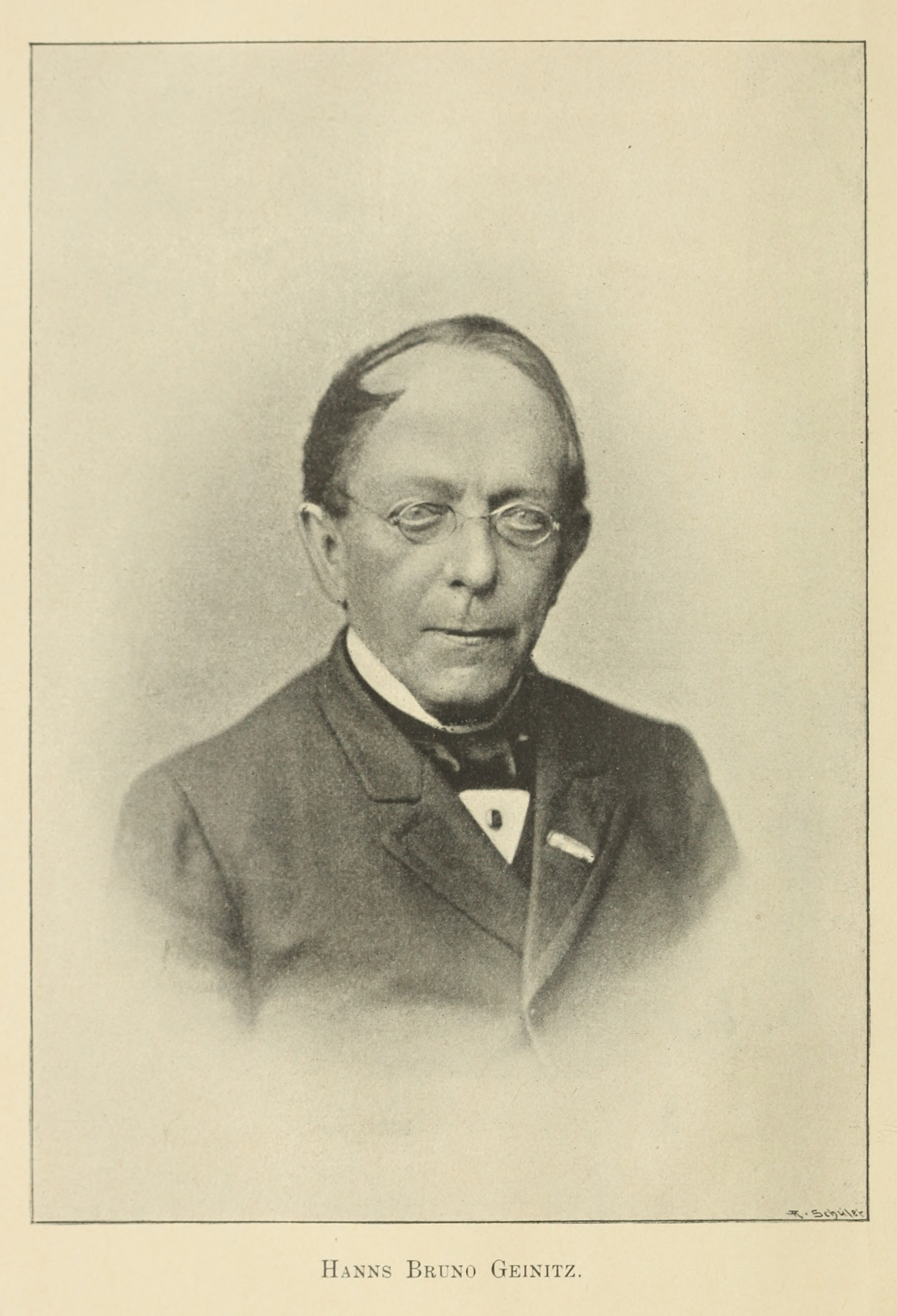
Hanns Bruno Geinitz

== Life ==
He was educated at the universities of Berlin and Jena, and gained the foundations of his geological knowledge under Friedrich August von Quenstedt. In 1837 he took the degree of Ph.D. with a thesis on the Muschelkalk of Thuringia. In 1850 he became professor of geology and mineralogy in the Royal Polytechnic School at Dresden, and in 1857 he was made director of the Royal Mineralogical and Geological Museum; he held these posts until 1894.

He was distinguished for his researches on the Carboniferous and Cretaceous rocks and fossils of Saxony, and in particular for those relating to the fauna and flora of the Permian or, at that time, 'Dyas' formation. He described also the graptolites of the local Silurian strata; and the flora of the coal-formation of the Altay Mountains and of Nebraska.

From 1863 to 1878 he was one of the editors of the Neues Jahrbuch. He was awarded the Murchison Medal by the Geological Society of London in 1878. He died at Dresden. His son Franz Eugen Geinitz (1854–1925), professor of geology in the university of Rostock, became distinguished for researches on the geology of Saxony, Mecklenburg, and other places.

H. B. Geinitz's publications include:

- Das Quadersandsteingebirge oder Kreidegebirge in Deutschland (1849–1850).
- Die Versteinerungen der Steinkohlenformation in Sachsen (1855).
- Dyas oder die Zechsteinformation und das Rothliegende (1861–1862).
- Das Elbthalgebirge in Sachsen. Palaeontographica (1871–1875).
