= List of Dominicans proposed for canonization =

Dominicans on canonization process

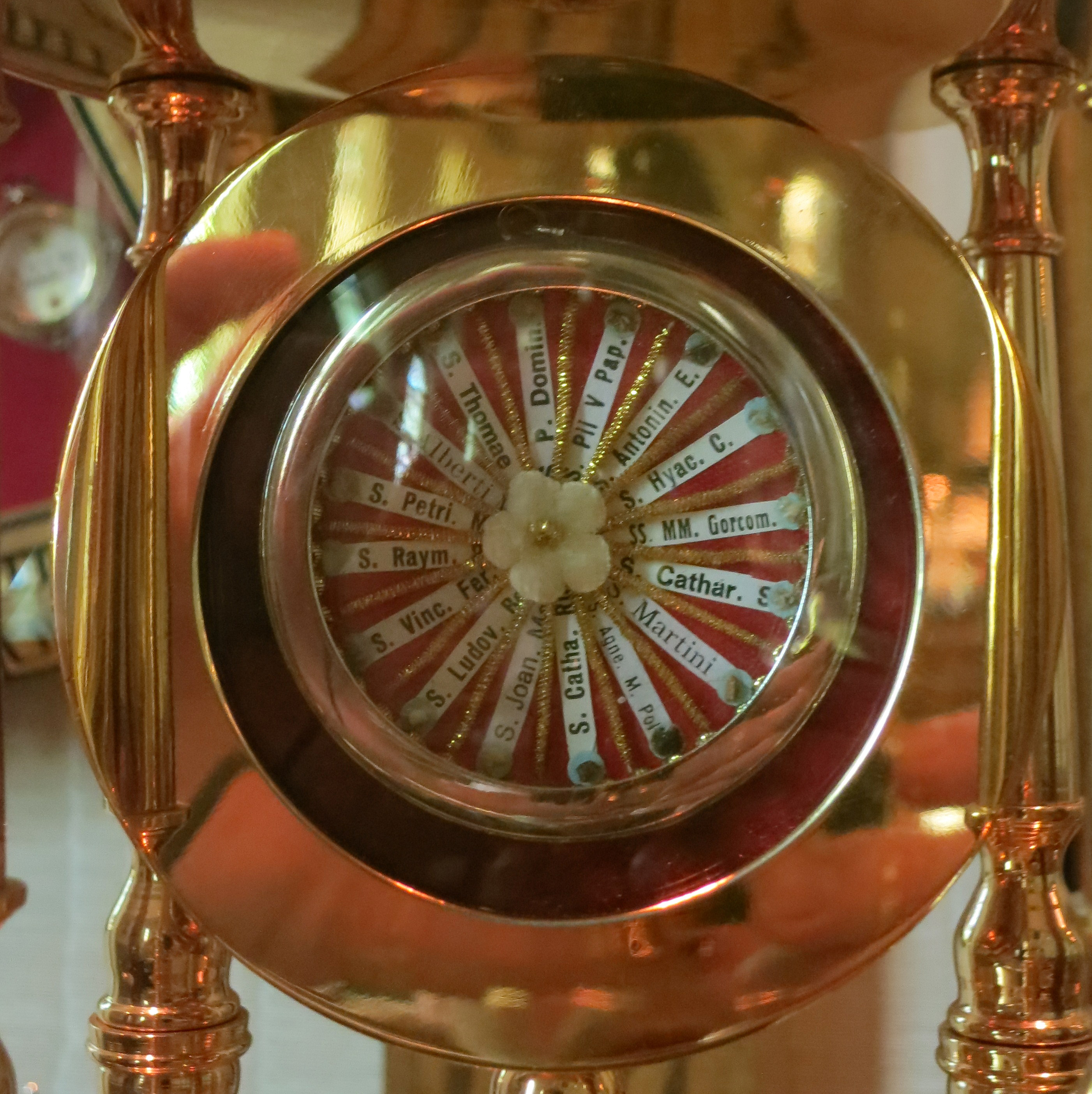
Relics of Dominican saints

The Order of Preachers was founded by St. Dominic de Guzman, a Spanish friar, in 1215 to proclaim the word of God by preaching, teaching and example, while they are sustained by life in common. Through the synthesis of the contemplative life and the active ministry, numerous members and affiliates of the Order have attained heroic virtues and were recognized for their holiness being canonized and are currently on beatification process thereafter.

The following is an exhaustive list of Dominican members, affiliates and those who embraced the Dominican spirituality who are now recognized as saints, blesseds, venerables and servants of God in the Catholic Church. It also includes those who are considered probable candidates for sainthood. As of 1970, three members have been recognized as Doctors of the Church.

== Doctors of the Church ==
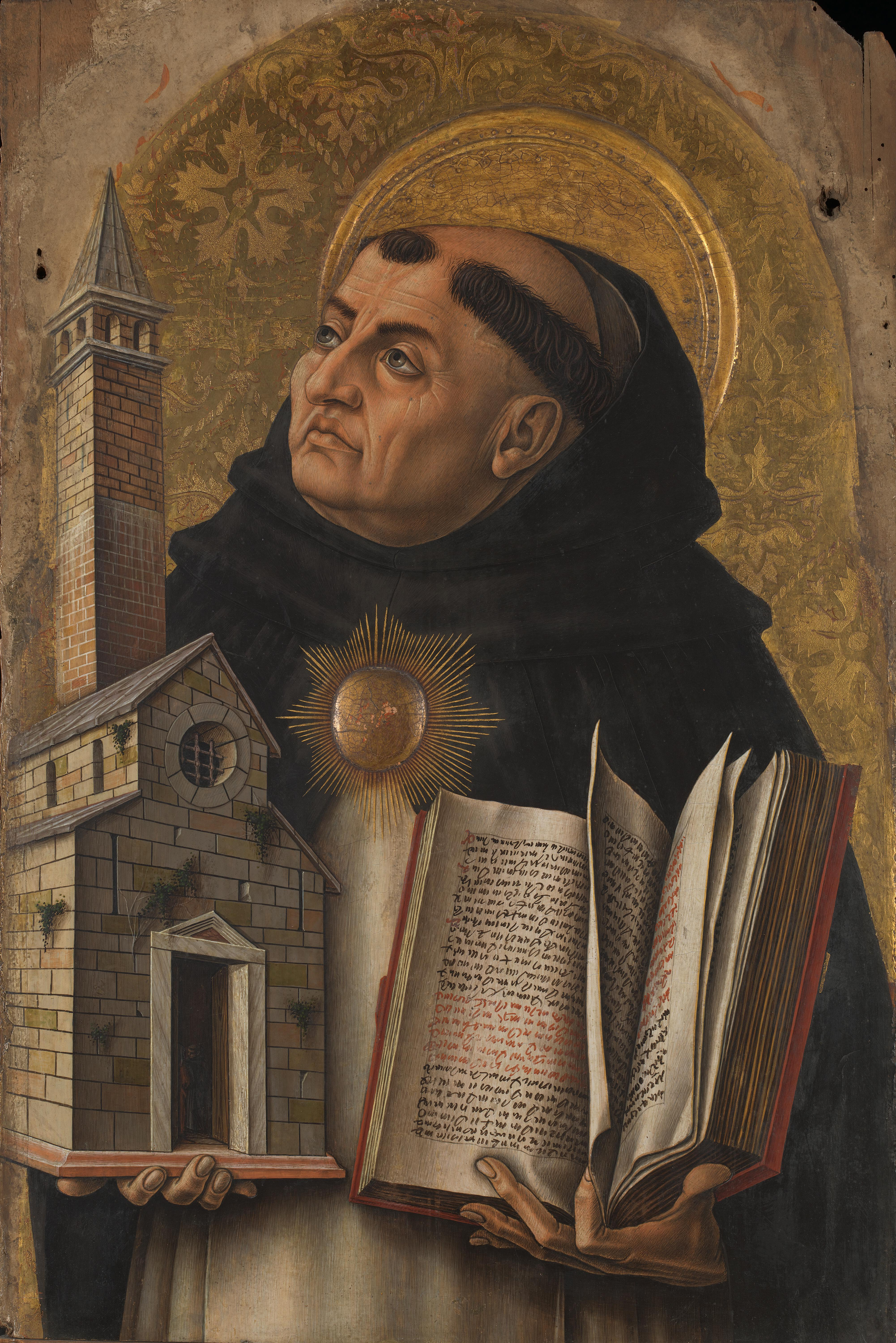
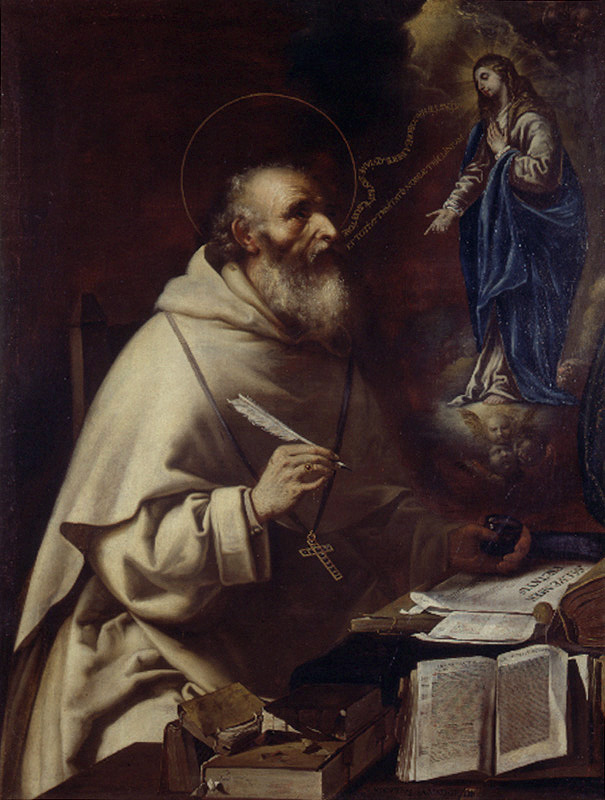
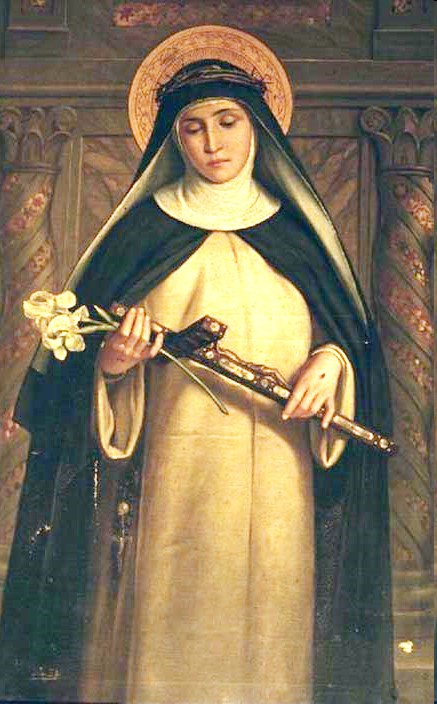
The Three Dominican Doctors of the Church.
- Tommaso d'Aquino (1225–1274), Professed Priest of the Dominicans (Italy)
  - Canonized: 18 July 1323 by Pope John XXII
  - Declared "Doctor of the Church": 11 April 1567 by Pope Pius V
- Albertus Magnus (c. 1200–1280), Professed Priest of the Dominicans; Bishop of Regensburg (Germany)
  - Beatified: 1622 by Pope Gregory XV
  - Canonized: 16 December 1931 by Pope Pius XI
  - Declared "Doctor of the Church": 16 December 1931 by Pope Pius XI
- Caterina Benincasa (1347–1380), Layperson of the Archdiocese of Siena; Member of the Lay Dominicans (Italy)
  - Beatified: 29 December 1460 by Pope Pius II
  - Canonized: 29 June 1461 by Pope Pius II
  - Declared "Doctor of the Church": 3 October 1970 by Pope Paul VI

== Saints ==
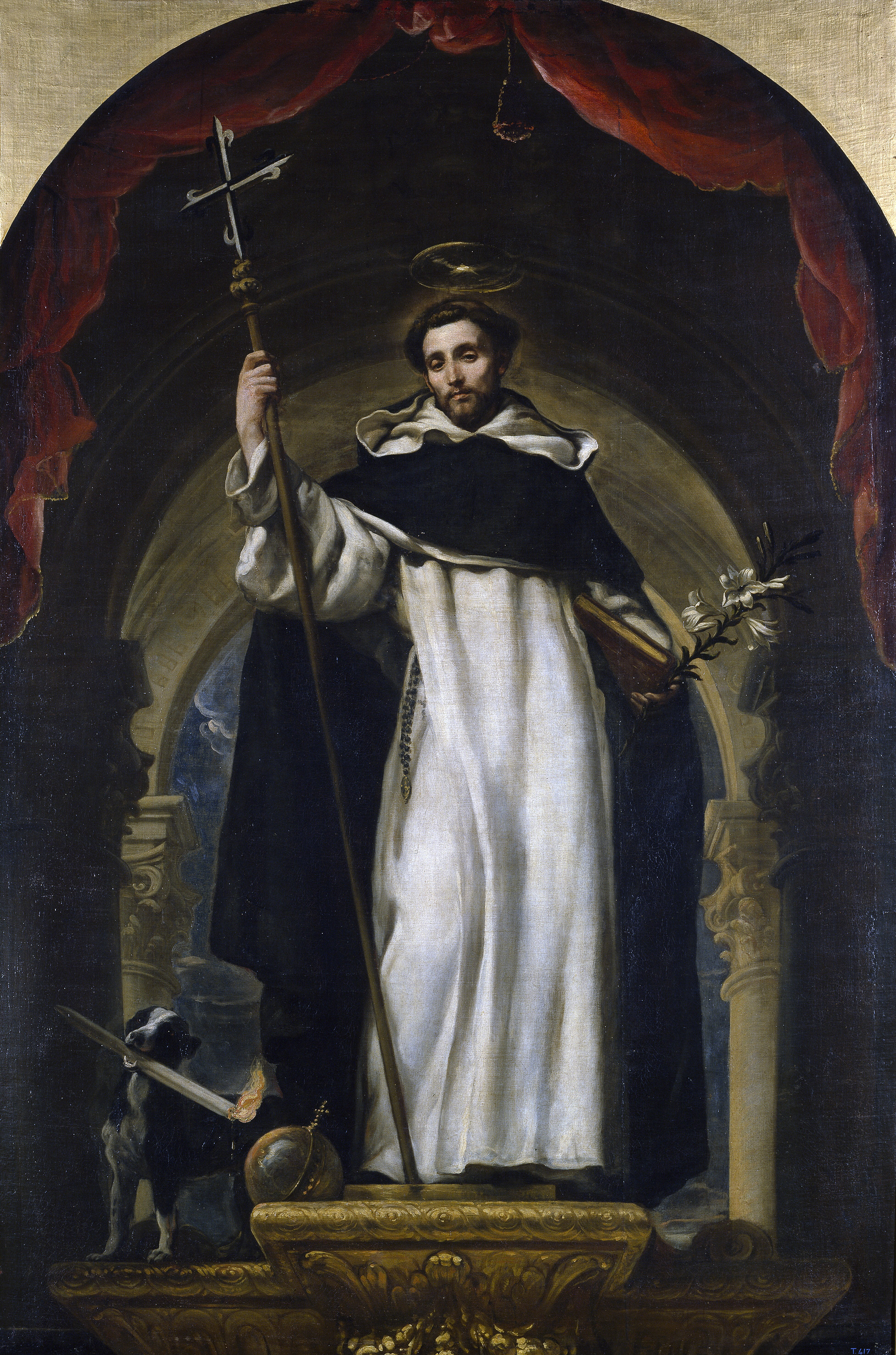
St. Domingo Félix de Guzmán

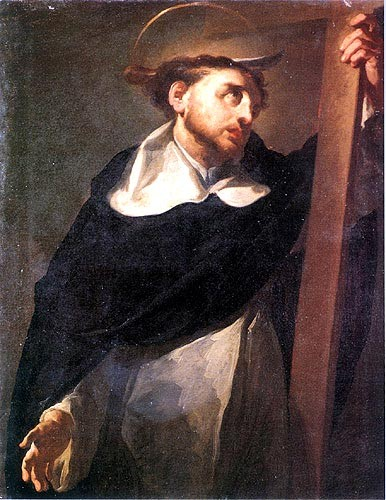
St. Pietro di Verona

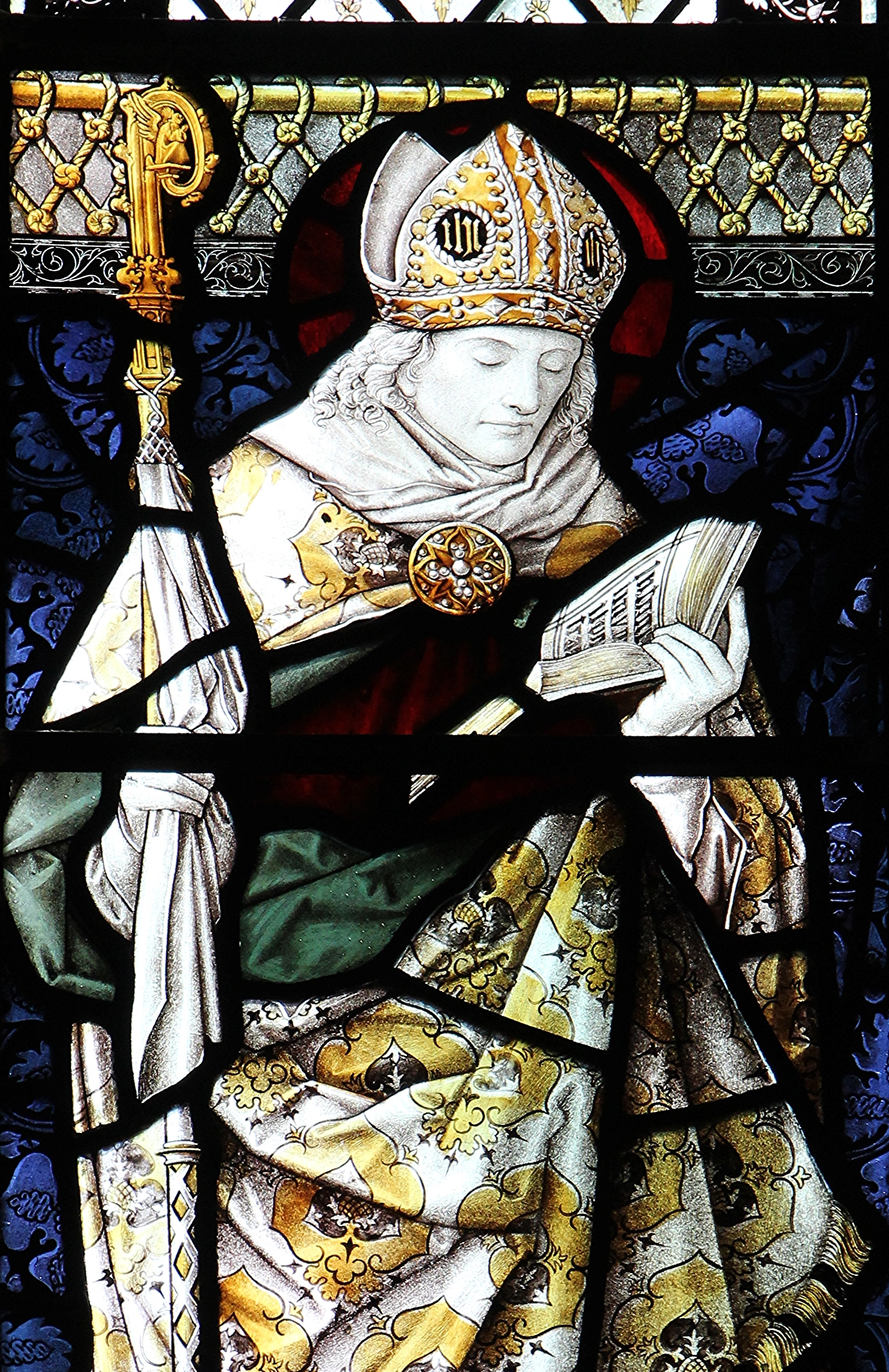
St. Richard de Wych

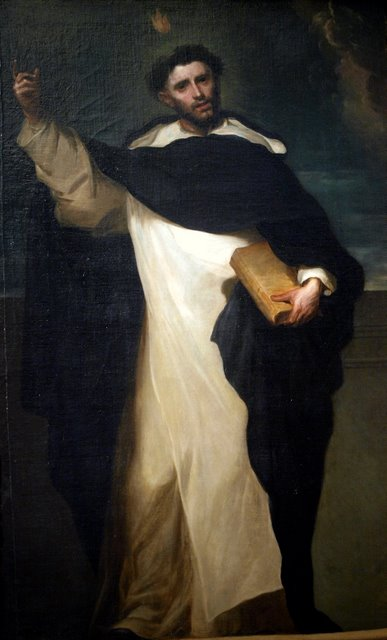
St. Vicente Ferrer Miquel

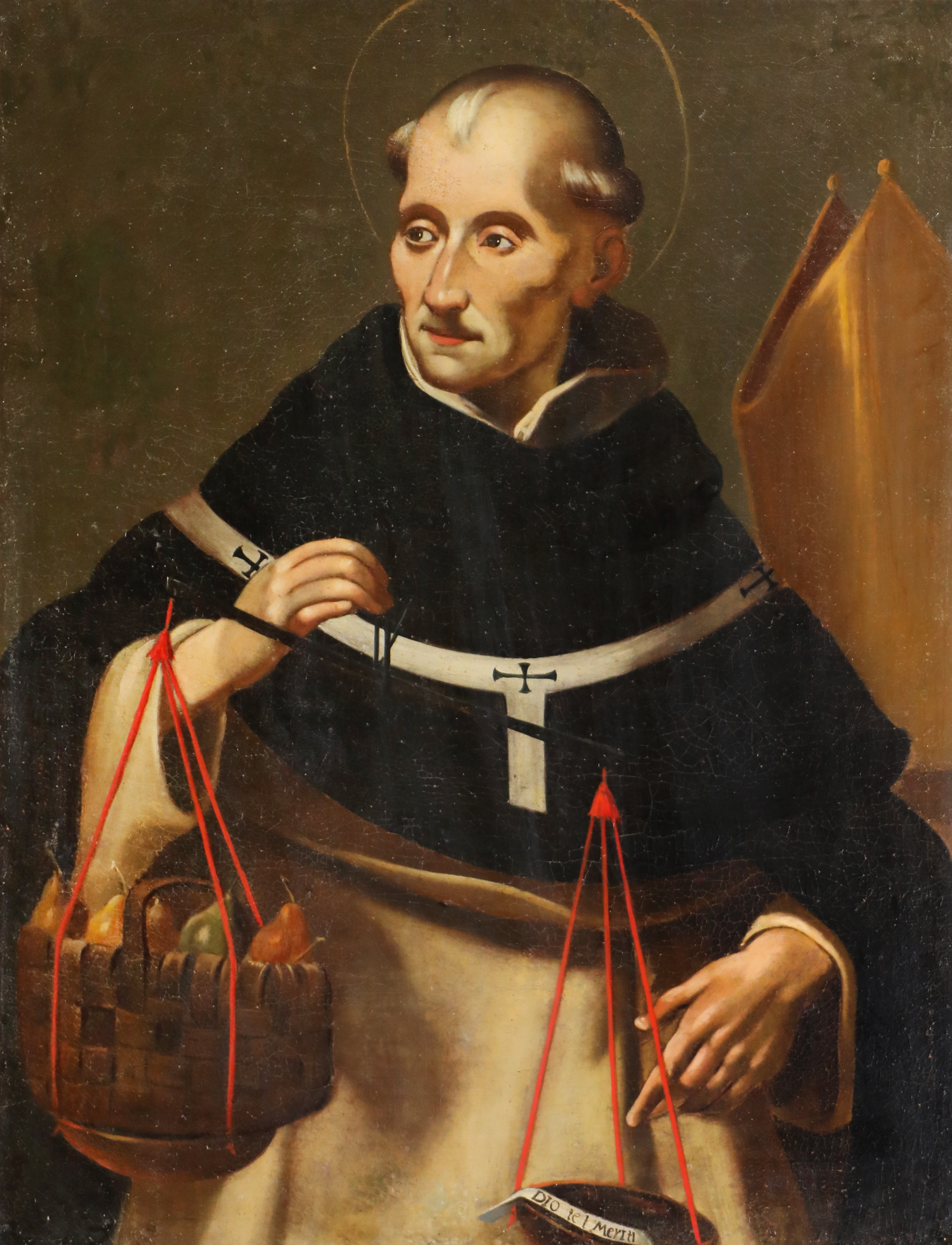
St. Antonio Pierozzi

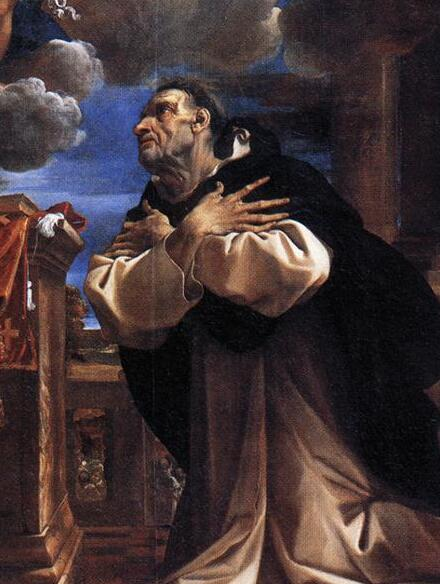
St. Jacek Odrowąż

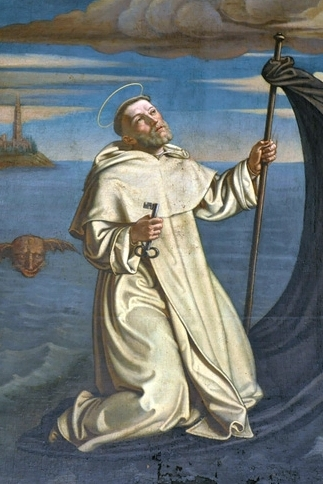
St. Raimundo de Peñafort

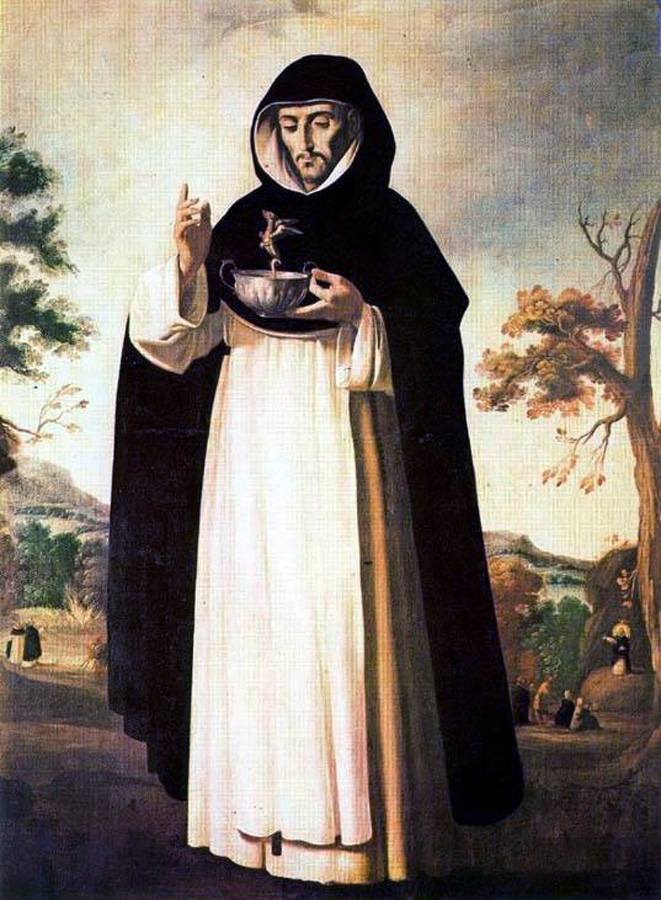
St. Louis Bertrán Eixarch

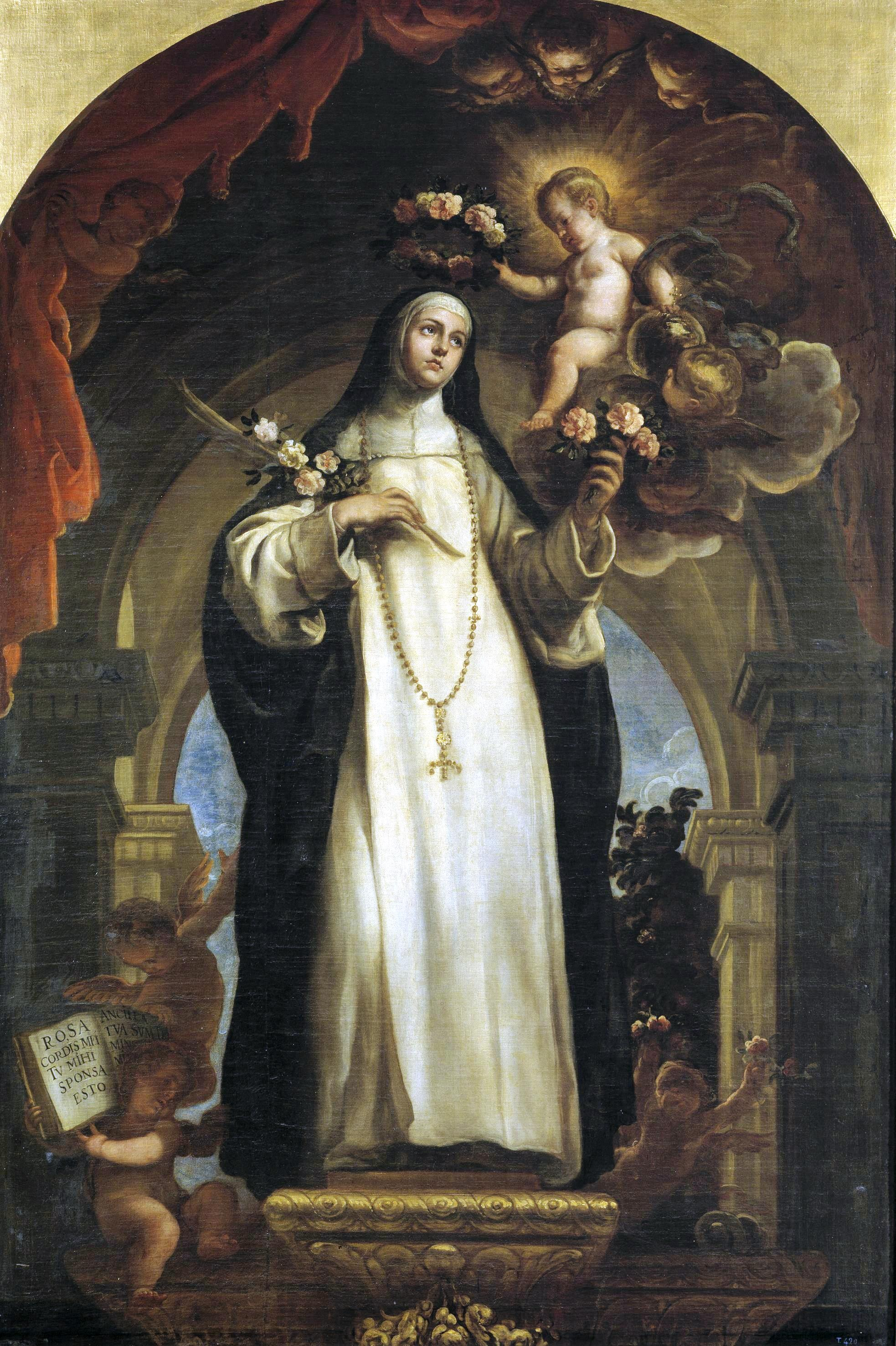
St. Rosa Flores de Oliva

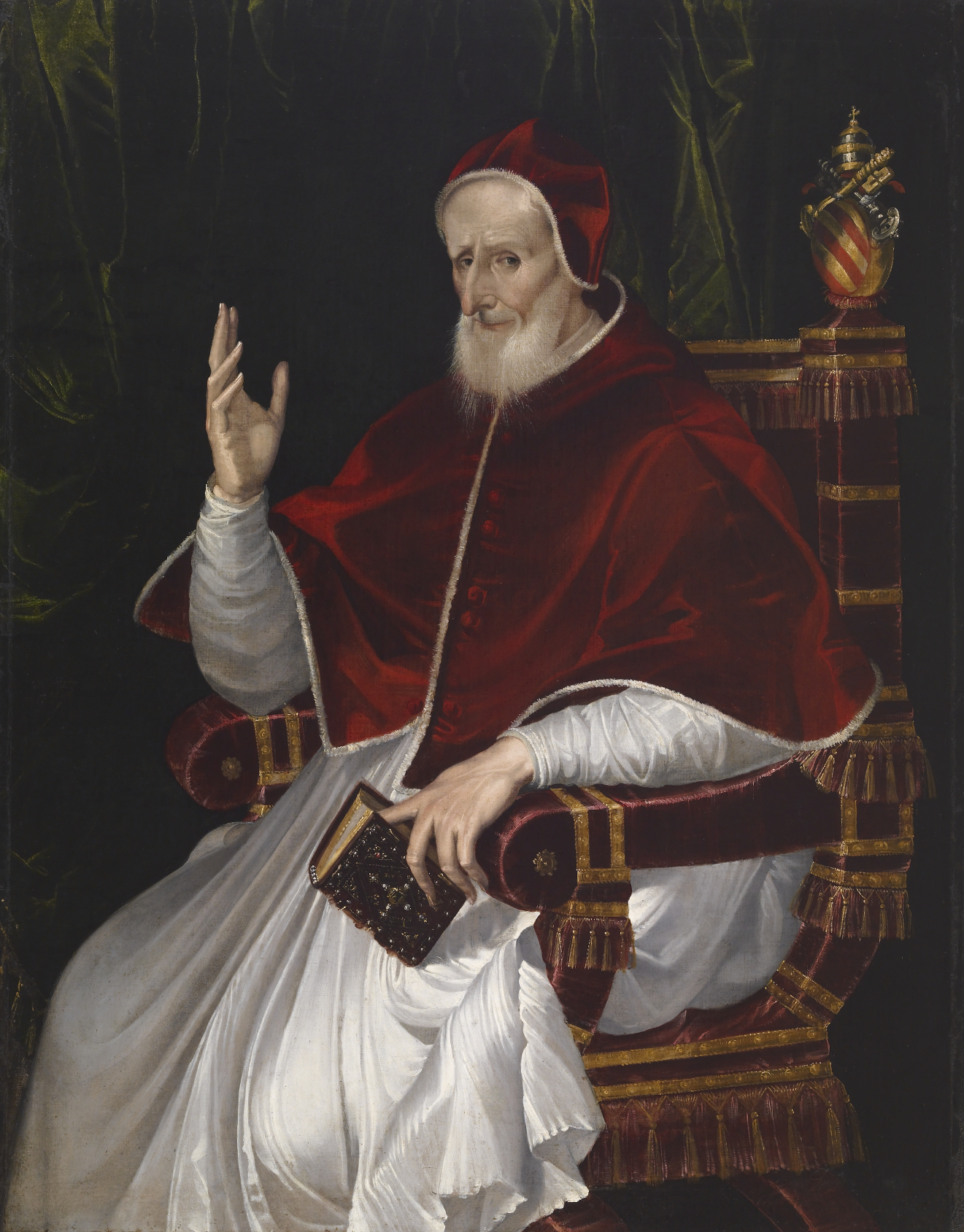
St. Pope Pius V

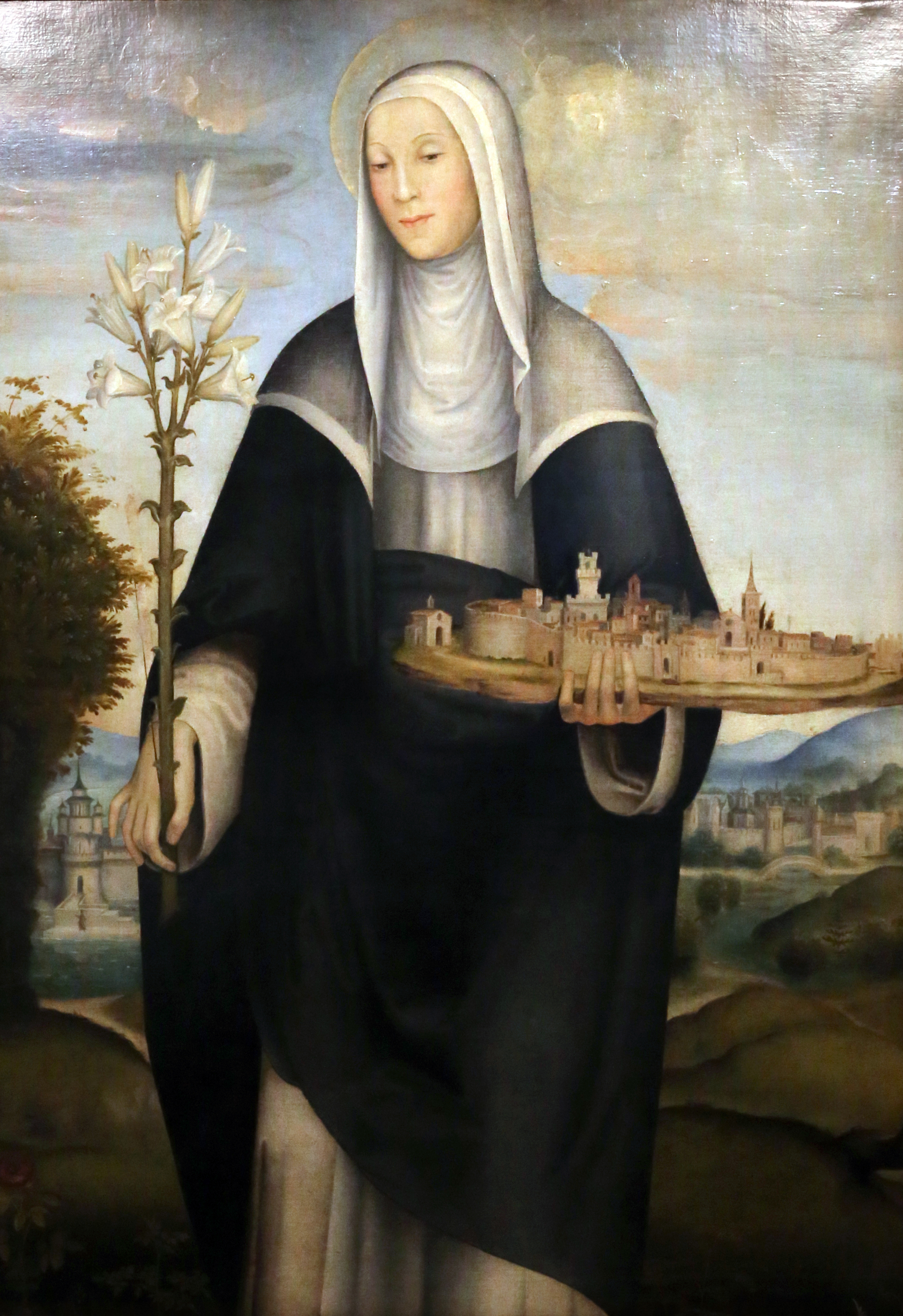
St Agnese Segni

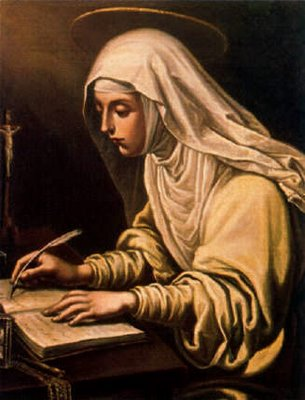
St. Caterina de' Ricci

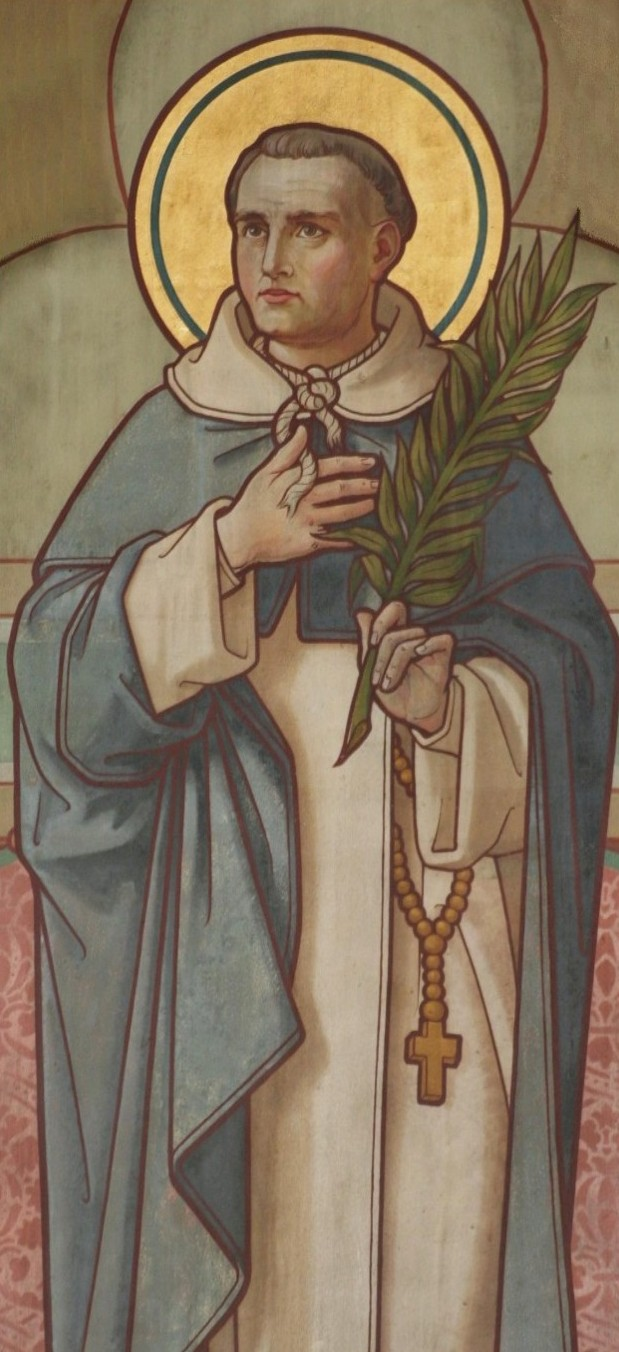
St. Johannes von Hoornaar

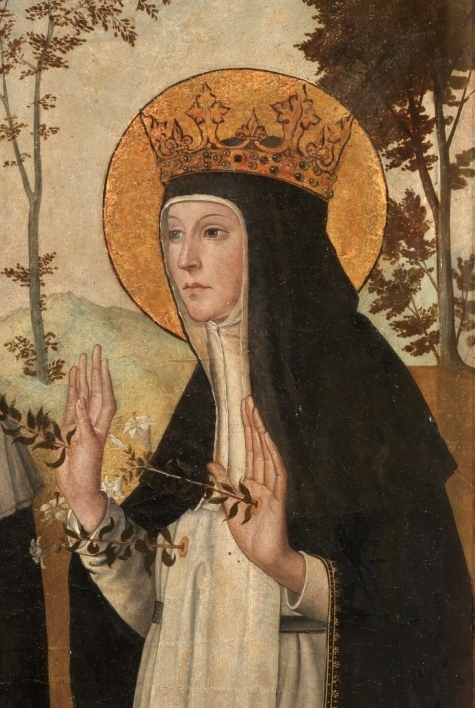
St. Margit of Hungary

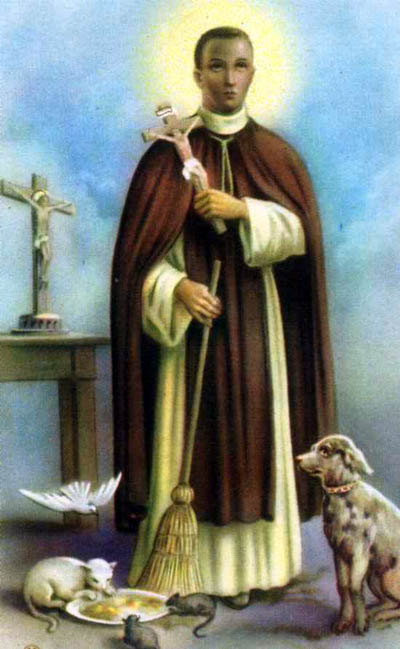
St. Martín de Porres Velázquez

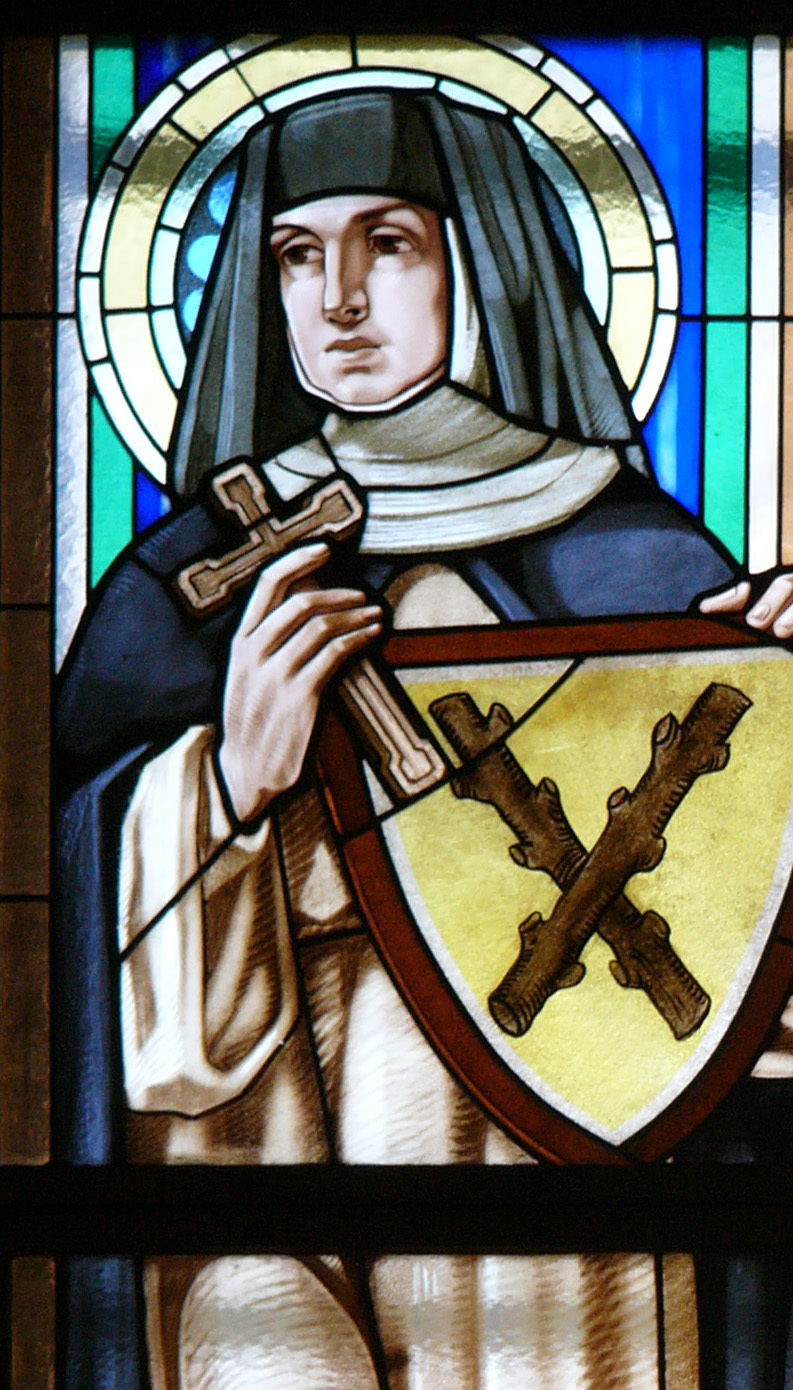
St. Zdislava Berka

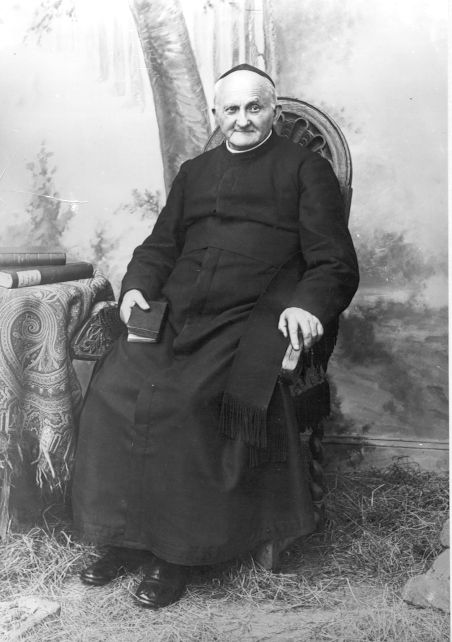
St. Arnold Janssen

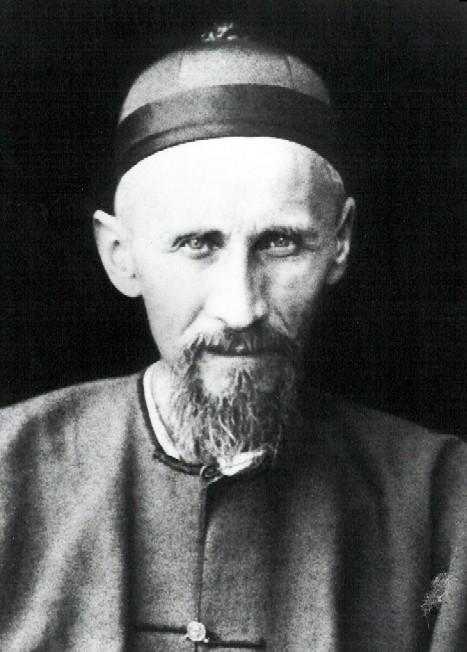
St. Josef Freinademetz

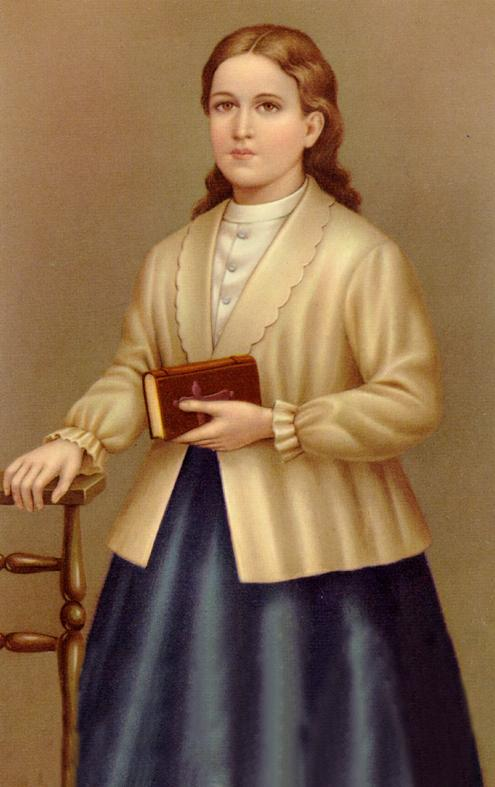
St. Narcisa de Jesús Martillo Morán

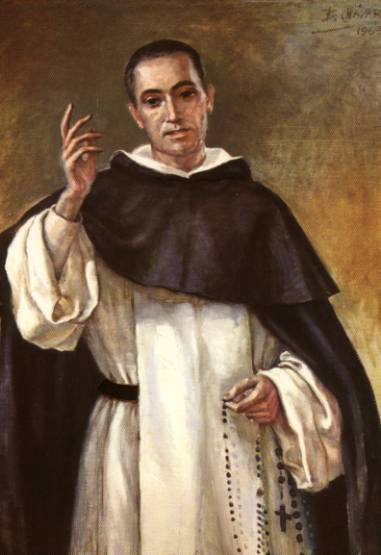
St. Francisco Coll Guitart

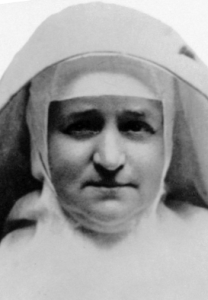
St. María del Carmen Sallés Barangueras

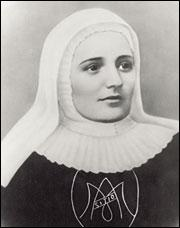
St. Laura Montoya Upegui

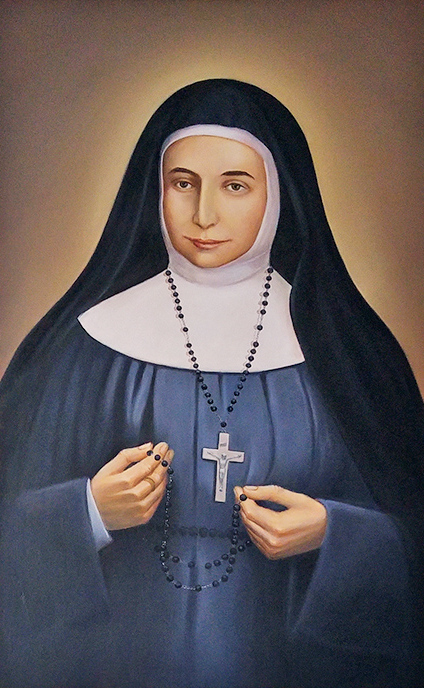
St. Marie-Alphonsine Danil Ghattas

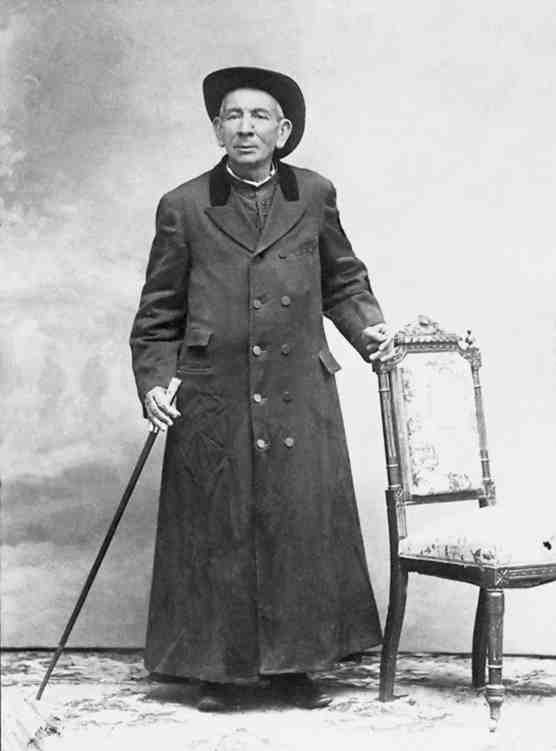
St. José Gabriel del Rosario Brochero

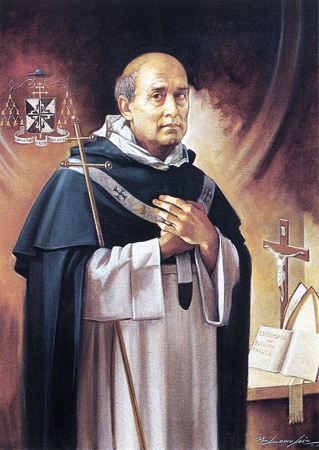
St. Bartolomeu dos Martires

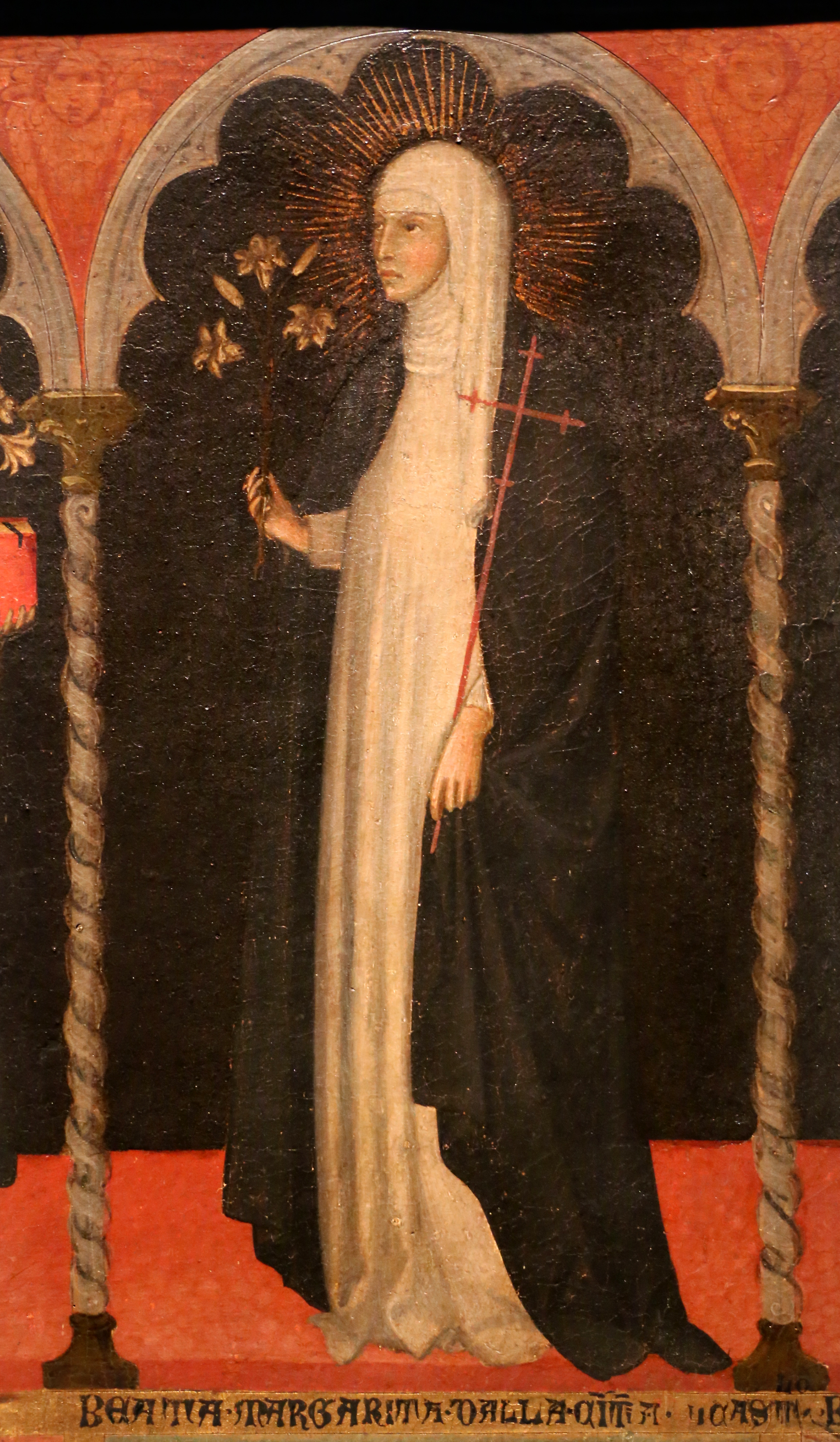
St. Margherita of Castello

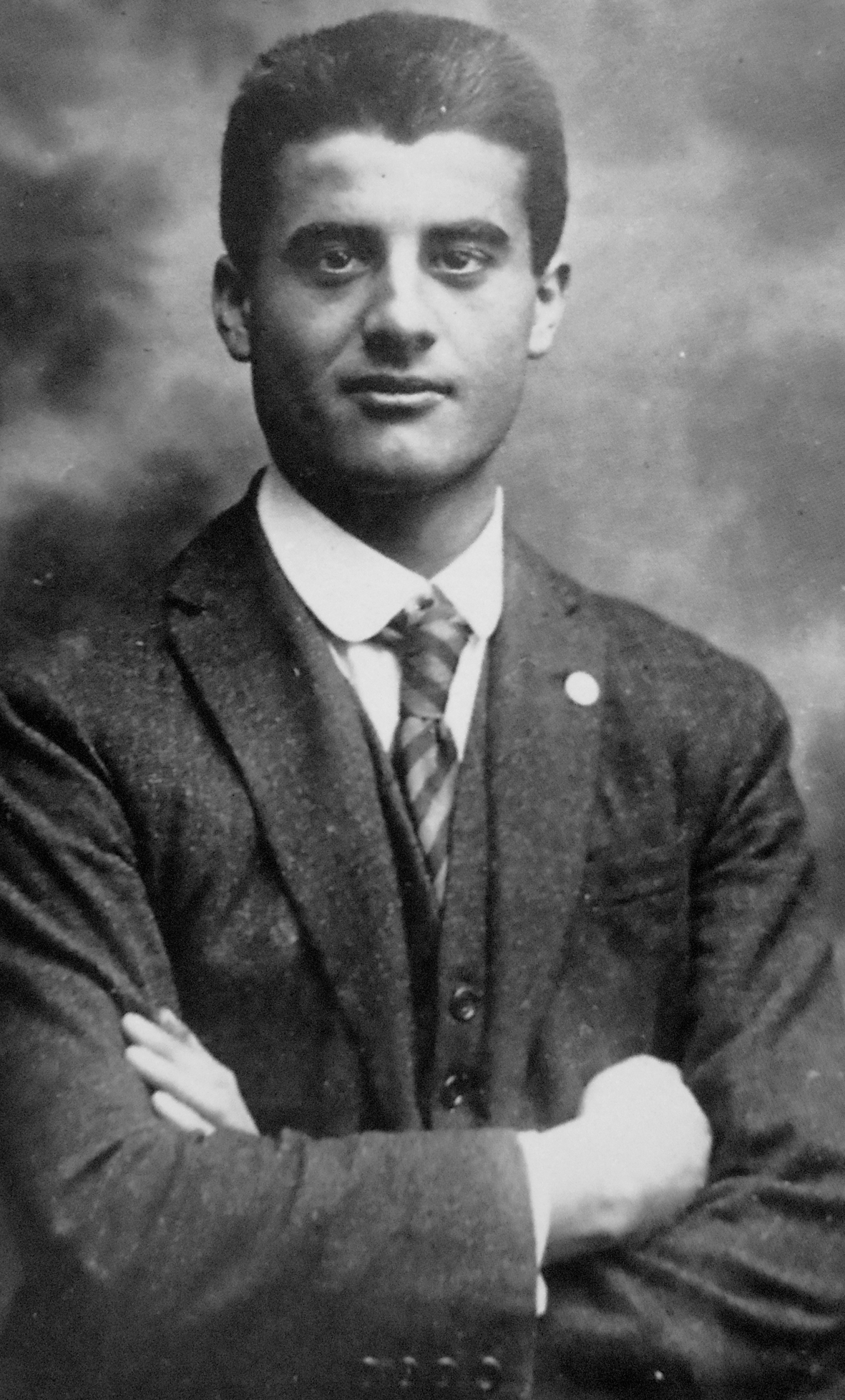
St. Pier Giorgio Frassati

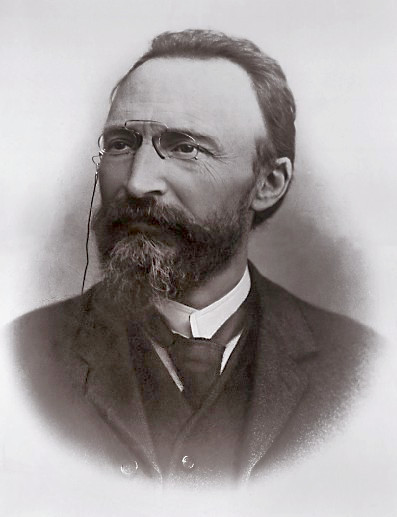
Bartolo Longo
- Domingo Félix de Guzmán (1170–1221), Founder of the Order of Preachers (Dominicans) (Spain–Italy)
  - Canonized: 13 July 1234 by Pope Gregory IX
- Pietro Martire da Verona (1205–1252), Professed Priest of the Dominicans; Martyr in odium fidei (Italy)
  - Canonized: 9 March 1253 by Pope Innocent IV
- Richard de Wych (c. 1197–1253), Bishop of Chichester (United Kingdom)
  - Canonized: 25 January 1262 by Pope Urban IV
- Vicente Ferrer Miquel (1350–1419), Professed Priest of the Dominicans (Spain–France)
  - Canonized: 3 June 1455 by Pope Callixtus III
- Antonio Pierozzi (1389–1459), Professed Priest of the Dominicans; Archbishop of Florence (Italy)
  - Canonized: 31 May 1523 by Pope Adrian VI
- Jacek Odrowąż (c. 1185–1257), Professed Priest of the Dominicans (Poland)
  - Canonized: 17 April 1594 by Pope Clement VIII
- Raimundo de Peñafort (c. 1175–1275), Professed Priest of the Dominicans; 3rd Master General (Spain)
  - Beatified: 1542 by Pope Paul III
  - Canonized: 29 April 1601 by Pope Clement VIII
- Luis Bertrán Eixarch (1526–1581), Professed Priest of the Dominicans (Spain)
  - Beatified: 19 July 1608 by Pope Paul V
  - Canonized: 12 April 1671 by Pope Clement X
- Isabel Flores de Oliva (rel. name: Rosa) (1586–1617), Layperson of the Archdiocese of Lima; Member of the Lay Dominicans (Peru)
  - Beatified: 15 April 1668 by Pope Clement IX
  - Canonized: 12 April 1671 by Pope Clement X
- Pope Pius V [Antonio Ghislieri] (rel. name: Michele) (1504–1572), Professed Priest of the Dominicans; Pope (Italy)
  - Beatified: 1 May 1672 by Pope Clement X
  - Canonized: 22 May 1712 by Pope Clement XI
- Agnese Segni (c. 1268–1317), Professed Religious of the Dominican Nuns (Italy)
  - Beatified: 1532 by Pope Clement VII
  - Canonized: 10 December 1726 by Pope Benedict XIII
- Alessandra Lucrezia de' Ricci (rel. name: Caterina) (1522–1590), Layperson of the Diocese of Prato; Member of the Lay Dominicans (Italy)
  - Beatified: 23 November 1732 by Pope Clement XII
  - Canonized: 29 June 1746 by Pope Benedict XIV
- Johannes van Hoornaar (c. 1500–1572), Professed Priest of the Dominicans; Martyr in odium fidei (Germany–Netherlands)
  - Beatified: 24 November 1675 by Pope Clement X
  - Canonized: 29 June 1865 by Pope Pius IX
- Margit of Árpád (1242–1270), Professed Religious of the Dominican Nuns (Croatia – Hungary)
  - Beatified: 28 July 1789 by Pope Pius VI
  - Canonized: 19 November 1943 by Pope Pius XII
- Louis-Marie Grignion de Montfort (1673–1716), Priest of the Archdiocese of Rennes; Founder of the Company of Mary (Montfort Missionaries), the Daughters of Wisdom and the Brothers of Saint Gabriel (France)
  - Declared "Venerable": 29 September 1869
  - Beatified: 22 January 1888 by Pope Leo XIII
  - Canonized: 20 July 1947 by Pope Pius XII
- Martín de Porres Velázquez (1579–1639), Professed Religious of the Dominicans (Peru)
  - Declared "Venerable": 27 February 1763
  - Beatified: 29 October 1837 by Pope Gregory XVI
  - Canonized: 6 May 1962 by Pope John XXIII
- Juan Arcas Sánchez (rel. name: Juan Macías) (1585–1645), Professed Religious of the Dominicans (Spain–Peru)
  - Declared "Venerable": 2 February 1762
  - Beatified: 22 October 1837 by Pope Gregory XVI
  - Canonized: 28 September 1975 by Pope Paul VI
- Zdislava Berka (c. 1220–1252), Married Layperson of the Archdiocese of Litoměřice; Member of the Lay Dominicans (Czechia)
  - Beatified: 28 August 1907 by Pope Pius X
  - Canonized: 21 May 1995 by Pope John Paul II
- Arnold Janssen (1837–1909), Priest and Founder of the Society of the Divine Word; Founder of the Sisters Servants of the Holy Spirit and Sisters Servants of the Holy Spirit of Perpetual Adoration (Germany)
  - Declared "Venerable": 10 May 1973
  - Beatified: 19 October 1975 by Pope John Paul II
  - Canonized: 5 October 2003 by Pope John Paul II
- Josef Freinademetz (1852–1908), Professed Priest of the Society of the Divine Word (Austria–China)
  - Declared "Venerable": 16 March 1970
  - Beatified: 19 October 1975 by Pope John Paul II
  - Canonized: 5 October 2003 by Pope John Paul II
- Narcisa de Jesús Martillo Morán (1832–1869), Layperson of the Archdiocese of Guayaquil; Member of the Lay Dominicans (Ecuador)
  - Declared "Venerable": 23 October 1987
  - Beatified: 25 October 1992 by Pope John Paul II
  - Canonized: 12 October 2008 by Pope Benedict XVI
- Francisco Coll Guitart (1812–1875), Professed Priest of the Dominicans; Founder of the Dominican Sisters of the Annunciation of the Blessed Virgin (Dominican Sisters of the Annunciata) (Spain)
  - Declared "Venerable": 4 May 1970
  - Beatified: 29 April 1979 by Pope John Paul II
  - Canonized: 11 October 2009 by Pope Benedict XVI
- María del Carmen Sallés y Barangueras (1848–1911), Founder of the Conceptionist Missionary Sisters of Education (Spain)
  - Declared "Venerable": 17 December 1996
  - Beatified: 15 March 1998 by Pope John Paul II
  - Canonized: 21 October 2012 by Pope Benedict XVI
- María Laura de Jesús Montoya Upegui (rel. name: Laura of Saint Catherine of Siena) (1874–1949), Founder of the Missionary Sisters of the Immaculate Virgin Mary and Saint Catherine of Siena (Colombia)
  - Declared "Venerable": 22 January 1991
  - Beatified: 25 April 2004 by Pope John Paul II
  - Canonized: 12 May 2013 by Pope Francis
- Maryam Sūltanah Danil Ghaţţas (rel. name: Marie-Alphonsine) (1843–1927), Cofounder of the Sisters of the Holy Rosary of Jerusalem of the Latins (Rosary Sisters) (Israel)
  - Declared "Venerable": 15 December 1994
  - Beatified: 22 November 2009 by Cardinal Angelo Amato, S.D.B.
  - Canonized: 17 May 2015 by Pope Francis
- José Gabriel del Rosario Brochero (1840–1914), Priest of the Archdiocese of Córdoba (Argentina)
  - Declared "Venerable": 19 April 2004
  - Beatified: 14 September 2013 by Cardinal Angelo Amato, S.D.B.
  - Canonized: 16 October 2016 by Pope Francis
- Bartolomeu Fernandes (rel. name: Bartolomeu dos Mártires) (1514–1590), Professed Priest of the Dominicans; Archbishop of Braga (Portugal)
- Declared "Venerable": 23 May 1845
  - Beatified: 4 November 2001 by Pope John Paul II
  - Canonized: 5 July 2019 by Pope Francis
- Margherita of Città di Castello (c. 1287–1320), Layperson of the Diocese of Città di Castello; Member of the Lay Dominicans (Italy)
  - Beatified: 19 October 1609 by Pope Paul V
  - Canonized: 24 April 2021 by Pope Francis
- Pier Giorgio Frassati (1901–1925), Young Layperson of the Archdiocese of Turin; Member of the Lay Dominicans (Italy)
  - Declared "Venerable": 23 October 1987
  - Beatified: 20 May 1990 by Pope John Paul II
  - Canonized: 7 September 2025 by Pope Leo XIV
- Bartolo Longo (1841–1926), Married Layperson of the Diocese of Pompei; Member of the Lay Dominicans; Founder of the Dominican Sisters of Pompei (Italy)
  - Declared "Venerable": 3 October 1975
  - Beatified: 26 October 1980 by Pope John Paul II
  - Canonized: 19 October 2025 by Pope Leo XIV

== Blesseds ==
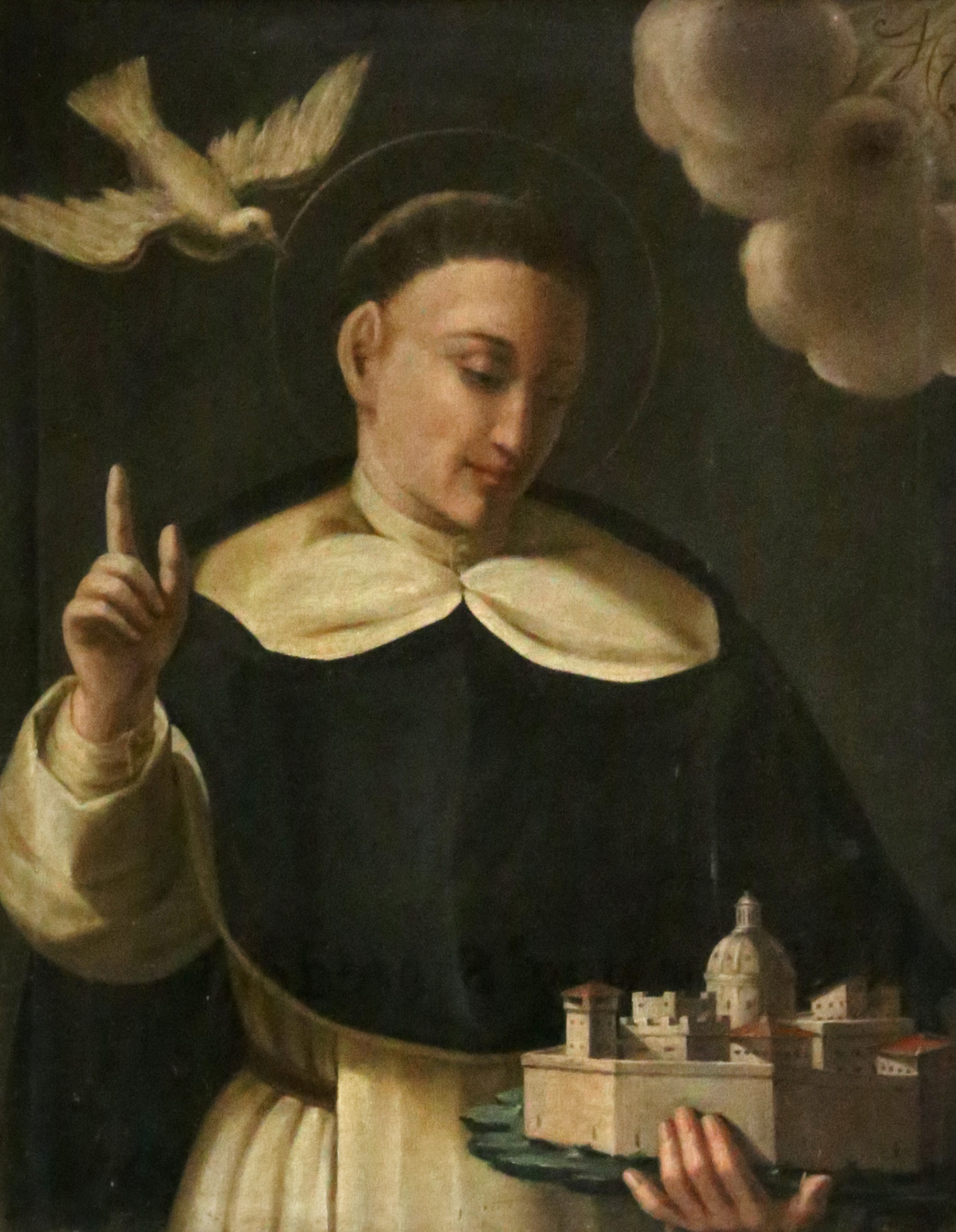
Ambrogio Sansedoni

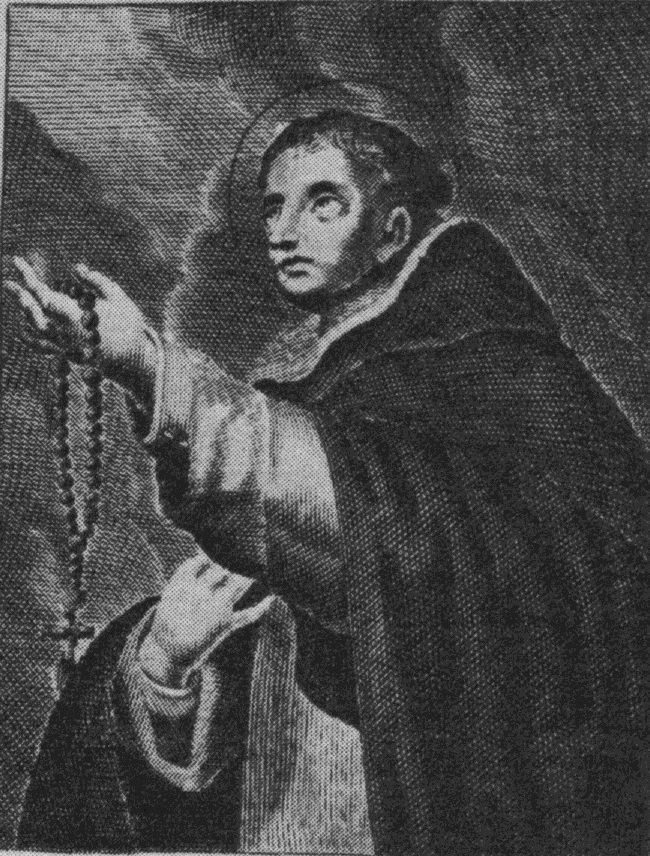
Móric Csák

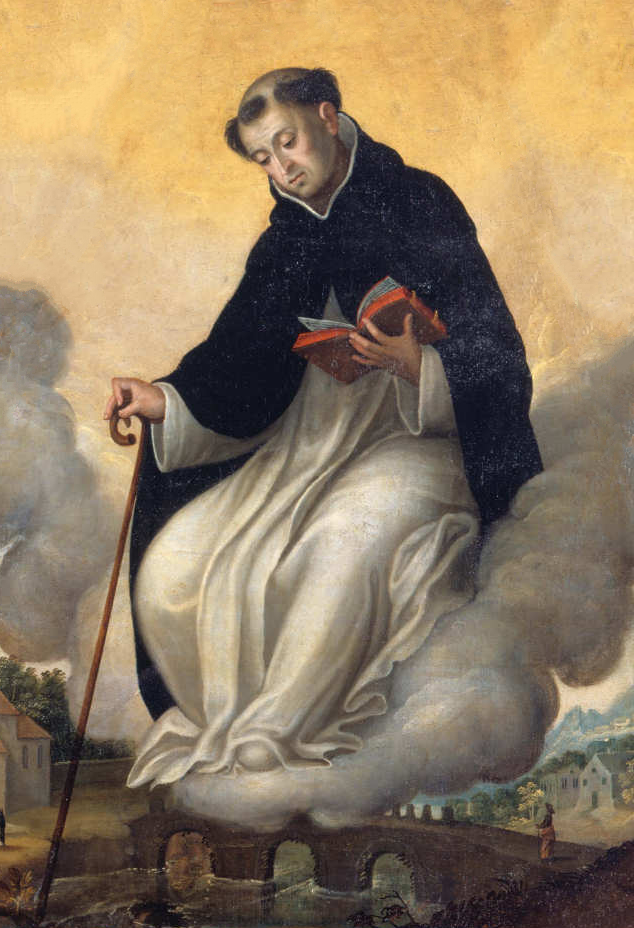
Gonçalo de Amarante

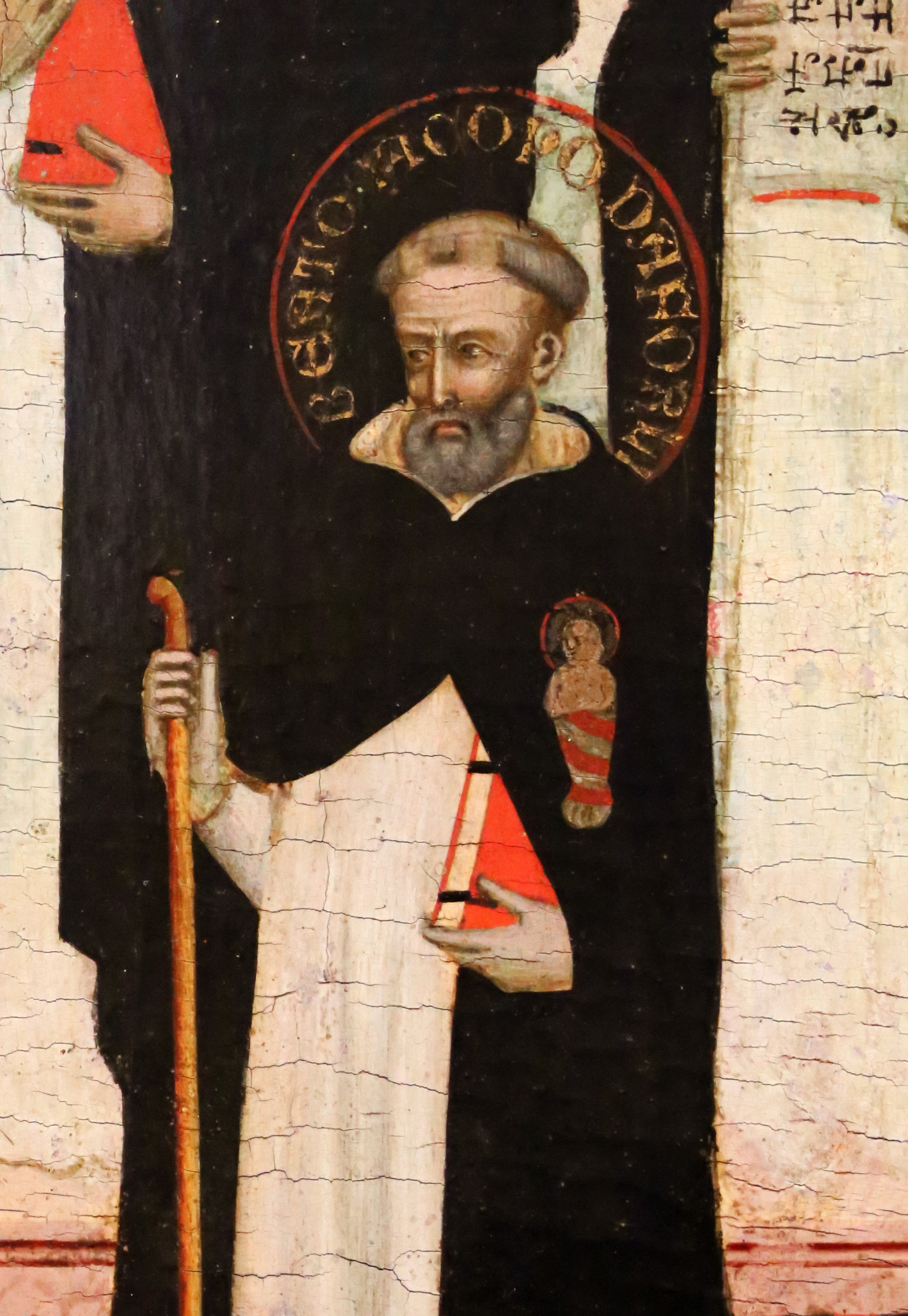
Giacomo Salomoni

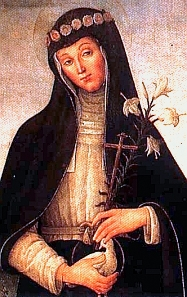
Columba Guadagnoli

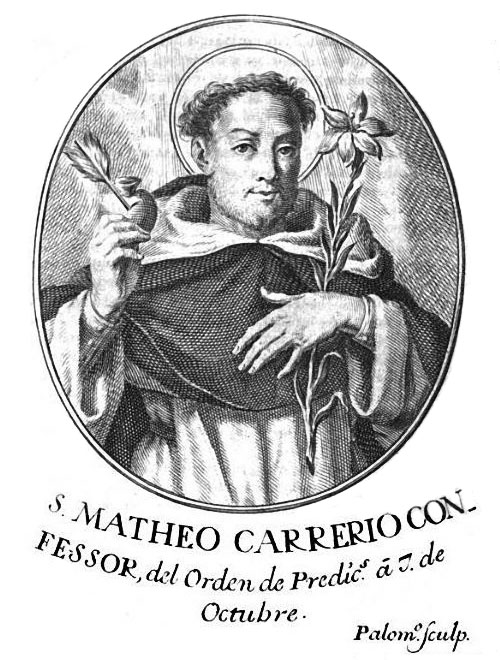
Matteo Carreri

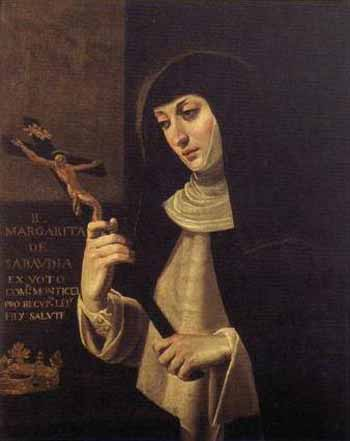
Margherita di Savoia

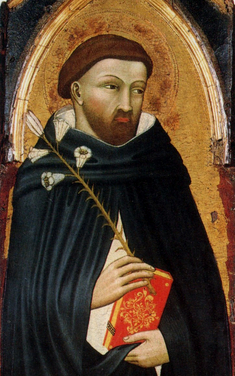
Giacomo Bianconi

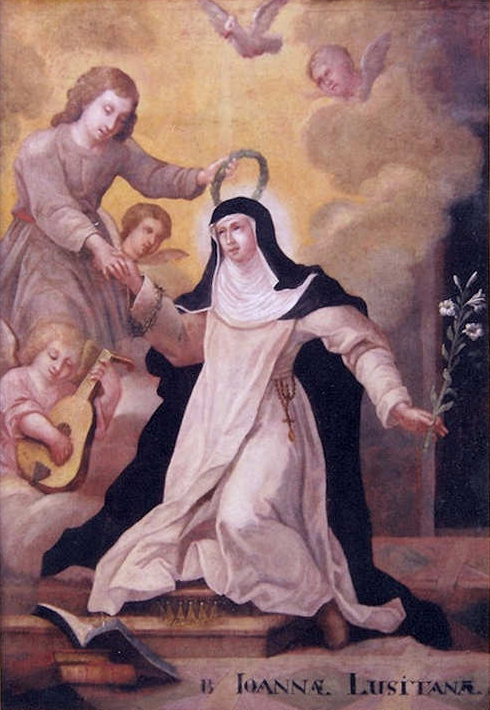
Joana de Portugal

Osanna Andreasi

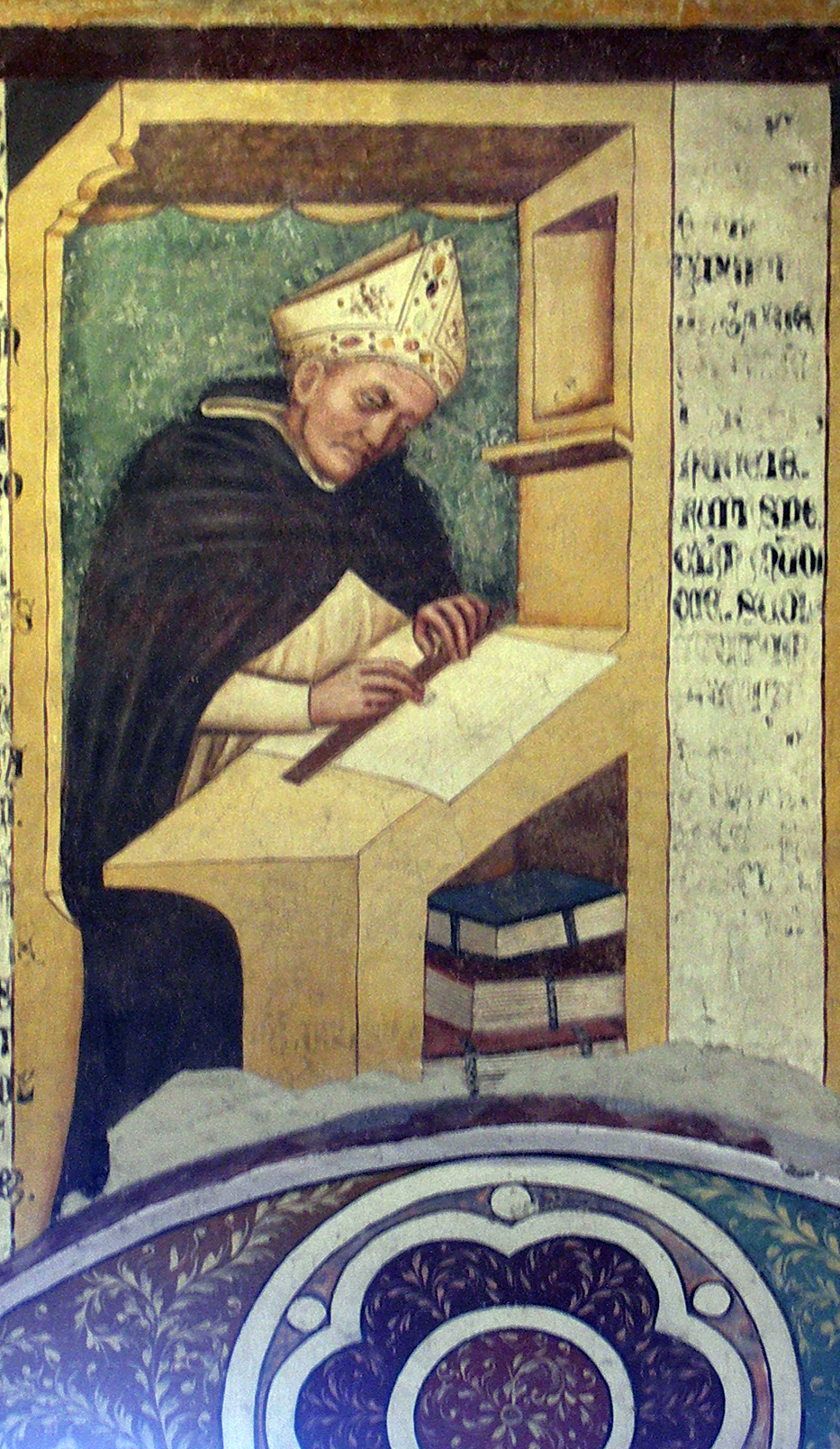
Augustin Kažotić

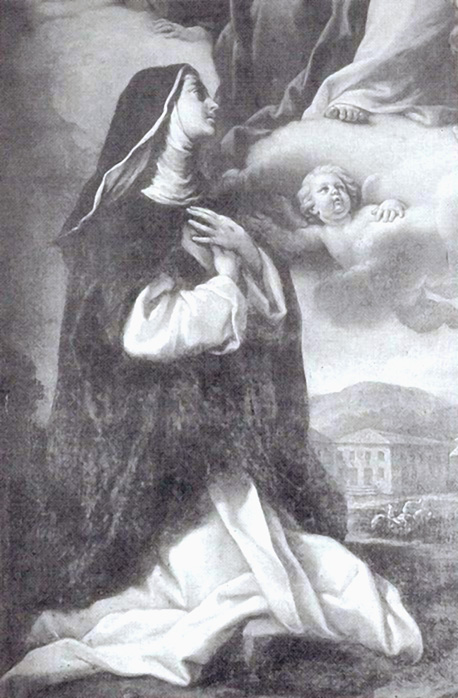
Lucia Brocadelli

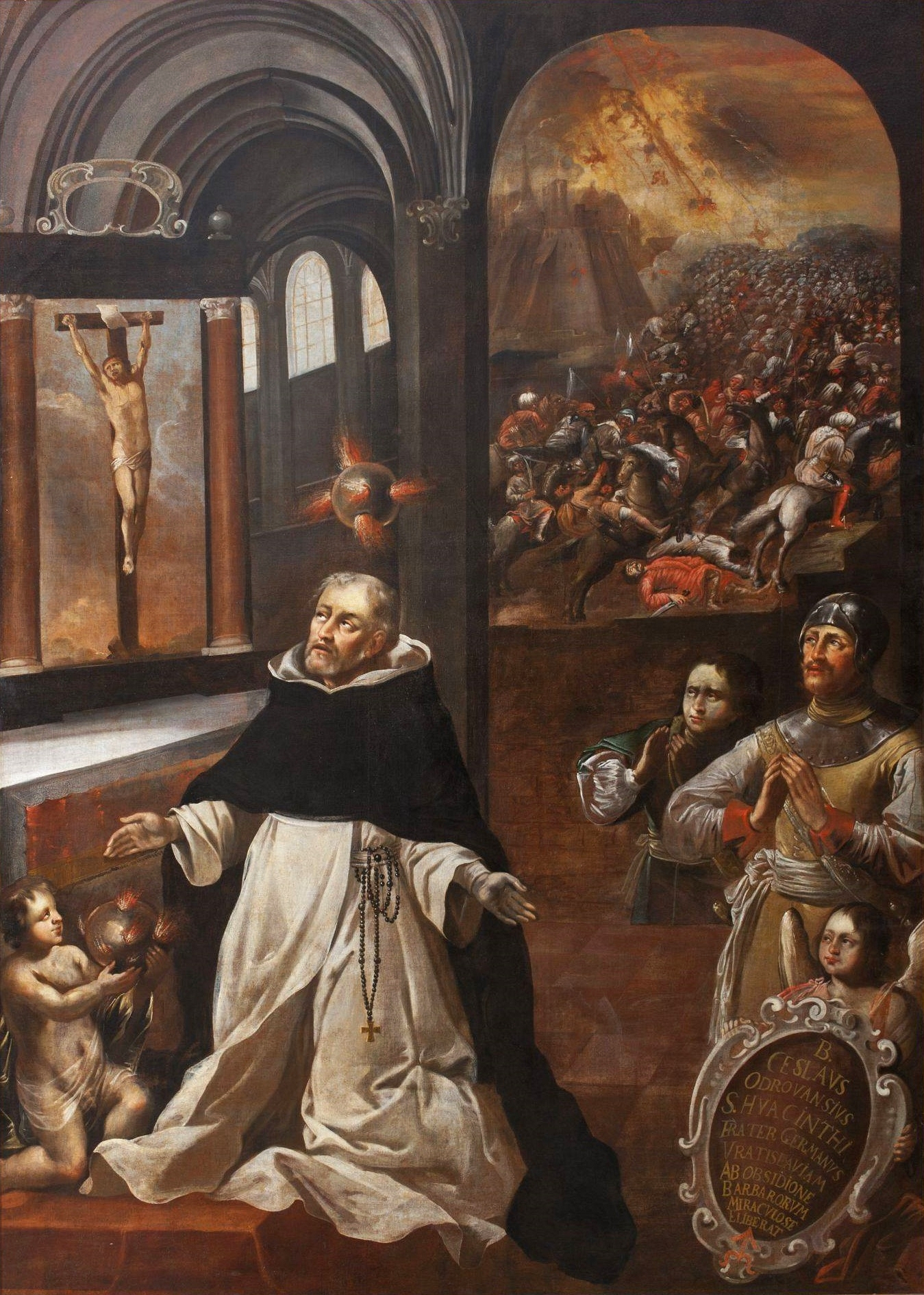
Czesław Odrowąż

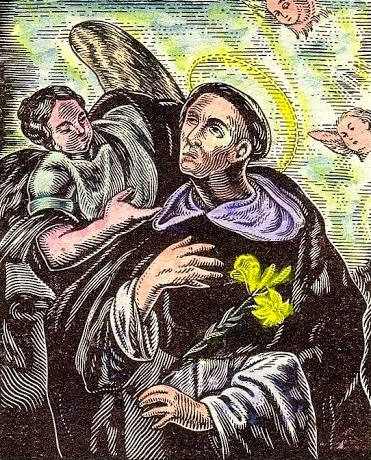
Dalmau Moner

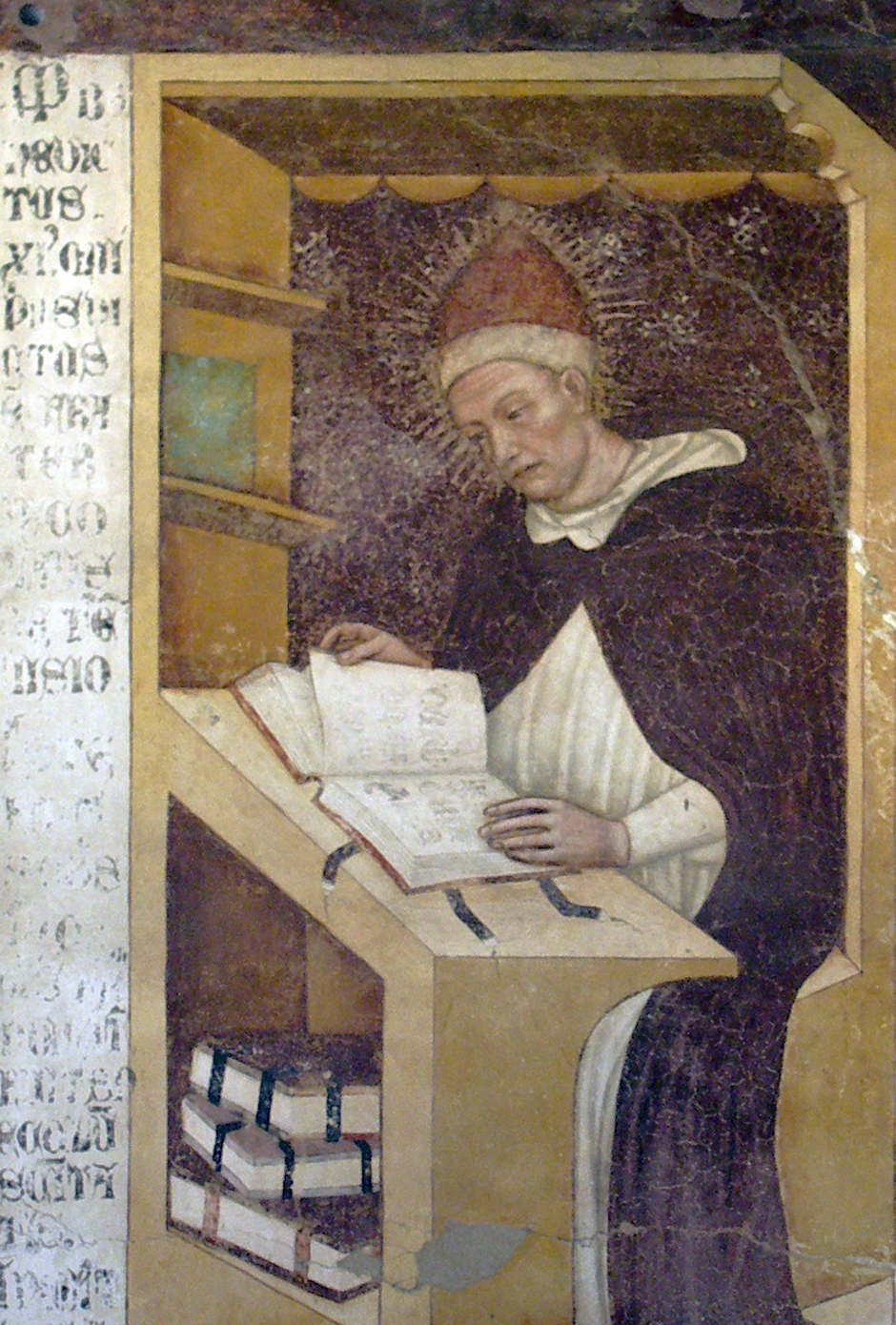
Pope Benedict XI

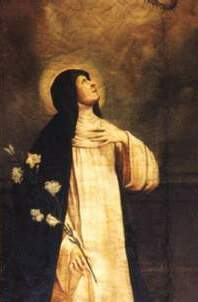
Stefana Quinzani

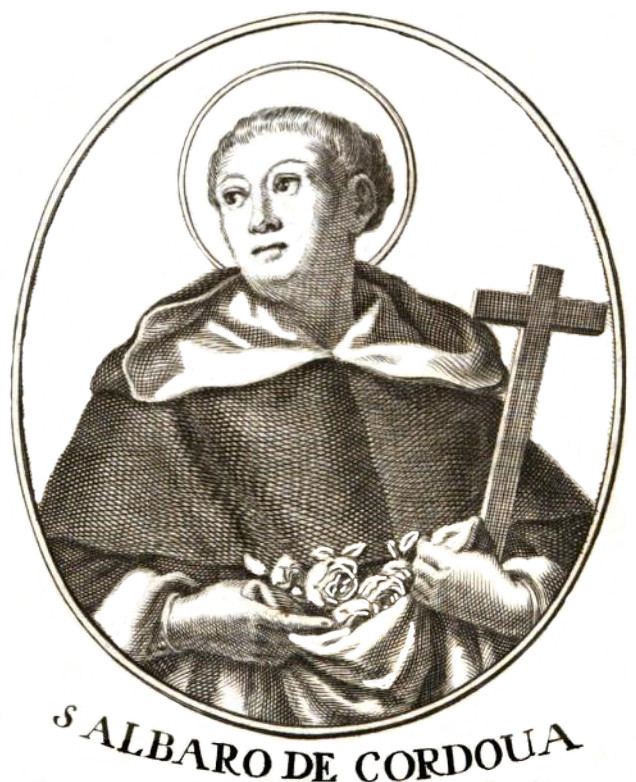
Álvaro de Córdoba

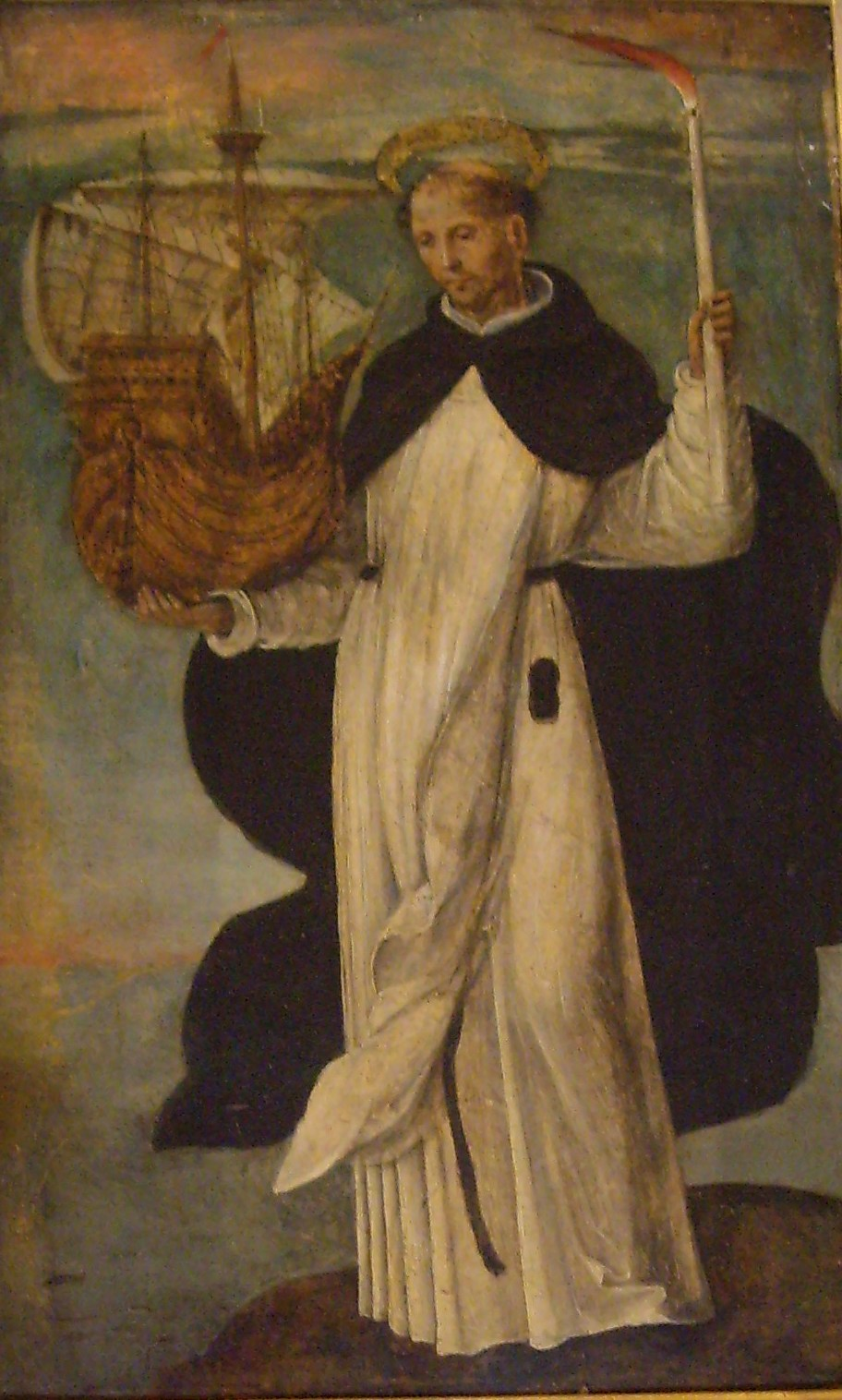
Pedro González Telmo

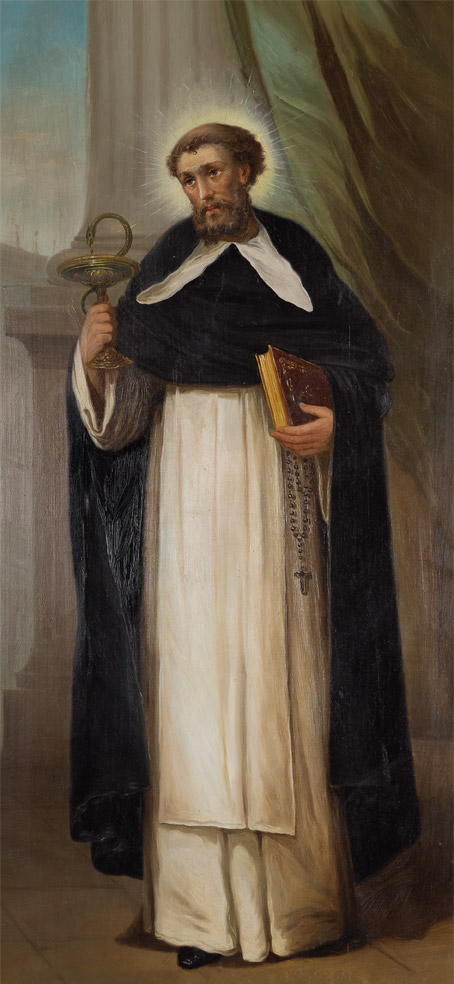
Gil de Santarém

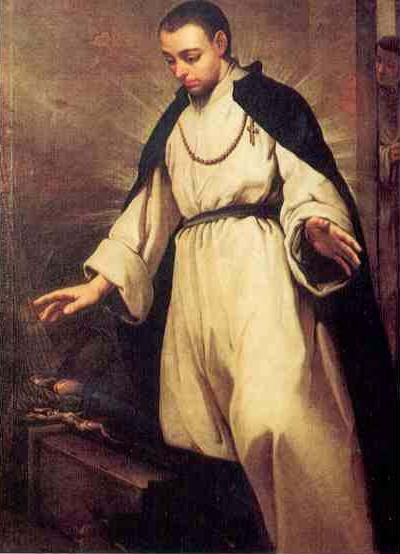
Alberto da Bergamo

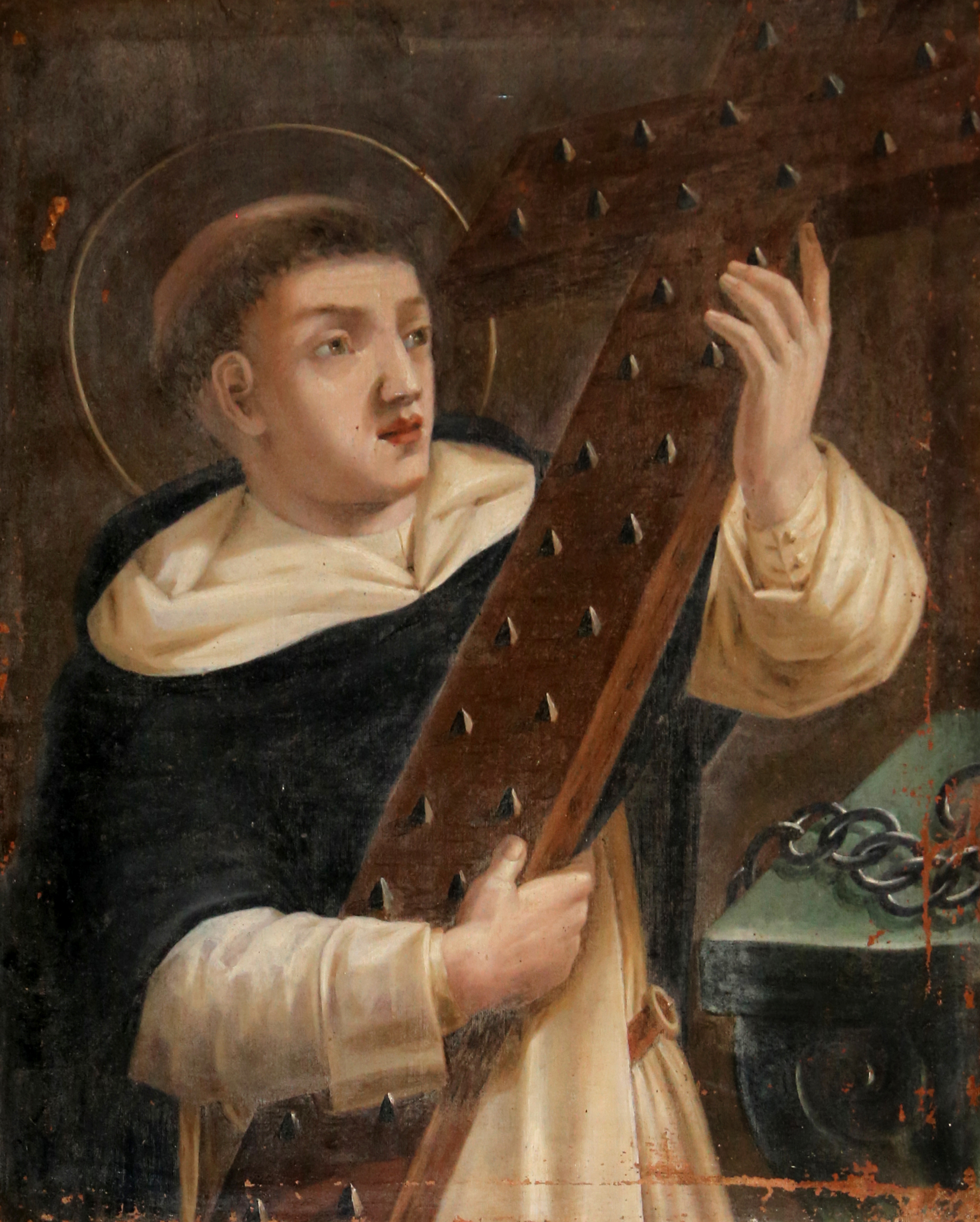
Giovanni Liccio

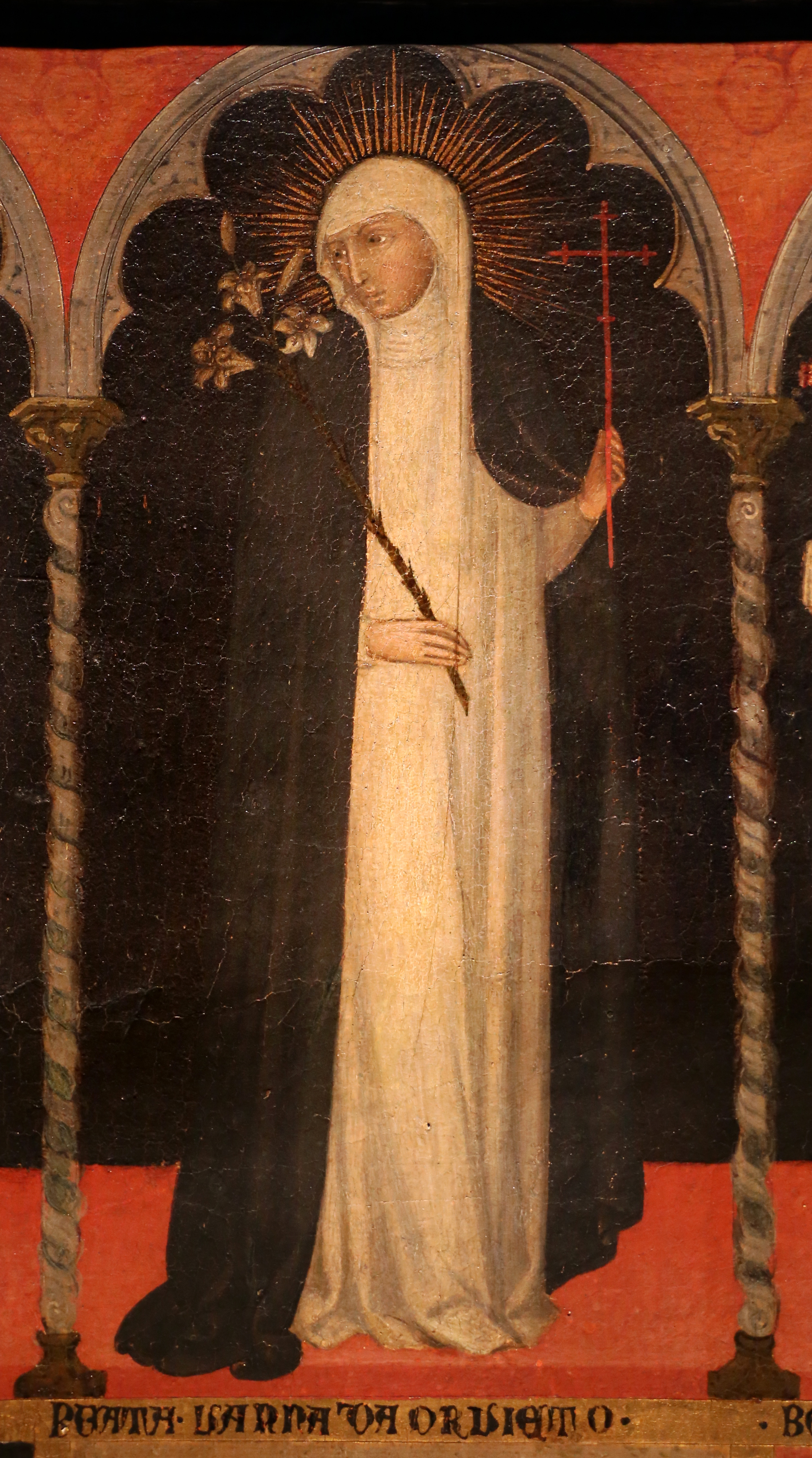
Giovanna da Orvieto

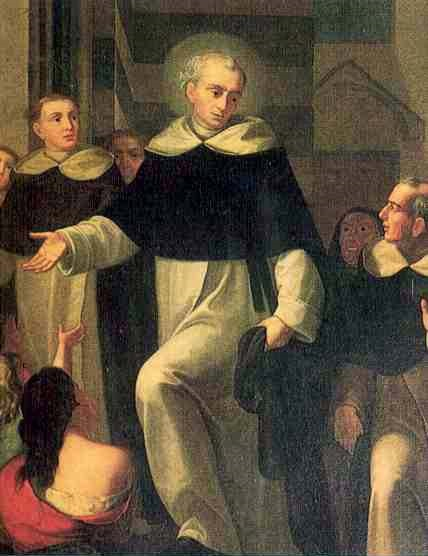
Sebastian Maggi

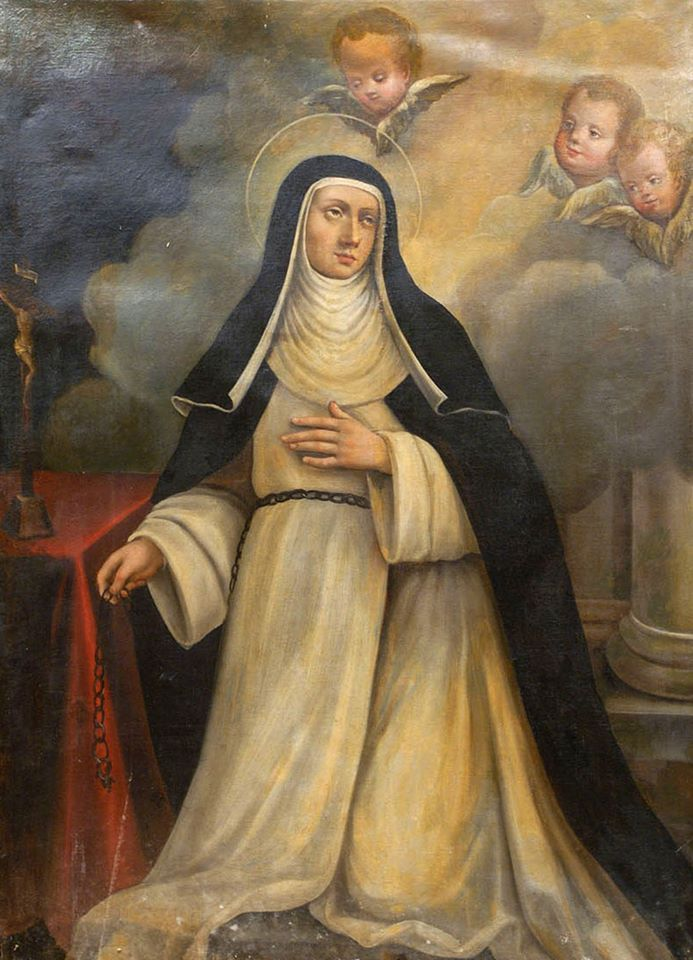
Benvenuta Boiani

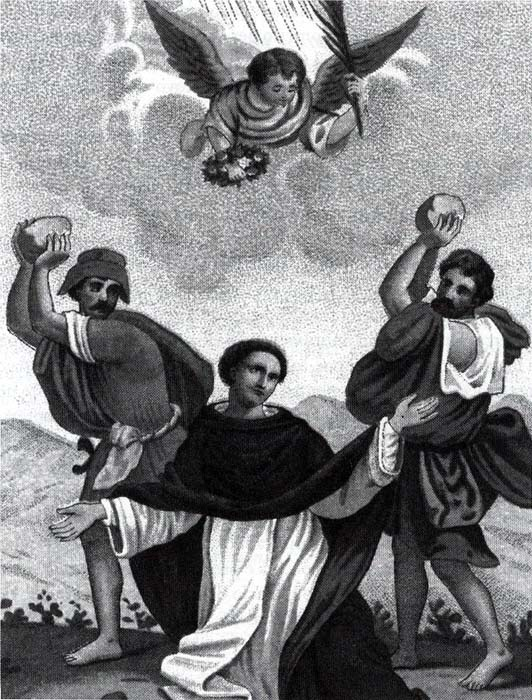
Antonio Neirotti

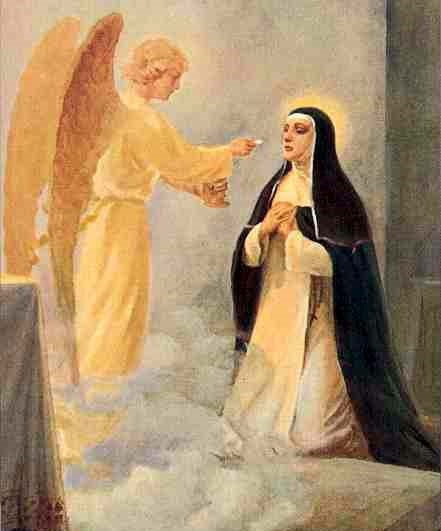
Emilia Bicchieri

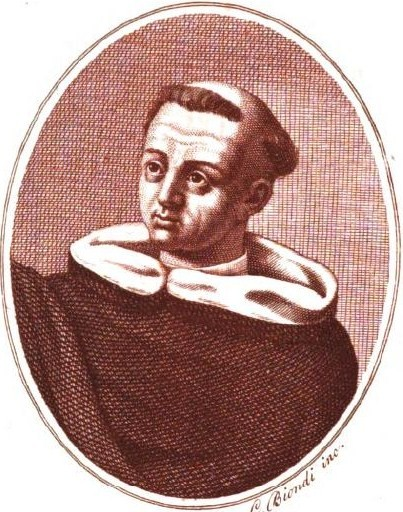
Pietro Geremia

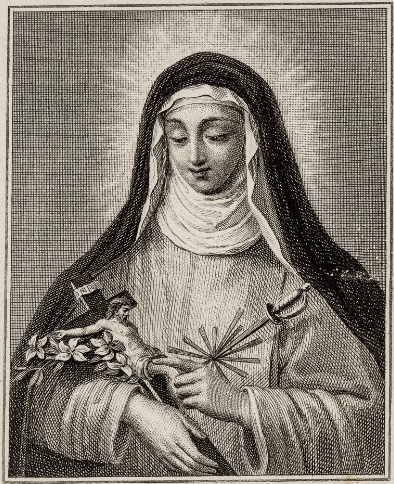
Maria Bartolomea Bagnesi

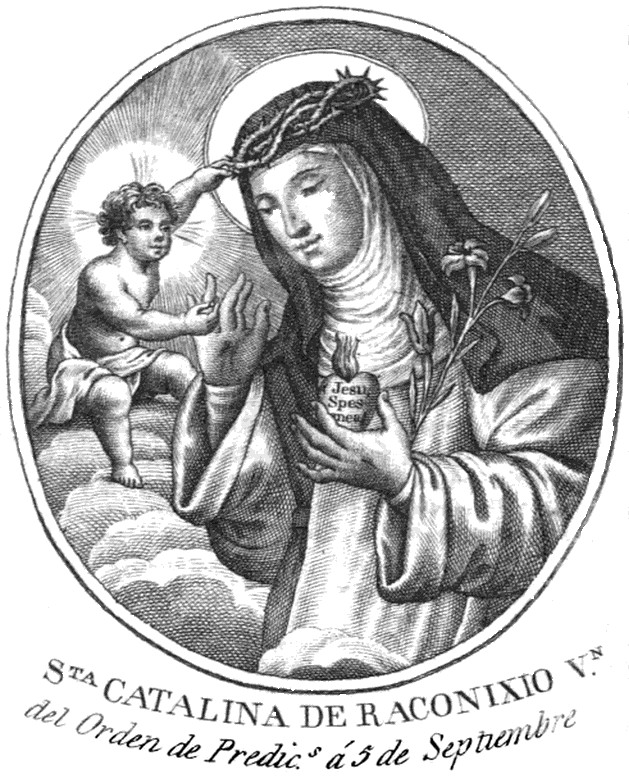
Caterina Mattei

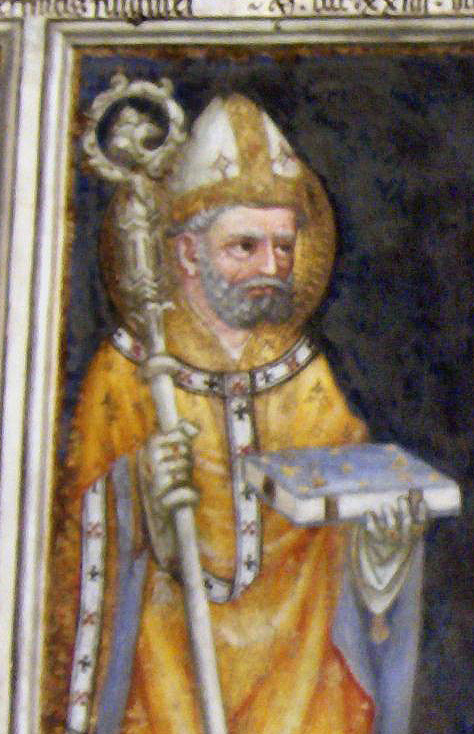
Giacomo da Varazze

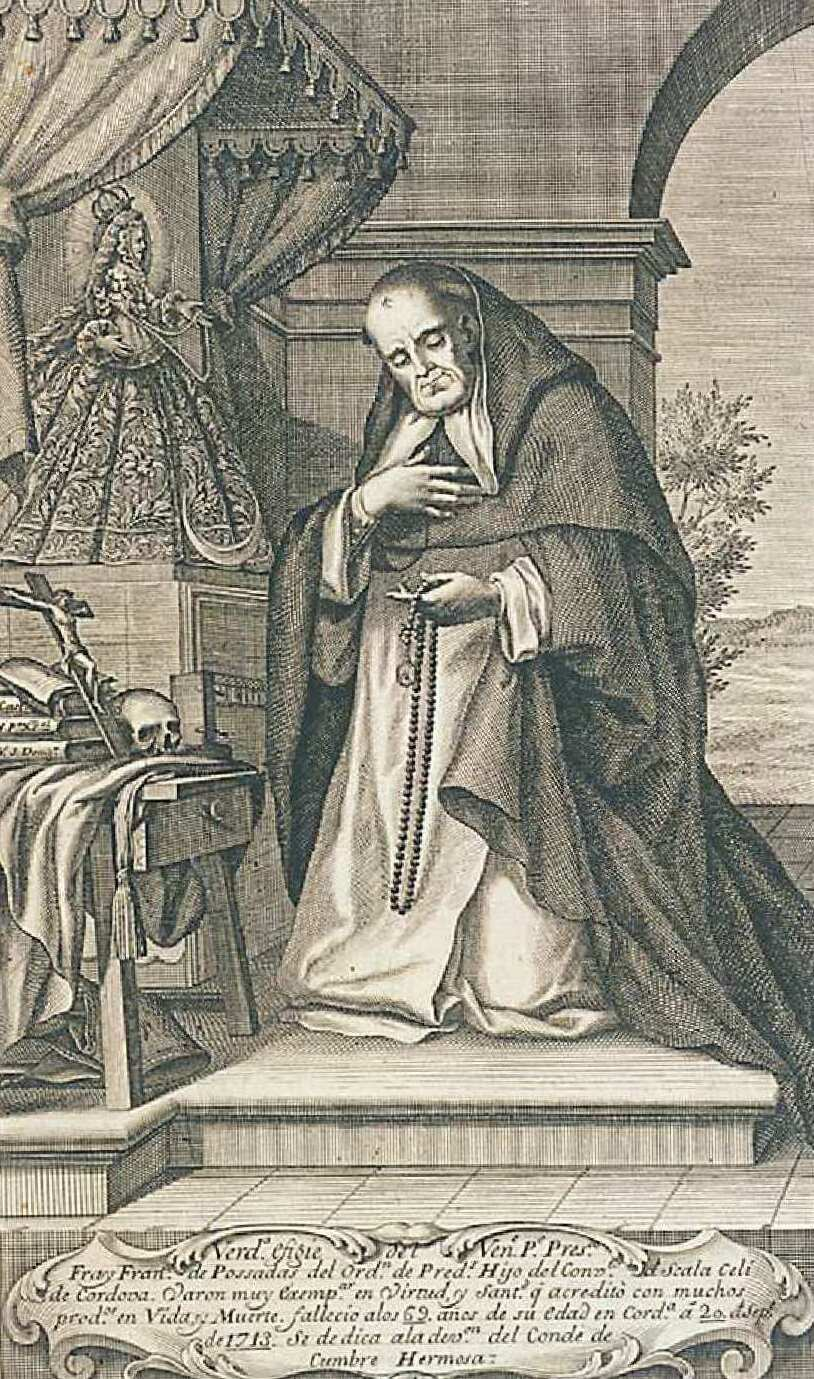
Francisco de Posadas

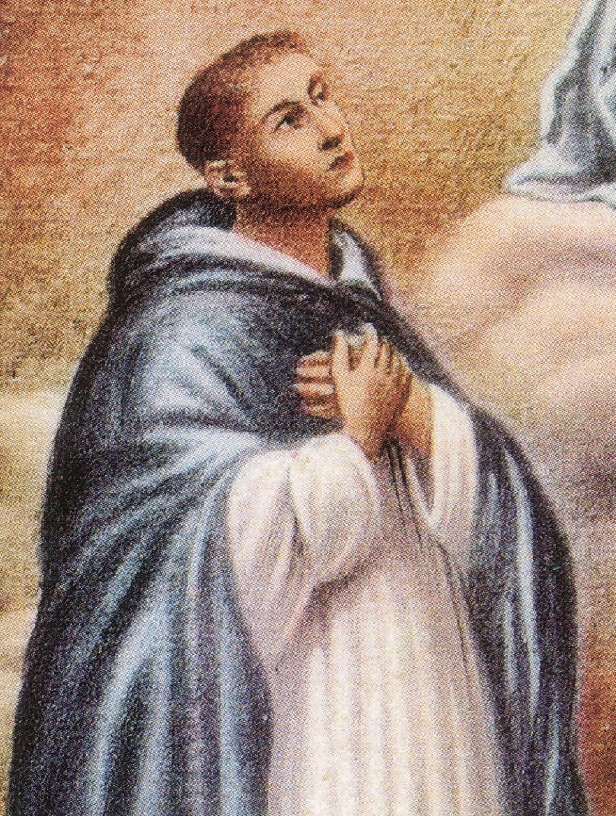
Antonio della Chiesa
- Ambrogio da Siena (Ambrogio Sansedoni) (c. 1220–1287), Professed Priest of the Dominicans (Italy)
  - Beatified: 14 September 1443 by Pope Eugene IV
- Móric Csák (c. 1270–1336), Professed Priest of the Dominicans (Hungary)
  - Beatified: 1494 by Pope Alexander VI
- Ingrid av Skännige (Ingrid Elovsodtter) (c. 1220–1282), Professed Religious of the Dominican Nuns (Sweden)
  - Beatified: 16 March 1499 by Pope Alexander VI
- Gonçalo de Amarante (C. 1187–1259), Professed Priest of the Dominicans (Portugal)
  - Beatified: 16 September 1561 by Pope Pius IV
- Giacomo Salomoni (1231–1314), Professed Priest of the Dominicans (Italy)
  - Beatified: 22 September 1621 by Pope Gregory XV
- Colomba da Rieti (Colomba Guadagnoli) (1467–1501), Layperson of the Diocese of Rieti; Member of the Lay Dominicans (Italy)
  - Beatified: 25 February 1625 by Pope Urban VIII
- Matteo Carreri (Gianfrancesco Carreri) (rel. name: Matteo) (c. 1420–1470), Professed Religious of the Dominicans (Italy)
  - Beatified: 2 December 1625 by Pope Urban VIII
- Margherita di Savoia (1390–1464), Widow; Professed Religious of the Dominican Nuns (Italy)
  - Beatified: 8 October 1669 by Pope Clement IX
- Giacomo da Bevagna (Giacomo Bianconi) (1220–1301), Professed Priest of the Dominicans (Italy)
  - Beatified: 18 May 1672 by Pope Clement X
- Joana de Portugal (1452–1490), Professed Religious of the Dominican Nuns (Portugal)
  - Beatified: 16 February 1692 by Pope Innocent XII
- Osanna di Mantova (Osanna Andreasi) (1449–1505), Layperson of the Diocese of Mantua; Member of the Lay Dominicans (Italy)
  - Beatified: 24 November 1694 by Pope Innocent XII
- Agostino Cassoti (Augustin Kažotić) (c. 1260–1323), Professed Priest of the Dominicans; Bishop of Zagreb (Croatia–Italy)
  - Beatified: 17 July 1700 by Pope Innocent XII
- Lucia da Narni (Lucia Brocadelli) (1476–1544), Layperson of the Diocese of Terni-Narni-Amelia; Member of the Lay Dominicans (Italy)
  - Beatified: 1 March 1710 by Pope Clement XI
- Czesław Odrowąż (c. 1175–1242), Professed Priest of the Dominicans (Poland)
  - Beatified: 27 August 1712 by Pope Clement XI
- Dalmau (Dalmacio) Moner (1291–1341), Professed Priest of the Dominicans (Spain)
  - Beatified: 13 August 1721 by Pope Innocent XIII
- Pope Benedict XI (Nicola Boccasini) (1240–1304), Professed Priest of the Dominicans; 9th Master General; Pope (Italy)
  - Beatified: 24 April 1736 by Pope Clement XII
- Stefana Quinzani (1457–1530), Layperson of the Archdiocese of Milan; Member of the Lay Dominicans (Italy)
  - Beatified: 14 December 1740 by Pope Benedict XIV
- Álvaro de Córdoba (de Zamora) (1360–1430), Professed Priest of the Dominicans (Spain)
  - Beatified: 22 September 1741 by Pope Benedict XIV
- Pedro (Telmo) González (1190–1246), Professed Priest of the Dominicans (Spain)
  - Beatified: 13 December 1741 by Pope Benedict XIV
- Gil de Santarem (Gil Rodrigues de Valadares) (c. 1185–1265), Professed Priest of the Dominicans (Portugal)
  - Beatified: 9 May 1748 by Pope Benedict XIV
- Alberto da Bergamo (c. 1214–1279), Married Layperson of the Diocese of Cremona; Member of the Lay Dominicans (Italy)
  - Beatified: 9 May 1748 by Pope Benedict XIV
- Marcolino da Forli (Marcolino Amanni) (1317–1397), Professed Priest of the Dominicans (Italy)
  - Beatified: 9 May 1750 by Pope Benedict XIV
- Giovanni Liccio (1426–1511), Professed Priest of the Dominicans (Italy)
  - Beatified: 25 April 1753 by Pope Benedict XIV
- Giovanna da Orvieto (1264–1306), Layperson of the Diocese of Orvieto-Todi; Member of the Lay Dominicans (Italy)
  - Beatified: 11 September 1754 by Pope Benedict XIV
- Sebastiano Maggi (1414–1496), Professed Priest of the Dominicans (Italy)
  - Beatified: 15 April 1760 by Pope Clement XIII
- Benvenuta Boiani (1254–1292), Layperson of the Archdiocese of Udine; Member of the Lay Dominicans (Italy)
  - Beatified: 6 February 1765 by Pope Clement XIII
- Antonio da Rivoli (Antonio Neirotti) (c. 1425–1460), Professed Priest of the Dominicans; Martyr in odium fidei (Italy–Tunisia)
  - Beatified: 22 February 1767 by Pope Clement XIII
- Emilia Bicchieri (1238–1314), Professed Religious of the Dominican Nuns (Italy)
  - Beatified: 19 July 1769 by Pope Clement XIV
- Giovanni da Salerno (Giovanni Guarna) (c. 1190–1242), Professed Priest of the Dominicans (Italy)
  - Beatified: 2 April 1793 by Pope Pius VI
- Pietro Geremia (1399–1452), Professed Priest of the Dominicans (Italy)
  - Beatified: 12 May 1784 by Pope Pius VI
- Bartolomeo da Vicenza (Bartolomeo di Breganze) (c. 1200–1270), Professed Priest of the Dominicans; Bishop of Vicenza (Italy)
  - Beatified: 11 September 1793 by Pope Pius VI
- Maria Bartolomea Bagnesi (1514–1577), Layperson of the Archdiocese of Florence; Member of the Lay Dominicans (Italy)
  - Beatified: 11 July 1804 by Pope Pius VII
- Caterina da Racconigi (Caterina Mattei) (1486–1574), Layperson of the Diocese of Cuneo; Member of the Lay Dominicans (Italy)
  - Beatified: 9 April 1808 by Pope Pius VII
- Pietro da Citta di Castello (Pietro Capocci) (c. 1390–1445), Professed Priest of the Dominicans (Italy)
  - Beatified: 11 May 1816 by Pope Pius VII
- Giacomo (Iacopo) of Varazze (c. 1226–1298), Professed Priest of the Dominicans; Archbishop of Genoa (Italy)
  - Beatified: 11 May 1816 by Pope Pius VII
- Francisco Martín Fernández de Posadas (1644–1713), Professed Priest of the Dominicans (Spain)
  - Beatified: 20 September 1818 by Pope Pius VII
- Antonio della Chiesa di San Germano (1394–1459), Professed Priest of the Dominicans (Italy)
  - Beatified: 15 May 1819 by Pope Pius VII
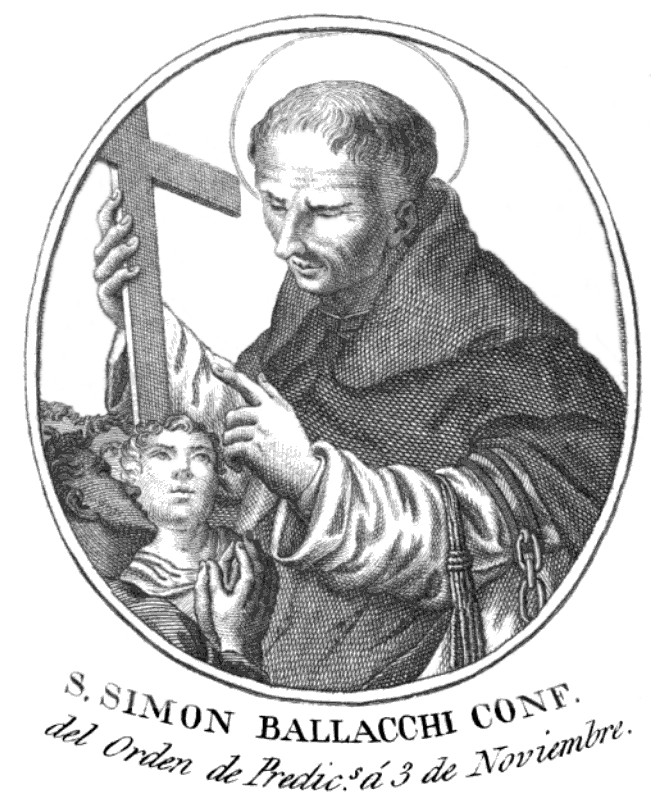
Simone Ballachi

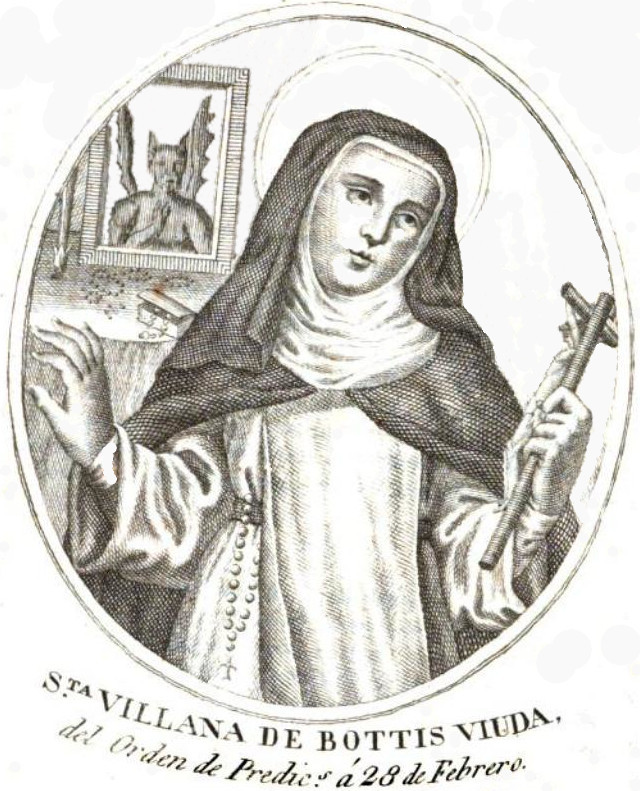
Villana de' Botti

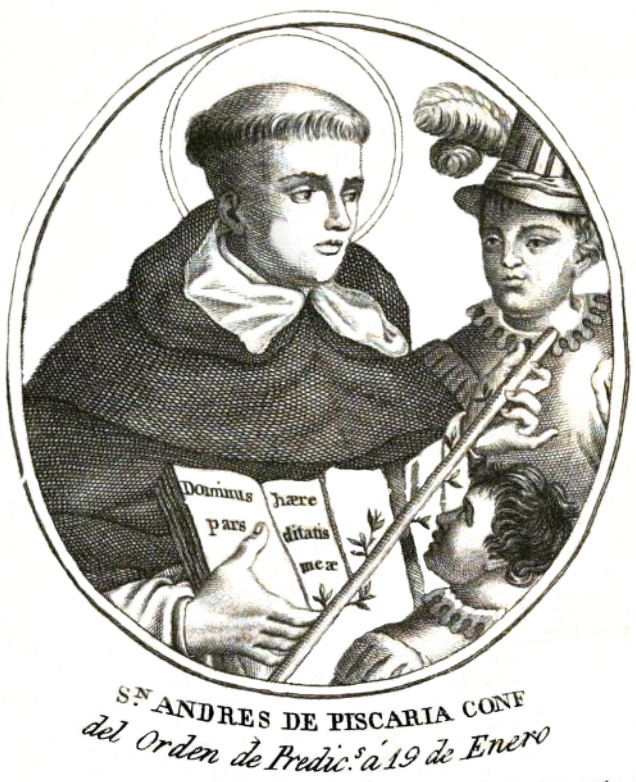
Andrea Grego

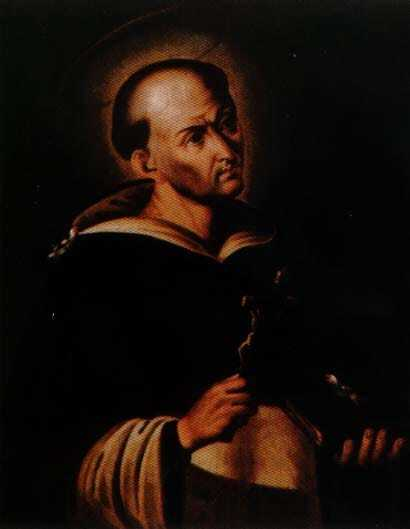
Bernardo Scammaca

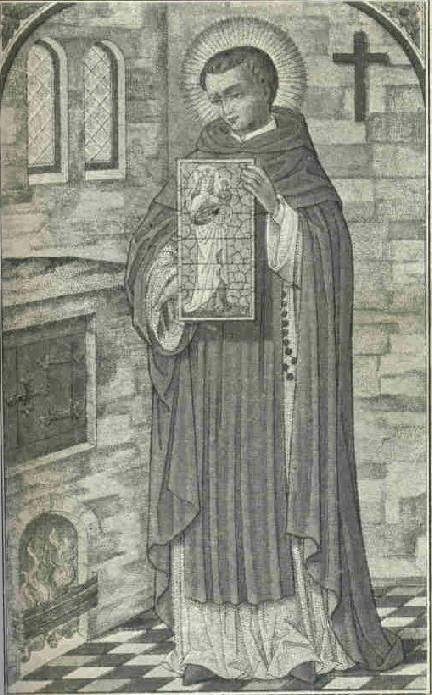
Jakob Griesinger

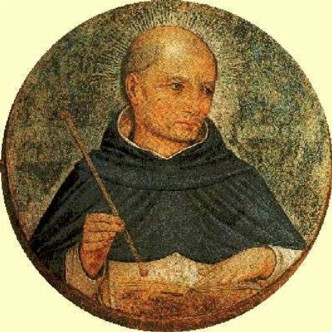
Jordan von Sachsen

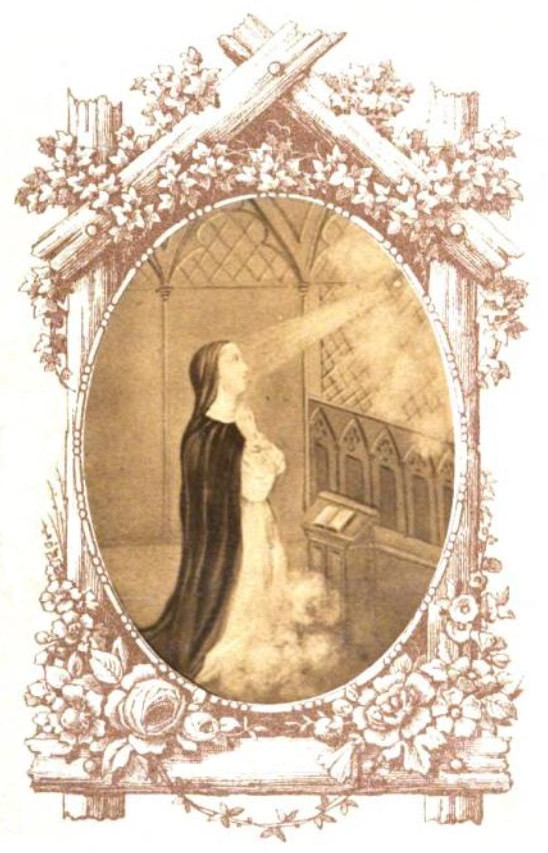
Imelda Lambertini

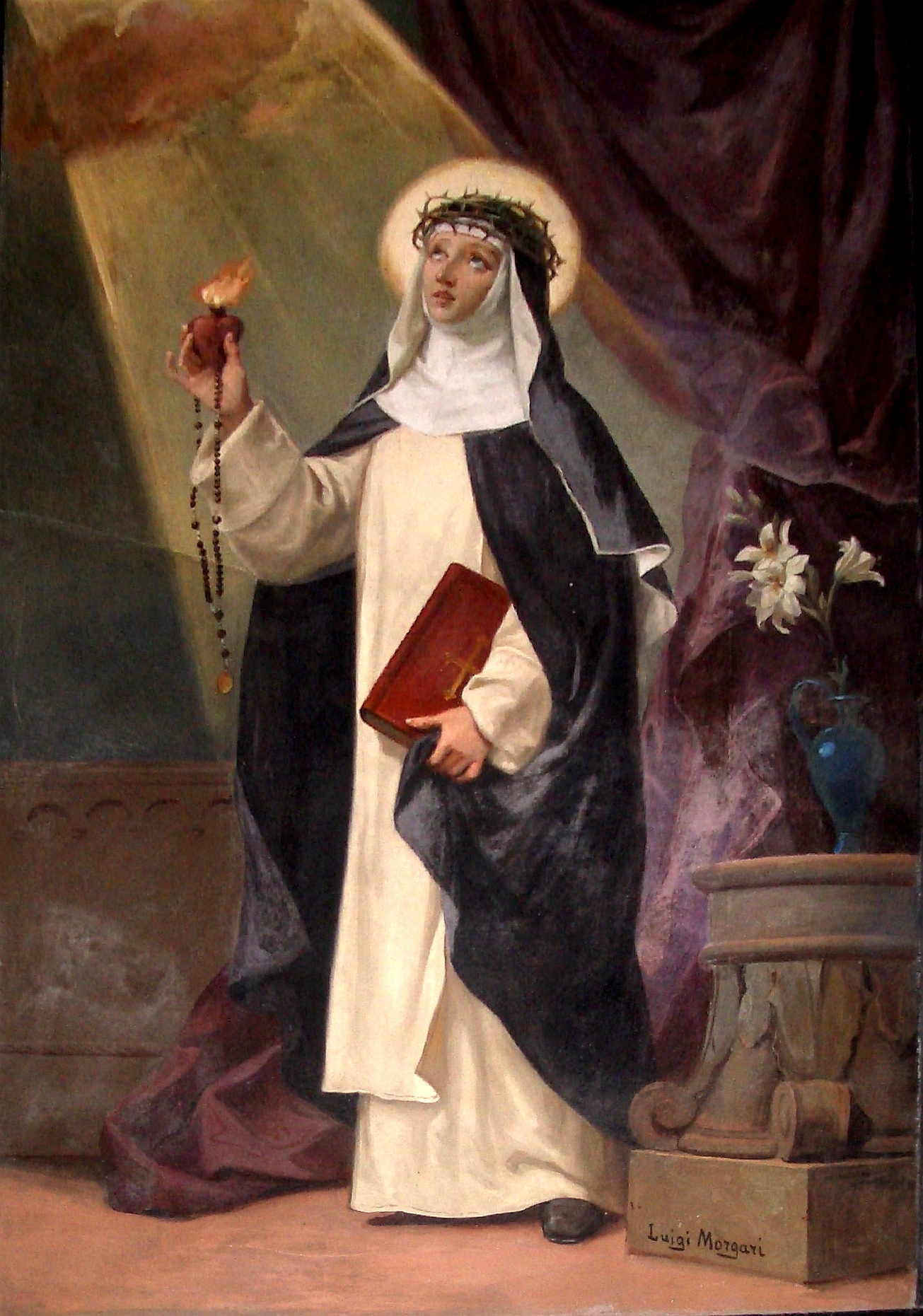
Maddalena Panattieri

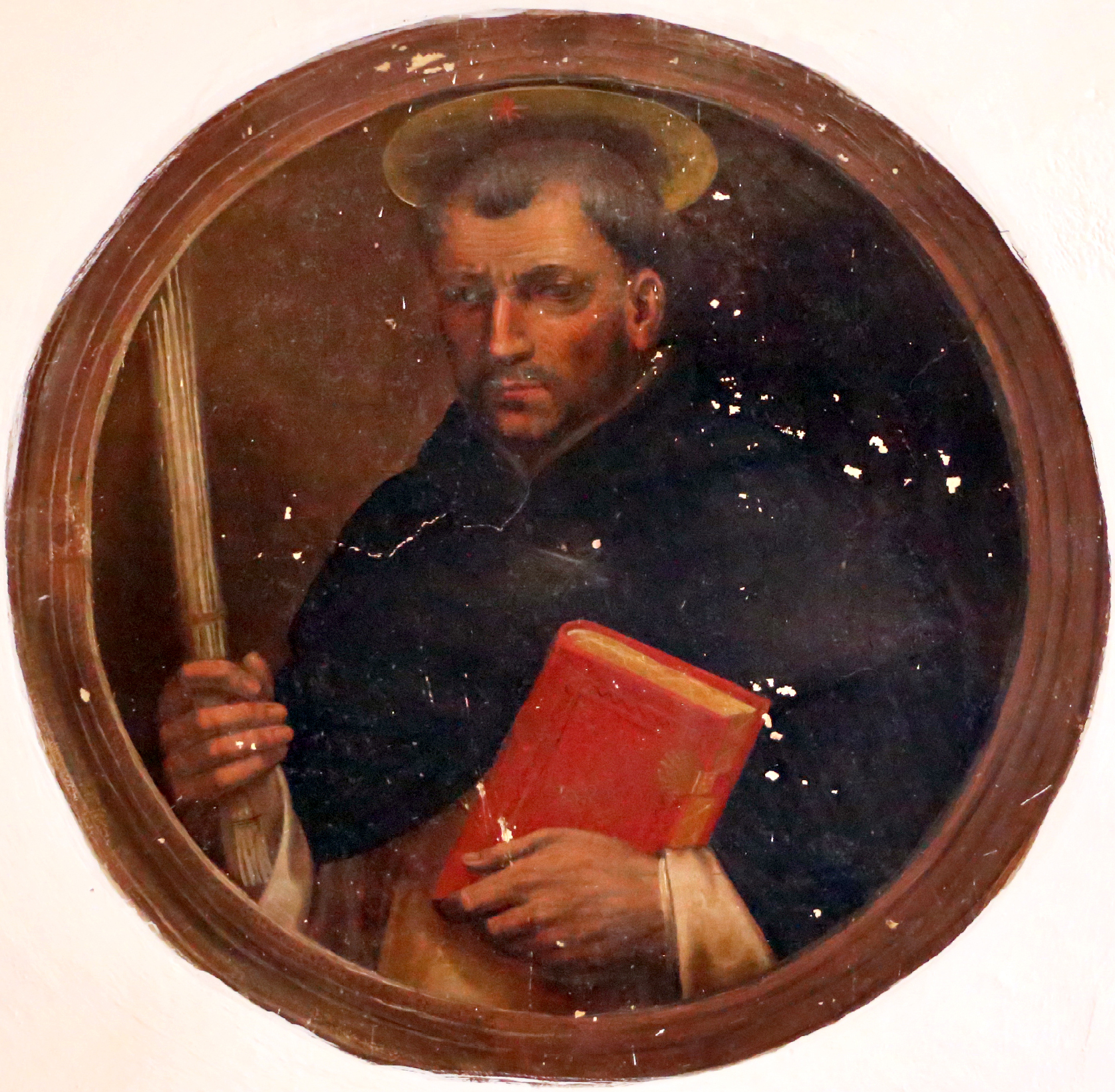
Nicola Paglia

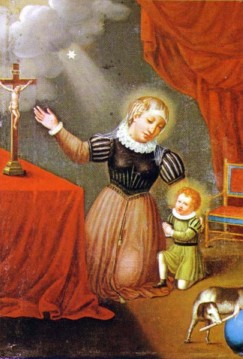
Juana de Aza de Guzmán

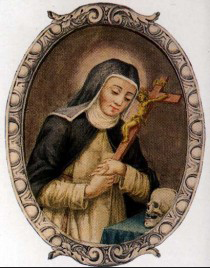
Chiara Gambacorti

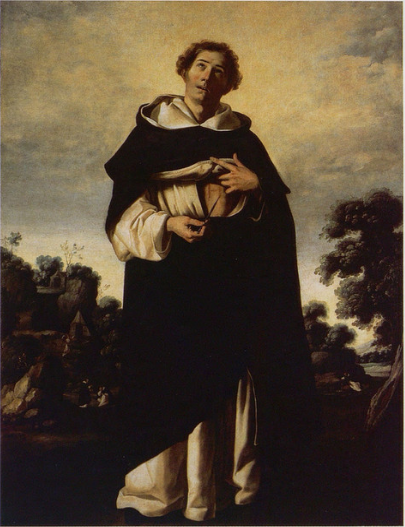
Heinrich Seuse

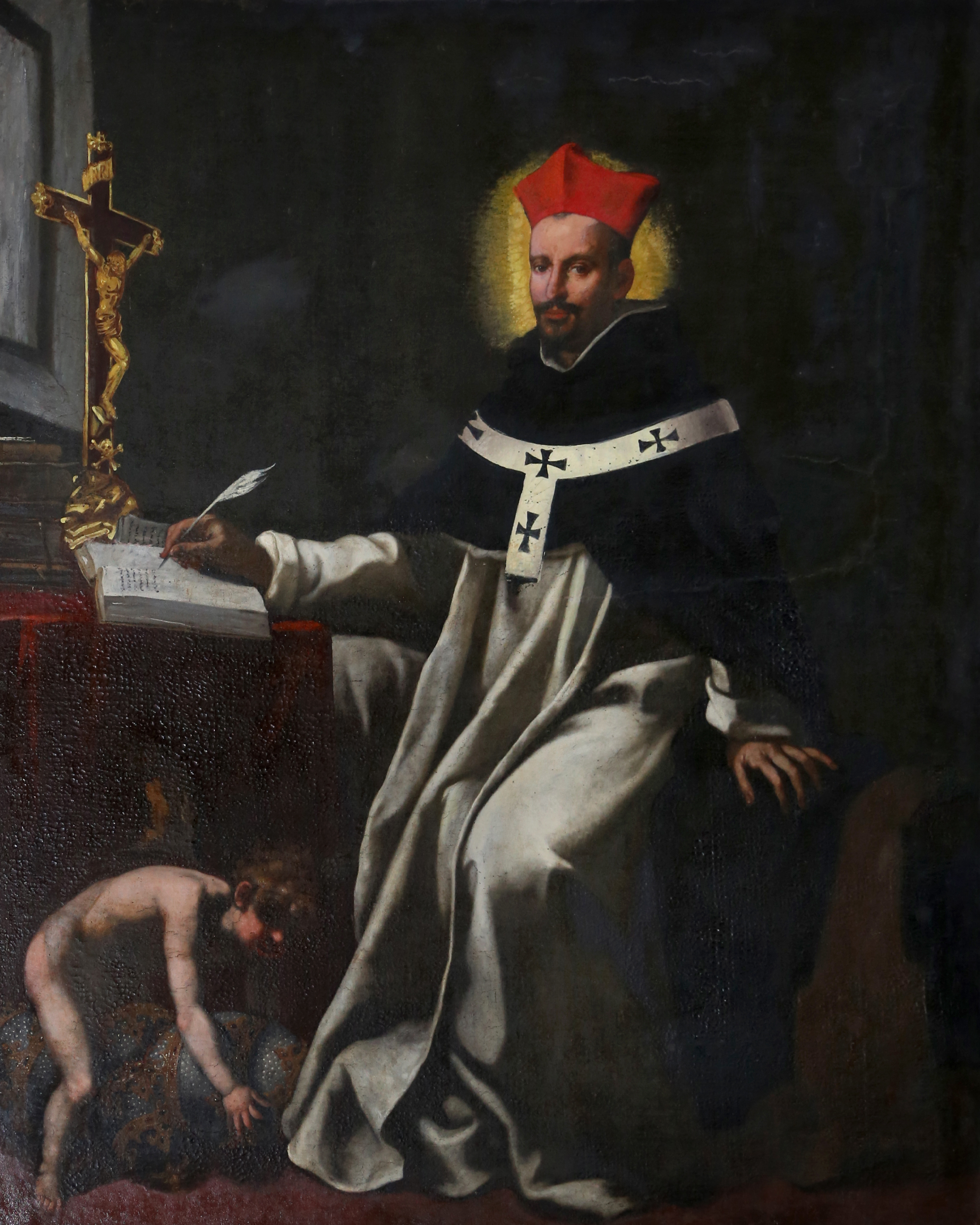
Giovanni Dominici

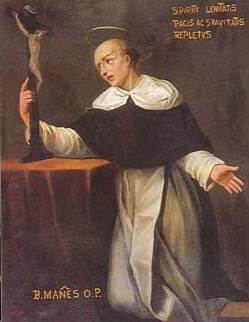
Manés de Guzmán

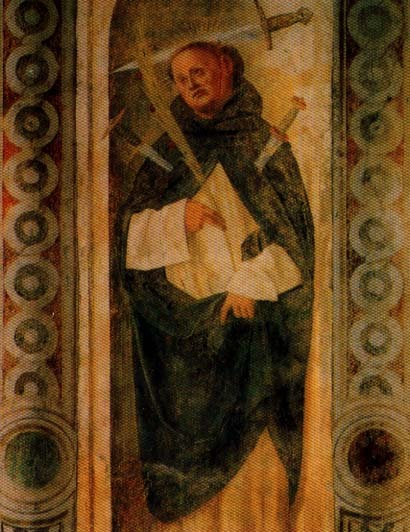
Bartolomeo Cerveri

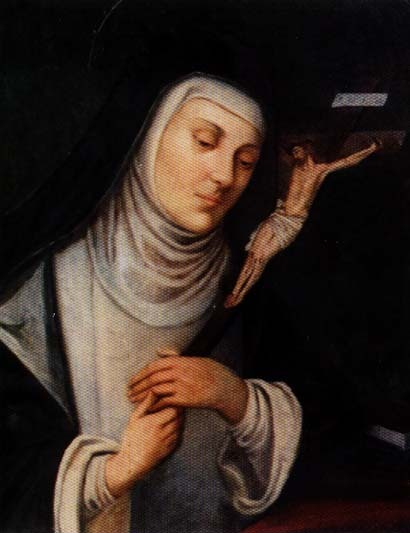
Maria Mancini

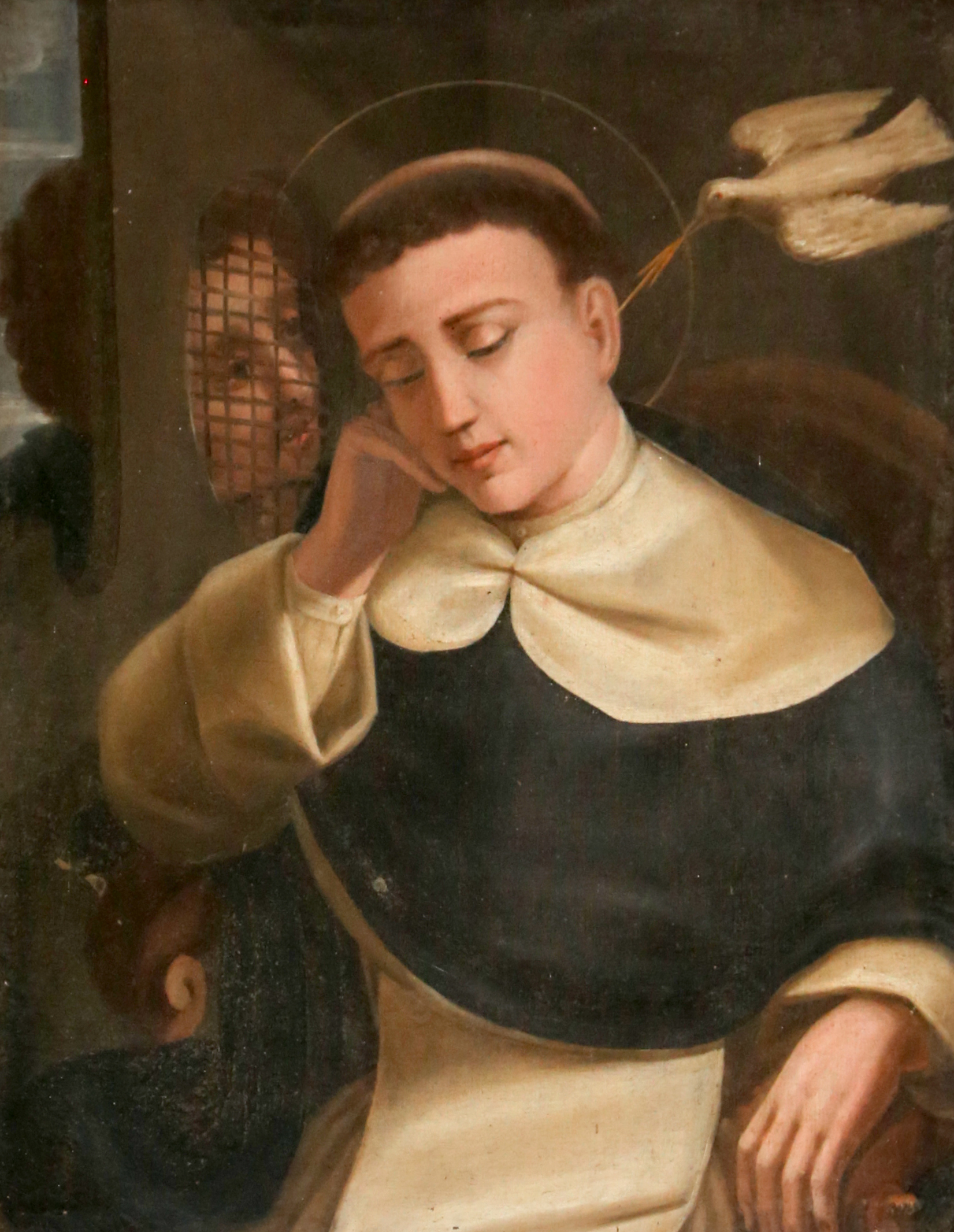
Aimone Tapparelli

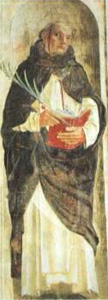
Antonio Pavoni

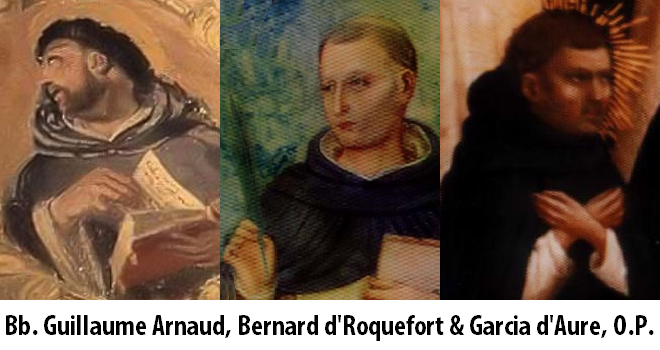
Guillaume Arnaud, Bernard d'Roquefort and Garcia d'Aure

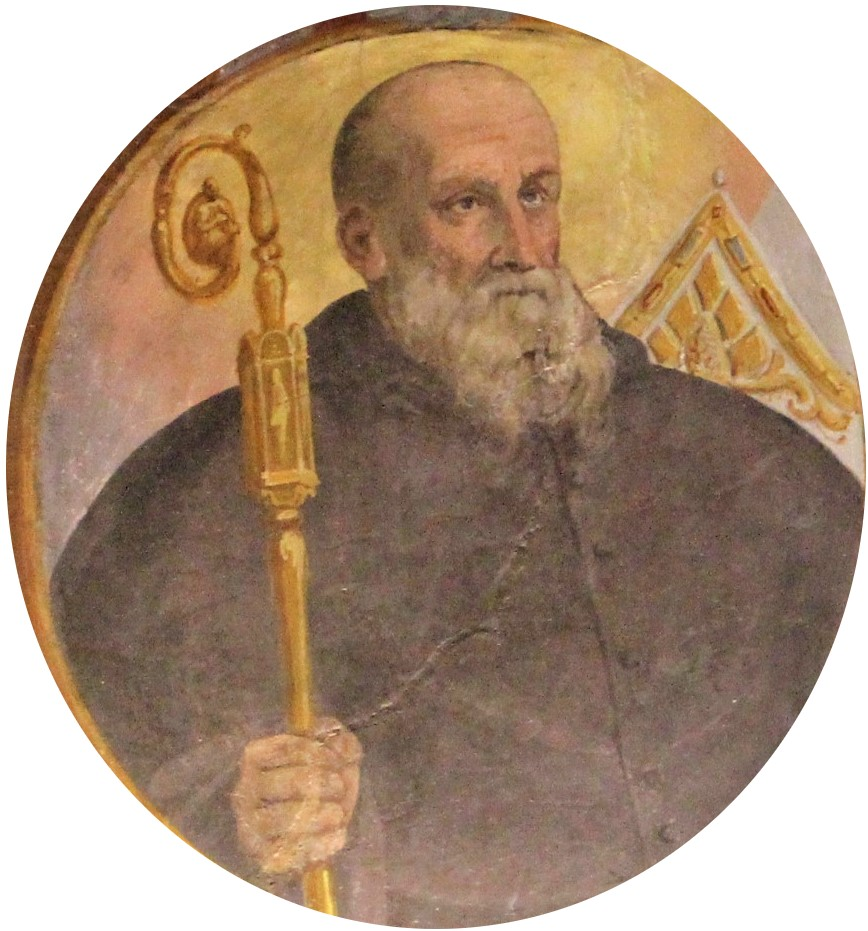
Guala de Roniis

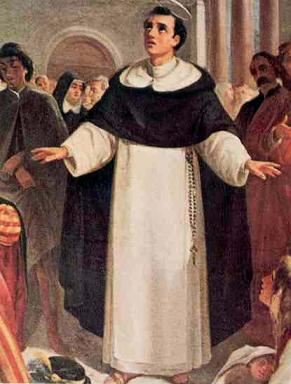
Agostino Fangi

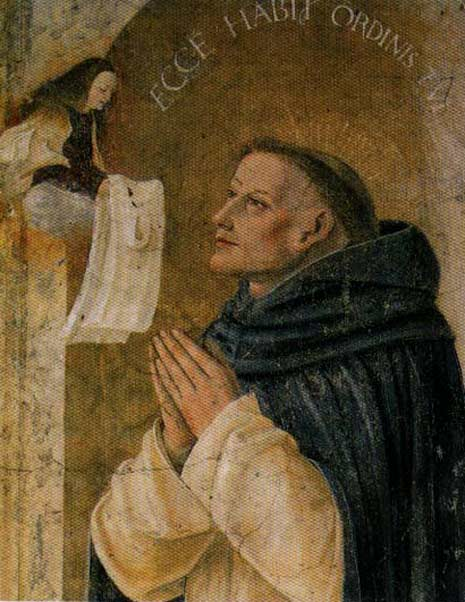
Réginald of Orleans

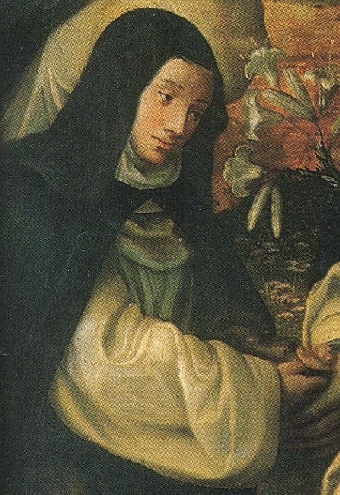
Diana degli Andalò

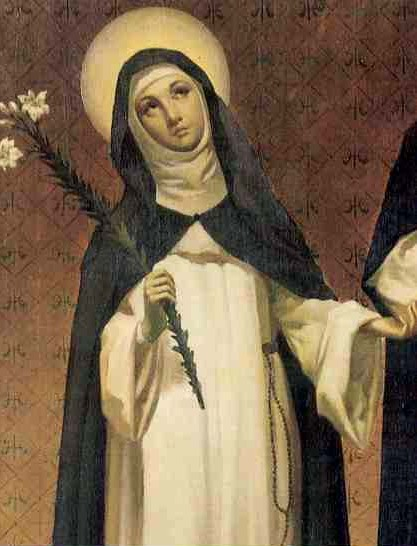
Cecilia Cesarini

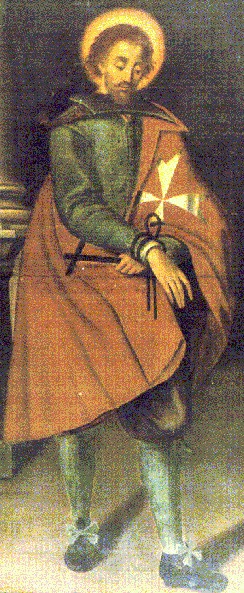
Adrian Fortescue

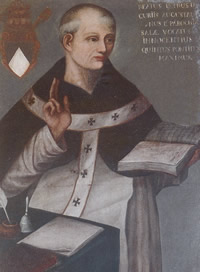
Pope Innocent V

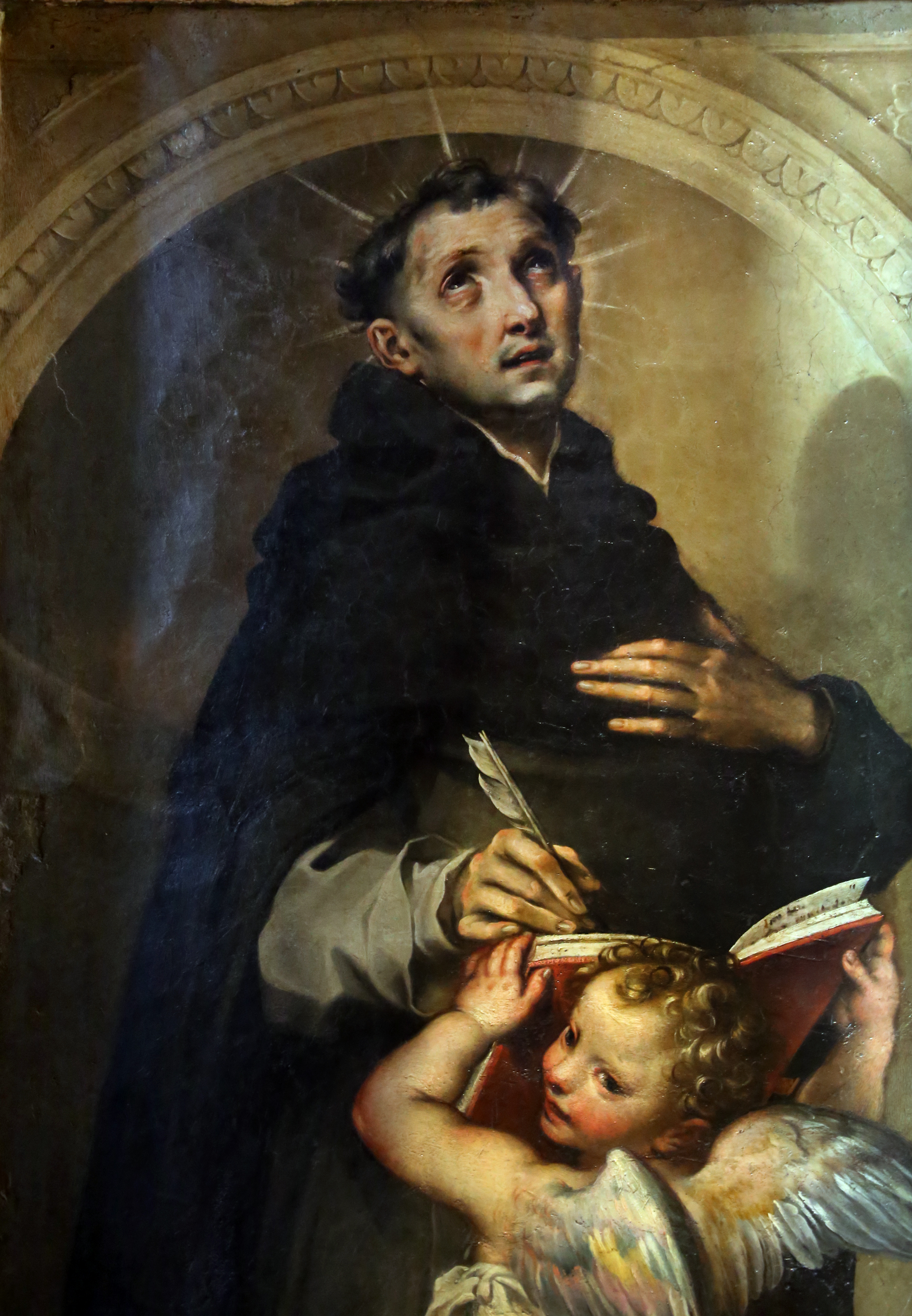
Raimondo delle Vigne

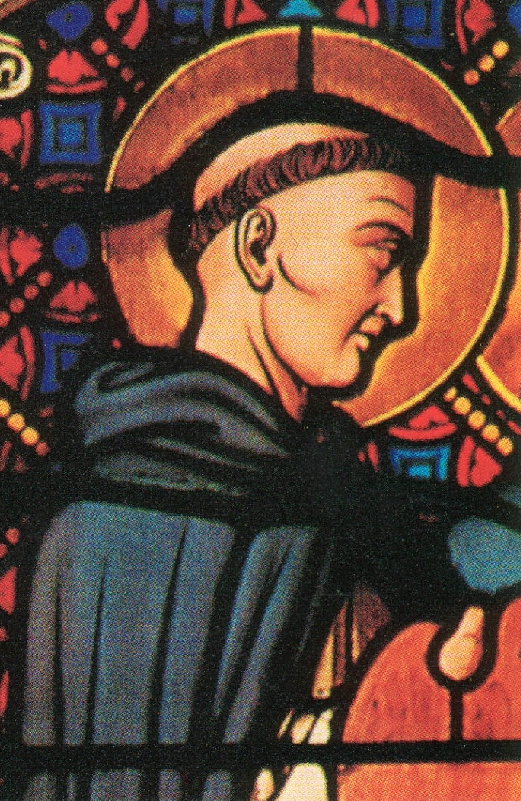
André Abellon

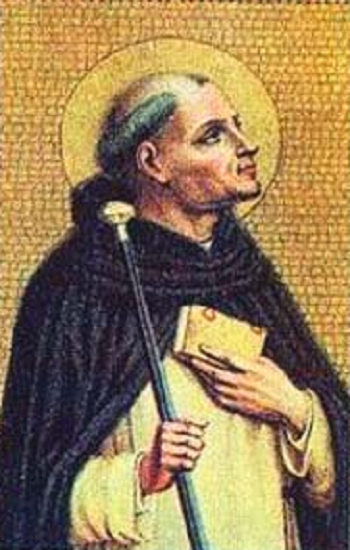
Giovanni Garbella

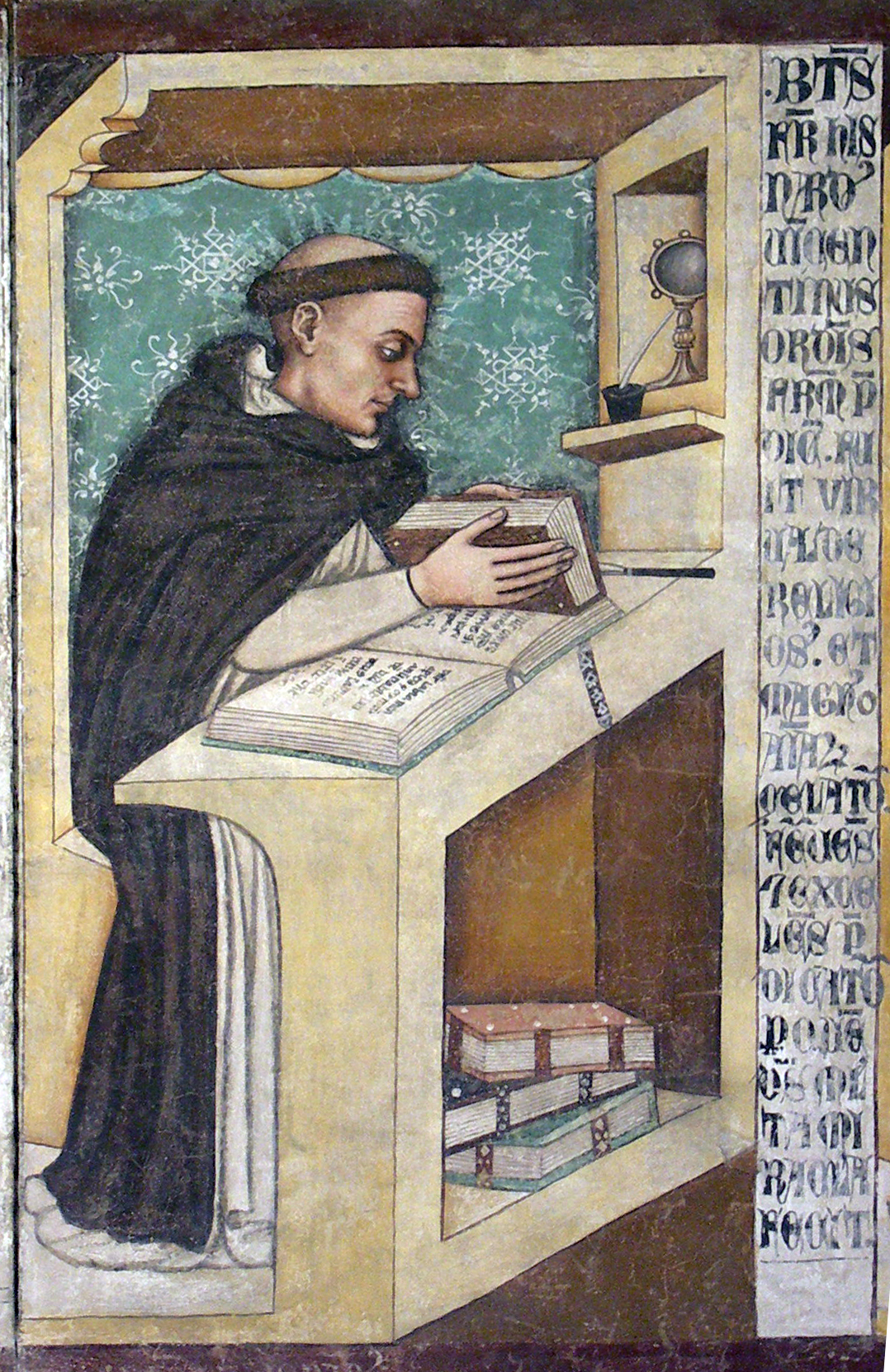
Isnardo da Chiampo
- Simone Balacchi (c. 1240–1319), Professed Religious of the Dominicans (Italy)
  - Beatified: 14 March 1820 by Pope Pius VII
- Andrea da Peschiera (Andrea Grego) (c. 1400–1485), Professed Priest of the Dominicans (Italy)
  - Beatified: 26 September 1820 by Pope Pius VII
- Costanzo da Fabriano (Constanzo Servoli) (c. 1410–1481), Professed Priest of the Dominicans (Italy)
  - Beatified: 22 September 1821 by Pope Pius VII
- Villana delle Botti (1332–1361), Layperson of the Archdiocese of Florence; Member of the Lay Dominicans (Italy)
  - Beatified: 22 March 1824 by Pope Leo XII
- Bernardo Scammacca (C. 1430–1487), Professed Priest of the Dominicans (Italy)
  - Beatified: 8 March 1825 by Pope Leo XII
- Giacomo da Ulma (Jakob Griesinger) (c. 1407–1491), Professed Religious of the Dominicans (Germany)
  - Beatified: 3 August 1825 by Pope Leo XII
- Jordan von Sachsen (c. 1185–1237), Professed Priest of the Dominicans; 2nd Master General (Germany)
  - Beatified: 10 May 1826 by Pope Leo XII
- Imelda Lambertini (c. 1320–1333), Child of the Archdiocese of Bologna (Italy)
  - Beatified: 20 December 1826 by Pope Leo XII
- Maddalena Panattieri (1443–1503), Professed Religious of the Dominican Penitent Nuns (Italy)
  - Beatified: 26 September 1927 by Pope Leo XII
- Nicola Paglia (1197–1256), Professed Priest of the Dominicans (Italy)
  - Beatified: 26 March 1828 by Pope Leo XII
- Juana de Aza de Guzmán (c. 1135–1205), Married Layperson of the Dioceses of León and Astorga (Spain), Mother of St. Dominic
  - Beatified: 1 October 1828 by Pope Leo XII
- Chiara Gambacorti (Vittoria Gambacorti) (1362–1420), Professed Religious of the Dominican Nuns (Italy)
  - Beatified: 4 March 1830 by Pope Pius VIII
- Enrico Suso (Heinrich Seuse) (1295–1366), Professed Priest of the Dominicans (Germany)
  - Beatified: 22 April 1831 by Pope Gregory XVI
- Giovanni Dominici (1356–1419), Professed Priest of the Dominicans; Apostolic Administrator of Bova (Italy)
  - Beatified: 9 April 1832 by Pope Gregory XVI
- Giordano da Pisa (c. 1255–1311), Professed Priest of the Dominicans (Italy)
  - Beatified: 23 August 1833 by Pope Gregory XVI
- Manés de Guzmán (c. 1170–1236), Professed Priest of the Dominicans (Spain), brother of St. Dominic
  - Beatified: 2 June 1834 by Pope Gregory XVI
- Damiano da Finale (Damiano dei Furceri) (d.1484), Professed Priest of the Dominicans (Italy)
  - Beatified: 4 April 1851 by Pope Pius IX
- Lorenzo da Ripafratta (1373–1456), Professed Religious of the Dominicans (Italy)
  - Beatified: 4 April 1851 by Pope Pius IX
- Bartolomeo Cerveri (1420–1466), Professed Priest of the Dominicans; Martyr in odium fidei (Italy)
  - Beatified: 22 September 1853 by Pope Pius IX
- Gregorio y Domingo de Aragon (fl. 14th century), Professed Priests of the Dominicans (Spain)
  - Beatified: 17 August 1854 by Pope Pius IX
- Sibillina Biscossi (1287–1367), Layperson of the Diocese of Pavia; Member of the Lay Dominicans (Italy)
  - Beatified: 17 August 1854 by Pope Pius IX
- Caterina Mancini (rel. name: Maria) (1355–1431), Professed Religious of the Dominican Nuns (Italy)
  - Beatified: 2 August 1855 by Pope Pius IX
- Stefano Bandelli (1369–1450), Professed Priest of the Dominicans (Italy)
  - Beatified: 21 February 1856 by Pope Pius IX
- Aimone Taparelli (1395–1495), Professed Priest of the Dominicans (Italy)
  - Beatified: 29 May 1856 by Pope Pius IX
- Antonio Pavoni (c. 1325–1374), Professed Priest of the Dominicans; Martyr in odium fidei (Italy)
  - Beatified: 4 December 1856 by Pope Pius IX
- Pietro da Ruffia (Pietro Cambiani) (1320–1365), Professed Priest of the Dominicans (Italy)
  - Beatified: 4 December 1856 by Pope Pius IX
- Marco da Modena (Marco Scalabrini) (d. 1498), Professed Priest of the Dominicans (Italy)
  - Beatified: 10 September 1857 by Pope Pius IX
- Giacomo da Mantova (Giacomo Benfatti) (c. 1250–1332), Professed Priest of the Dominicans; Bishop of Mantua (Italy)
  - Beatified: 22 September 1859 by Pope Pius IX
- Guillaume Arnaud (d. 1242), Garcia d'Aure (d. 1242) and Bernard de Roquefort (d. 1242), Professed Priests and Religious of the Dominicans; Martyrs in odium fidei (France)
  - Beatified: 6 September 1866 by Pope Pius IX
- Guala de Roniis (1180–1244), Professed Priest of the Dominicans; Bishop of Brescia (Italy)
  - Beatified: 1 October 1868 by Pope Pius IX
- Agostino da Biella (Agostino Fangi) (c. 1430–1493), Professed Priest of the Dominicans (Italy)
  - Beatified: 5 September 1872 by Pope Pius IX
- Réginald of Orleans (c. 1180–1220), Professed Priest of the Dominicans (France)
  - Beatified: 15 February 1877 by Pope Pius IX
- Bertrand de Garrigues (c. 1195–1230), Professed Priest of the Dominicans (France)
  - Beatified: 14 July 1881 by Pope Leo XIII
- Diana degli Andalò (1201–1236), Professed Religious of the Dominican Nuns (Italy)
  - Beatified: 8 August 1888 by Pope Leo XIII
- Cecilia Cesarini (1203–1290), Professed Religious of the Dominican Nuns (Italy)
  - Beatified: 24 December 1891 by Pope Leo XIII
- Amata da Bologna (d. 1270), Professed Religious of the Dominican Nuns (Italy)
  - Beatified: 24 December 1891 by Pope Leo XIII
- Adrian Fortescue (c. 1480–1539), Married Layperson of the Archdiocese of Westminster; Member of the Lay Dominicans and Knights of Saint John of Jerusalem (United Kingdom)
  - Beatified: 13 May 1895 by Pope Leo XIII
- Pope Innocent V (Pierre de Tarentaise) (c. 1225–1276), Professed Priest of the Dominicans; Pope (Italy)
  - Beatified: 14 March 1898 by Pope Leo XIII
- Raimondo da Capua (Raimondo delle Vigne) (c. 1330–1399), Professed Priest of the Dominicans; 23rd Master General (Italy)
  - Beatified: 15 May 1899 by Pope Leo XIII
- André Abellon (1375–1450), Professed Priest of the Dominicans (France)
  - Beatified: 19 August 1902 by Pope Leo XIII
- Giovanni da Vercelli (Giovanni Garbella) (c. 1205–1283), Professed Priest of the Dominicans; 6th Master General (Italy)
  - Beatified: 7 September 1903 by Pope Pius X
- Christina von Stommeln (1242–1312), Layperson of the Archdiocese of Cologne (Germany)
  - Beatified: 12 August 1908 by Pope Pius X
- Isnardo da Chiampo (d. 1244), Professed Priest of the Dominicans (Italy)
  - Beatified: 12 March 1919 by Pope Benedict XV
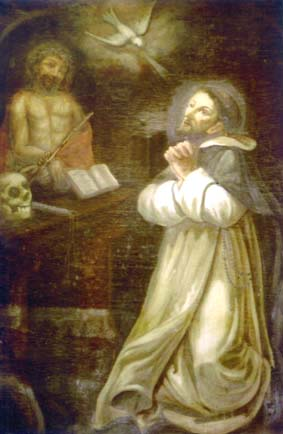
Domenico Spadafora

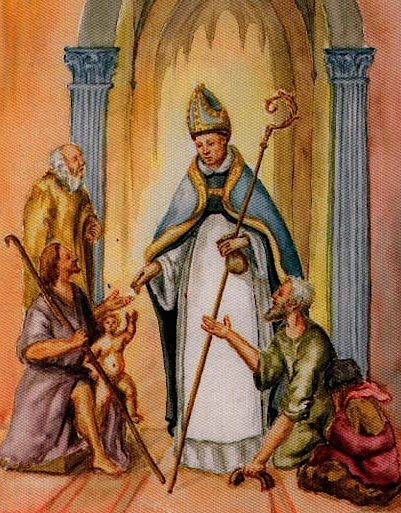
Andrea Franchi

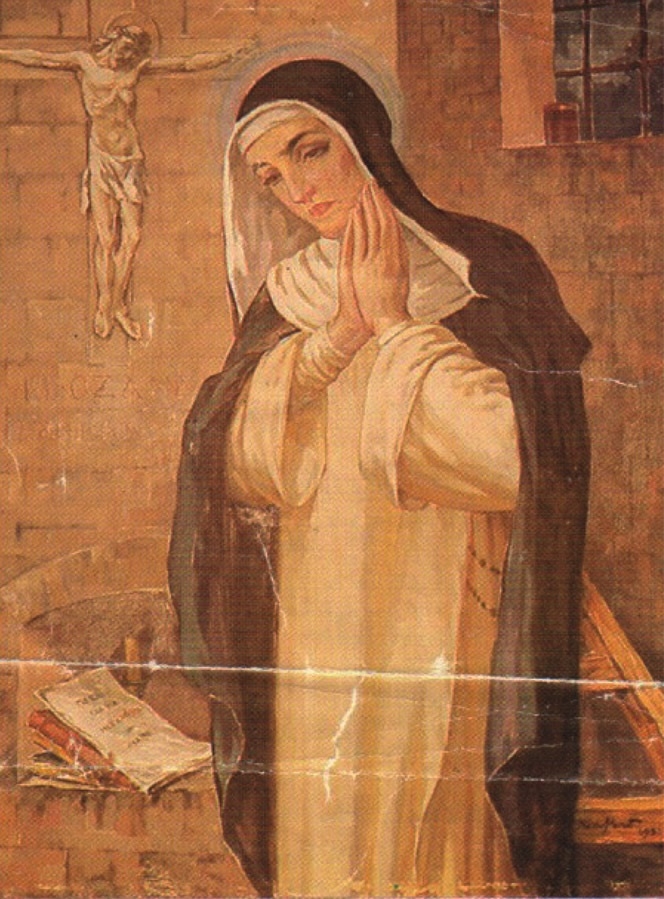
Ozana Kosić

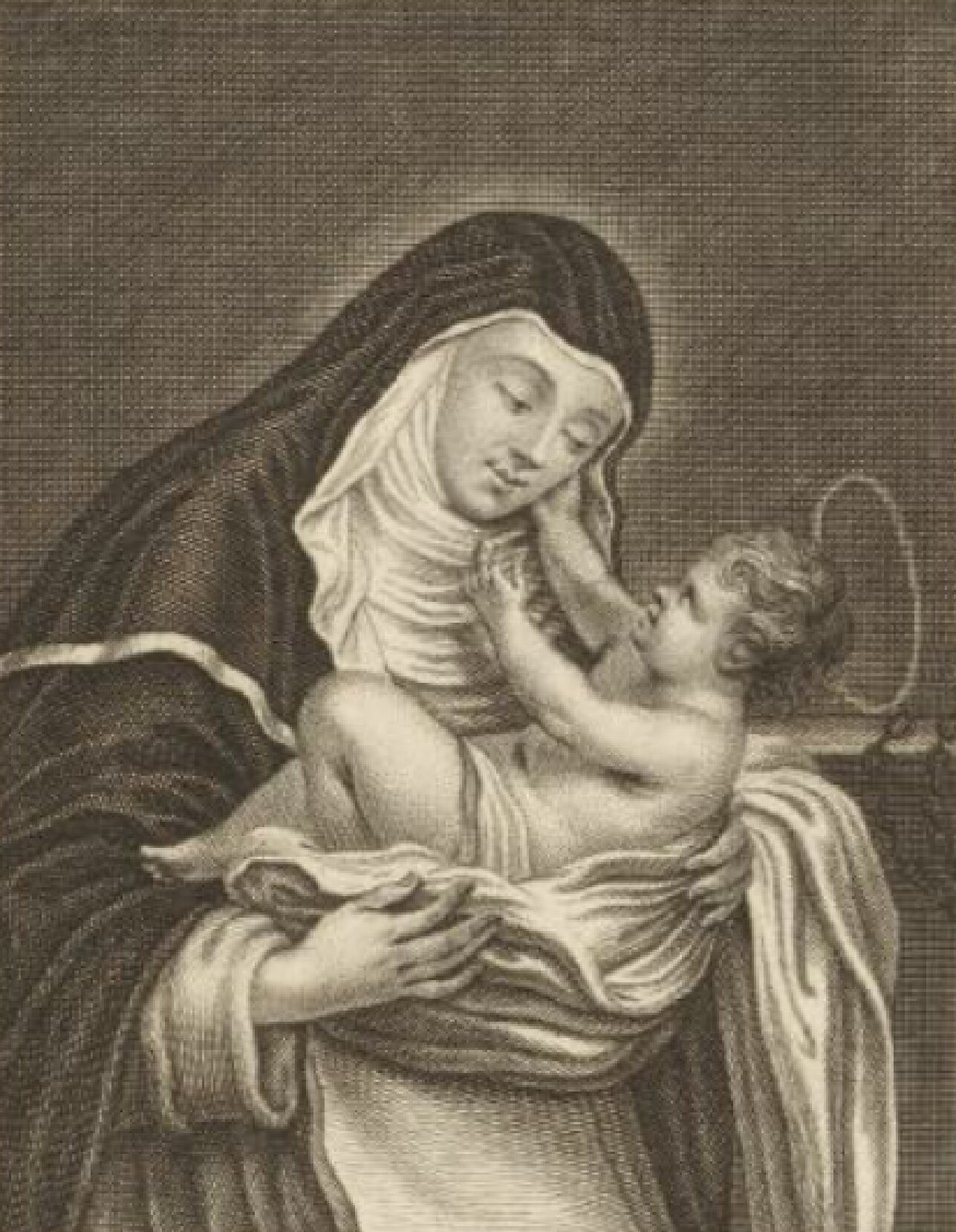
Margareta Ebner

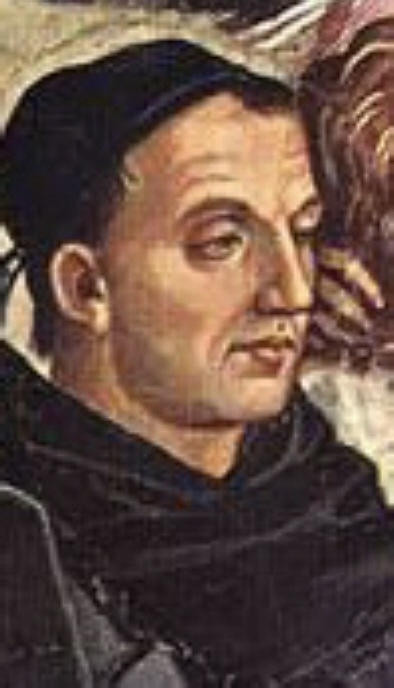
Giovanni da Fiesole

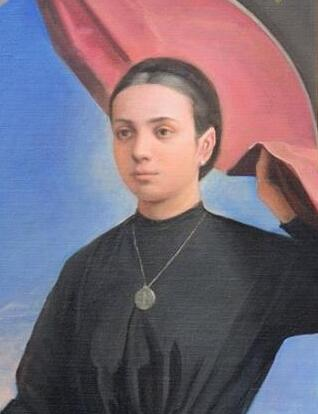
Savina Petrilli

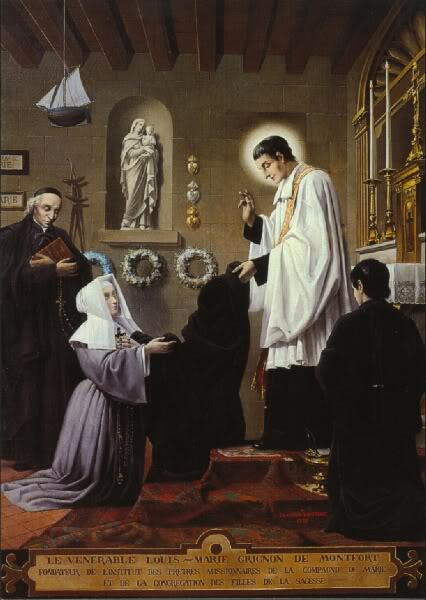
Marie Louise Trichet and St. Louis de Montfort

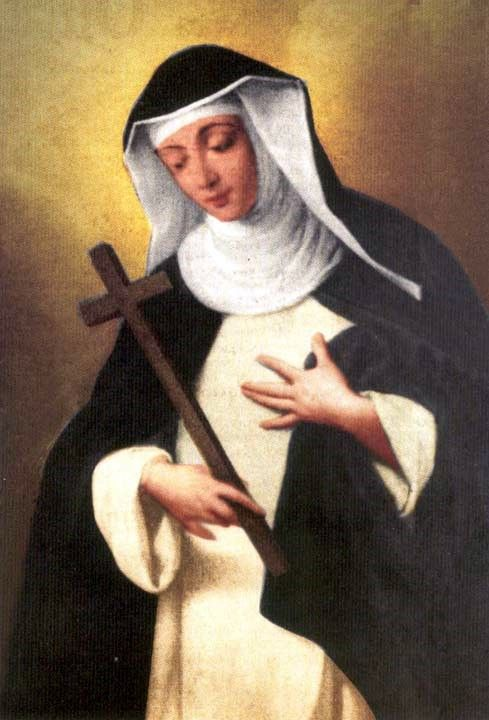
Agnès Galand

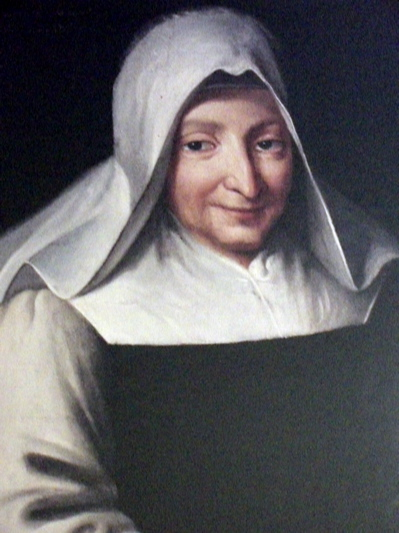
Marie Poussepin

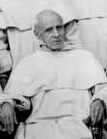
Hyacinthe-Marie Cormier

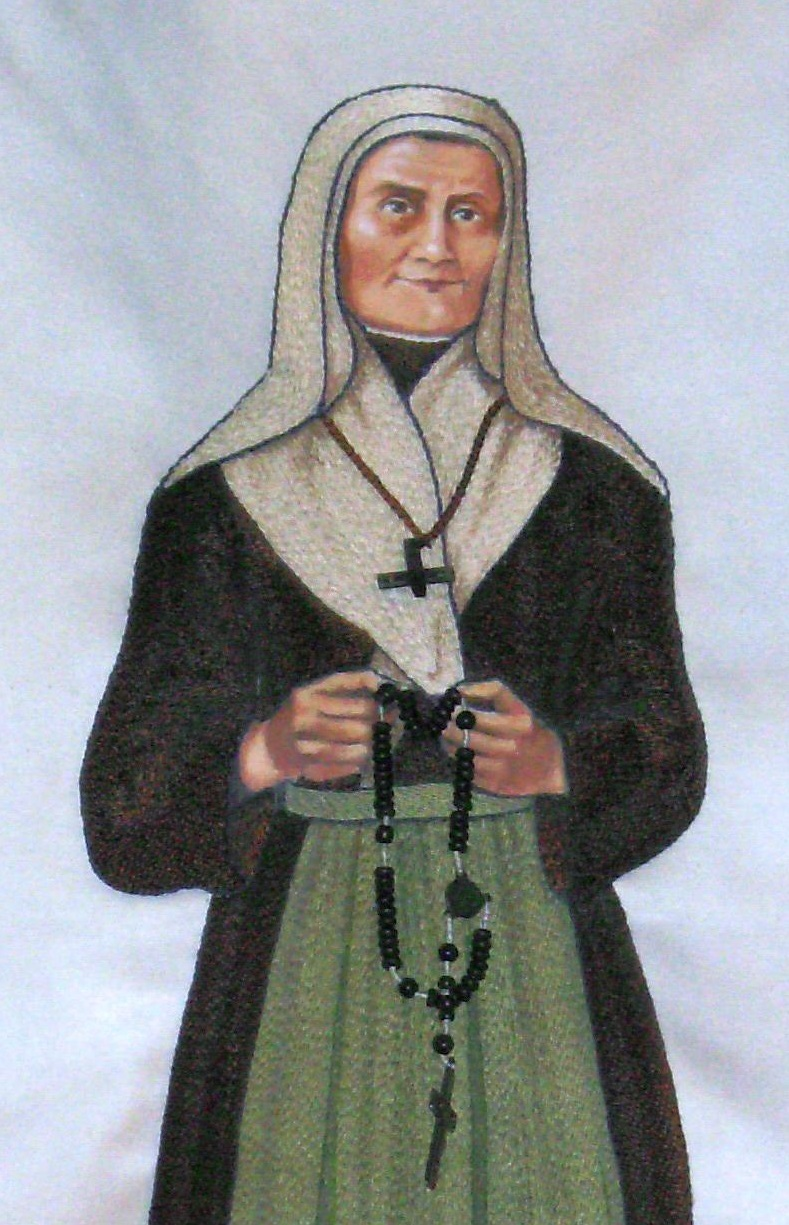
Catherine Jarrige

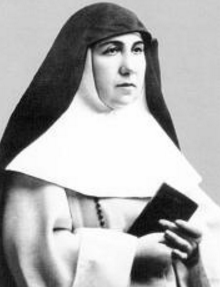
María Ascensión Nicol Goñi

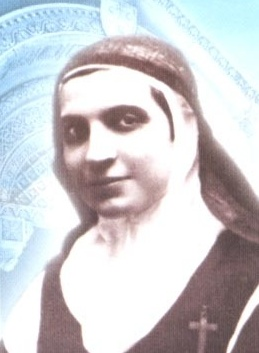
Elia of Saint Clement

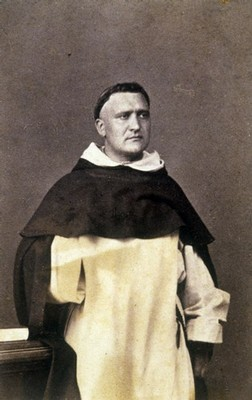
Alcide-Vital Lataste

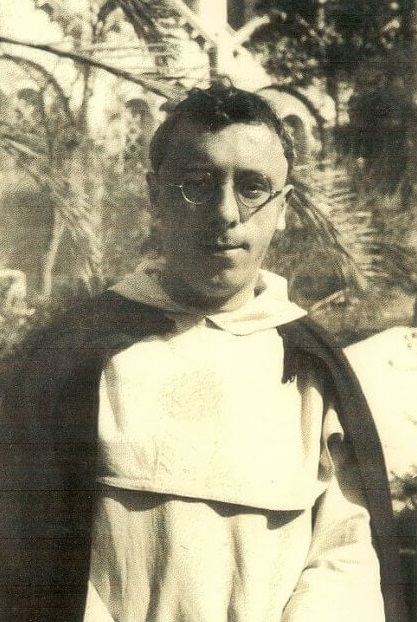
Giuseppe Girotti

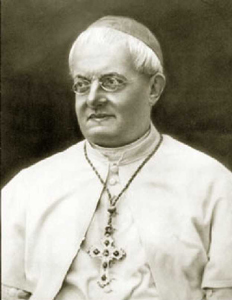
Pio Alberto del Corona

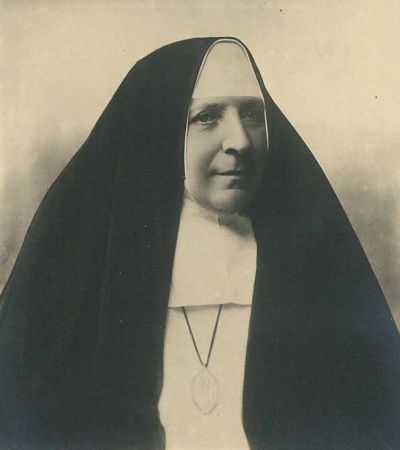
Clara Fey

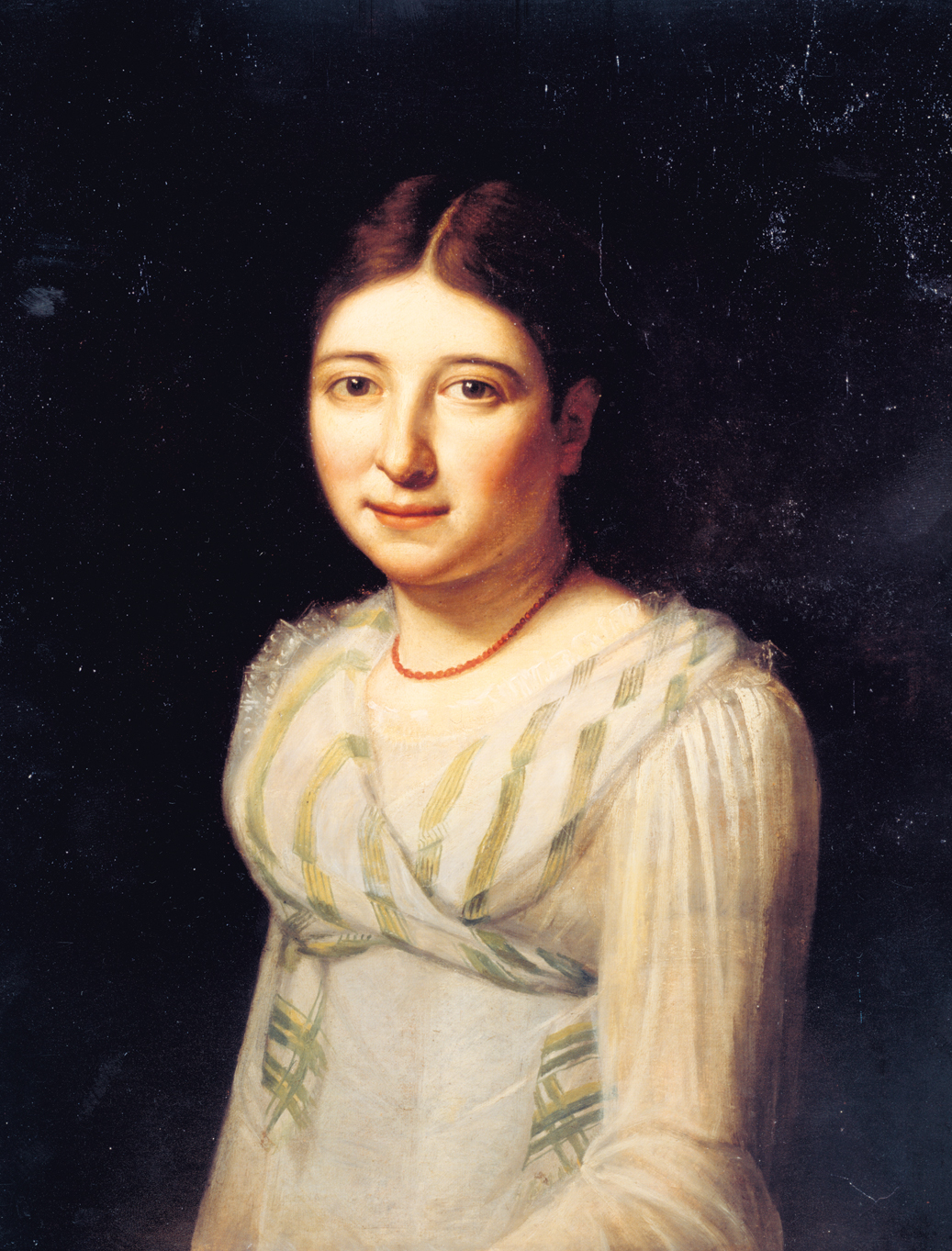
Pauline Jaricot

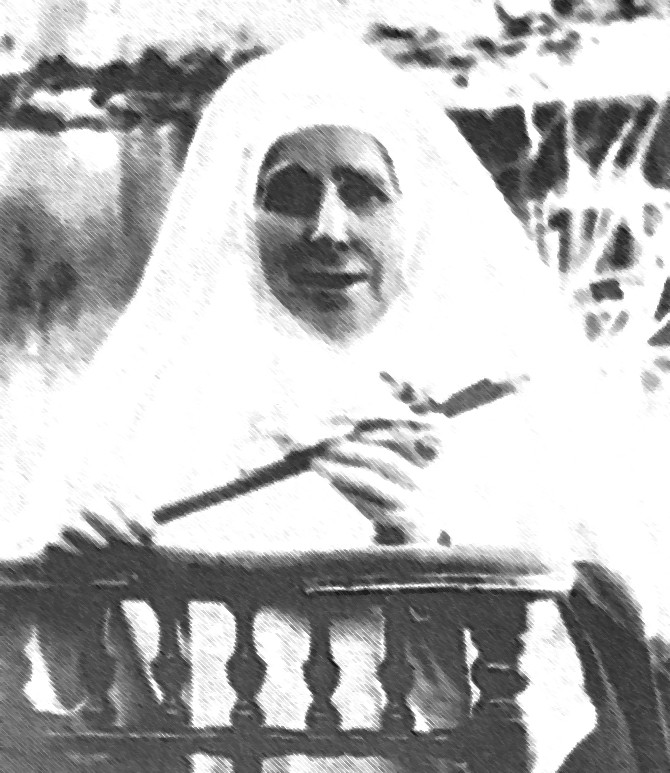
Asunción Sánchez Romero

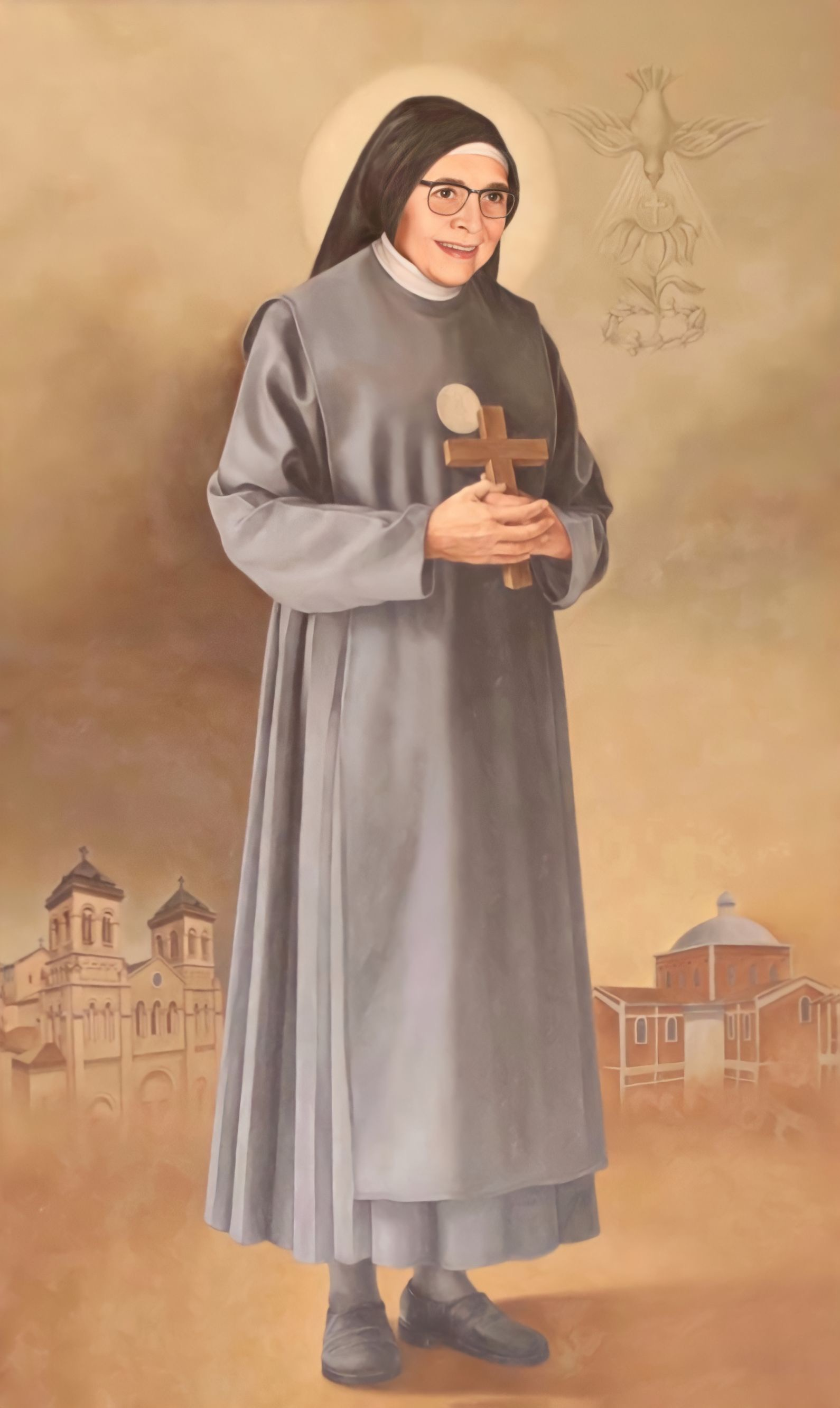
Maria Berenice Duque
- Domenico Spadafora (c. 1450–1521), Professed Priest of the Dominicans (Italy)
  - Beatified: 12 January 1921 by Pope Benedict XV
- Andrea Franchi (1335–1401), Professed Priest of the Dominicans; Bishop of Pistoia (Italy)
  - Beatified: 23 November 1921 by Pope Benedict XV
- Osanna da Cattaro (Ozana Kosić) (1493–1565), Layperson of the Diocese of Kotor; Member of the Lay Dominicans (Serbia–Italy)
  - Beatified: 21 December 1927 by Pope Pius XI
- Margareta Ebner (c. 1291–1351), Professed Religious of the Dominican Nuns (Germany)
  - Beatified: 24 February 1979 by Pope John Paul II
- Giovanni da Fiesole (Fra Angelico) (c. 1400–1455), Professed Priest of the Dominicans (Italy)
  - Beatified: 3 October 1982 by Pope John Paul II
- Ana Monteagudo Ponce de Leon (rel. name: Ana of the Angels) (1602–1686), Professed Religious of the Dominican Nuns (Peru)
  - Declared "Venerable": 23 May 1975
  - Beatified: 2 February 1985 by Pope John Paul II
- Robert Nutter [Askew] (c. 1557–1600), Professed Priest of the Dominicans; Martyr in odium fidei (United Kingdom)
  - Declared "Venerable": 10 November 1986
  - Beatified: 22 November 1987 by Pope John Paul II
- Savina Petrilli (1851–1923), Founder of the Sisters of the Poor of Saint Catherine of Siena (Italy)
  - Declared "Venerable": 16 November 1985
  - Beatified: 24 April 1988 by Pope John Paul II
- Marie Louise Trichet (1684–1759), Founder of the Daughters of Wisdom (France)
  - Declared "Venerable": 10 July 1990
  - Beatified: 16 May 1993 by Pope John Paul II
- Agnès Galand (rel. name: Agnès of Jesus) (1602–1634), Professed Religious of the Dominican Nuns (France)
  - Declared "Venerable": 19 March 1988
  - Beatified: 20 November 1994 by Pope John Paul II
- Marie Poussepin (1653–1744), Founder of the Dominican Sisters of Charity of the Presentation (France)
  - Declared "Venerable": 21 December 1991
  - Beatified: 20 November 1994 by Pope John Paul II
- Hyacinthe-Marie Cormier (1832–1916), Professed Priest of the Dominicans; 76th Master General; Founder of the Dominican Sisters of Saint Catherine of Siena of Auch (France)
  - Declared "Venerable": 14 May 1983
  - Beatified: 20 November 1994
- Jean-Georges Rehm (rel. name: Thomas) (1752–1794), Professed Priest of the Dominicans; Martyr in odium fidei (France)
  - Declared "Venerable": 2 July 1994
  - Beatified: 1 October 1995 by Pope John Paul II
- Catherine Jarrige (1754–1836), Layperson of the Diocese of Saint-Flour; Member of the Lay Dominicans (France)
  - Declared "Venerable": 16 January 1953
  - Beatified: 24 November 1996 by Pope John Paul II
- Florentina Nicol Goñi (rel. name: María Ascensión of the Heart of Jesus) (1868–1940), Cofounder of the Missionary Dominican Sisters of the Rosary (Spain)
  - Declared "Venerable": 12 April 2003
  - Beatified: 14 May 2005 by Pope Benedict XVI
- Teodora Fracasso (rel. name: Elia of Saint Clement) (1901–1927), Professed Religious of the Discalced Carmelite Nuns (formerly a member of the Lay Dominicans) (Italy)
  - Declared "Venerable": 11 December 1987
  - Beatified: 18 March 2006 by Cardinal José Saraiva Martins, C.M.F.
- Jean-Joseph (Alcide-Vital) Lataste (1832–1869), Professed Priest of the Dominicans; Founder of the Dominican Sisters of Bethany (France)
  - Declared "Venerable": 1 June 2007
  - Beatified: 3 June 2012 by Cardinal Angelo Amato, S.D.B.
- Giuseppe Girotti (1905–1945), Professed Priest of the Dominicans; Martyr in odium fidei (Italy–Germany)
  - Declared "Venerable": 27 March 2013
  - Beatified: 26 April 2014 by Cardinal Severino Poletto
- Pio (Alberto) del Corona (1837–1912), Professed Priest of the Dominicans; Bishop of San Miniato; Founder of the Dominican Sisters of the Holy Spirit (Italy)
  - Declared "Venerable": 9 October 2013
  - Beatified: 19 September 2015 by Cardinal Angelo Amato, S.D.B.
- Clara Fey (1815–1894), Founder of the Sisters of the Poor Child Jesus (Germany – Netherlands)
  - Declared "Venerated": 14 May 1991
  - Beatified: 5 May 2018 by Cardinal Angelo Amato, S.D.B.
- Pierre-Lucien Claverie (1938–1996), Professed Priest of the Dominicans; Bishop of Oran; Martyr in odium fidei (Algeria)
  - Declared "Venerable": 26 January 2018
  - Beatified: 8 December 2018 by Cardinal Giovanni Angelo Becciu
- Pauline-Marie Jaricot (1799–1862), Layperson of the Archdiocese of Lyon; Member of the Lay Dominicans; Founder of the Society for the Propagation of the Faith and Living Rosary Association (France)
  - Declared "Venerable": 25 February 1963
  - Beatified: 22 May 2022 by Cardinal Luis Antonio Tagle
- Isabel Sánchez Romero (rel. name: Asunción of Saint Joseph) (1861–1937), Professed Religious of the Dominican Nuns; Martyr in odium fidei (Spain)
  - Declared "Venerable": 11 December 2019
  - Beatified: 18 June 2022 by Cardinal Marcello Semeraro
- Ana Julia Duque Hencker (rel. name: María Berenice) (1898–1993), Founder of the Little Sisters of the Annunciation and the Missionaries of the Annunciation (Colombia)
  - Declared "Venerable": 12 February 2019
  - Beatified: 29 October 2022 by Cardinal Marcello Semeraro

== Venerables ==
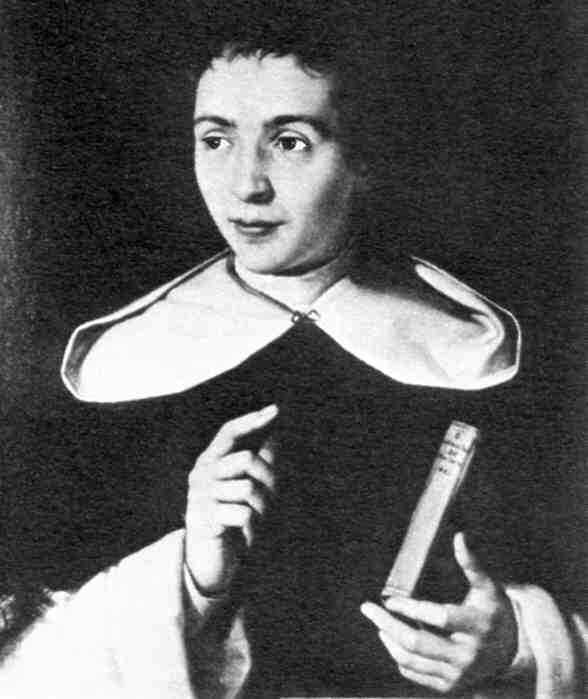
Carlo Samuele Mazzuchelli

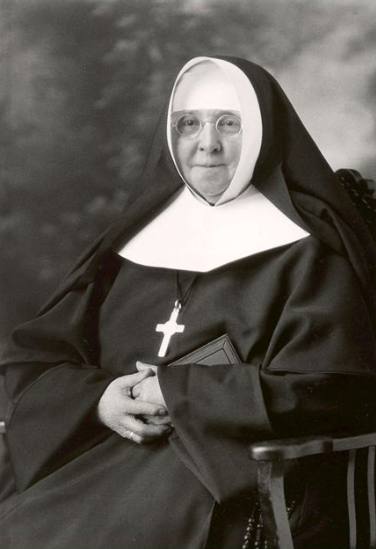
Élisabeth Bergeron

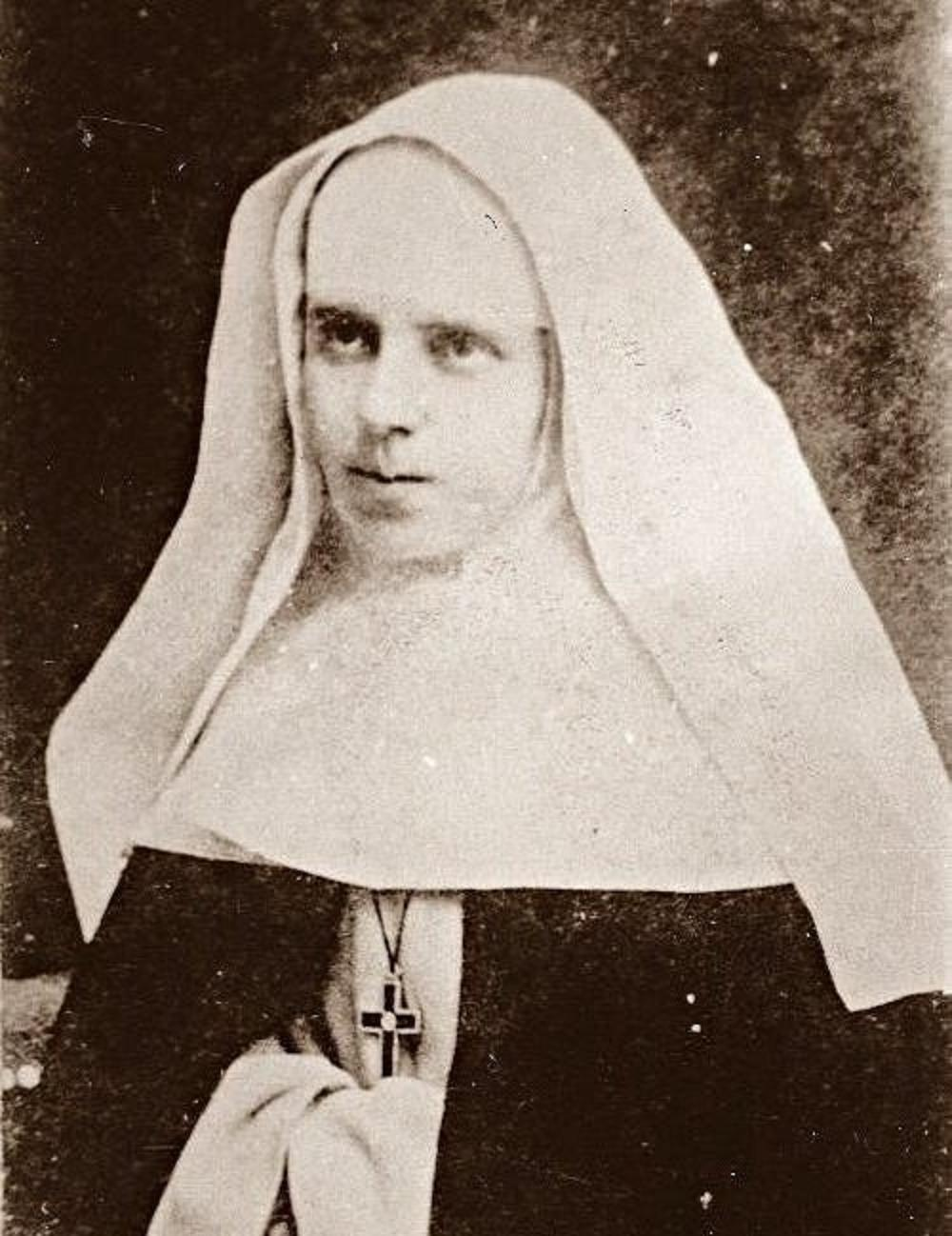
Róża Kolumba Białecka

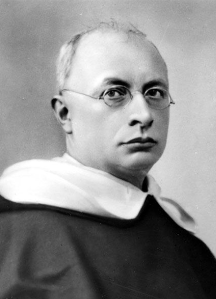
Giocondo Pio Lorgna

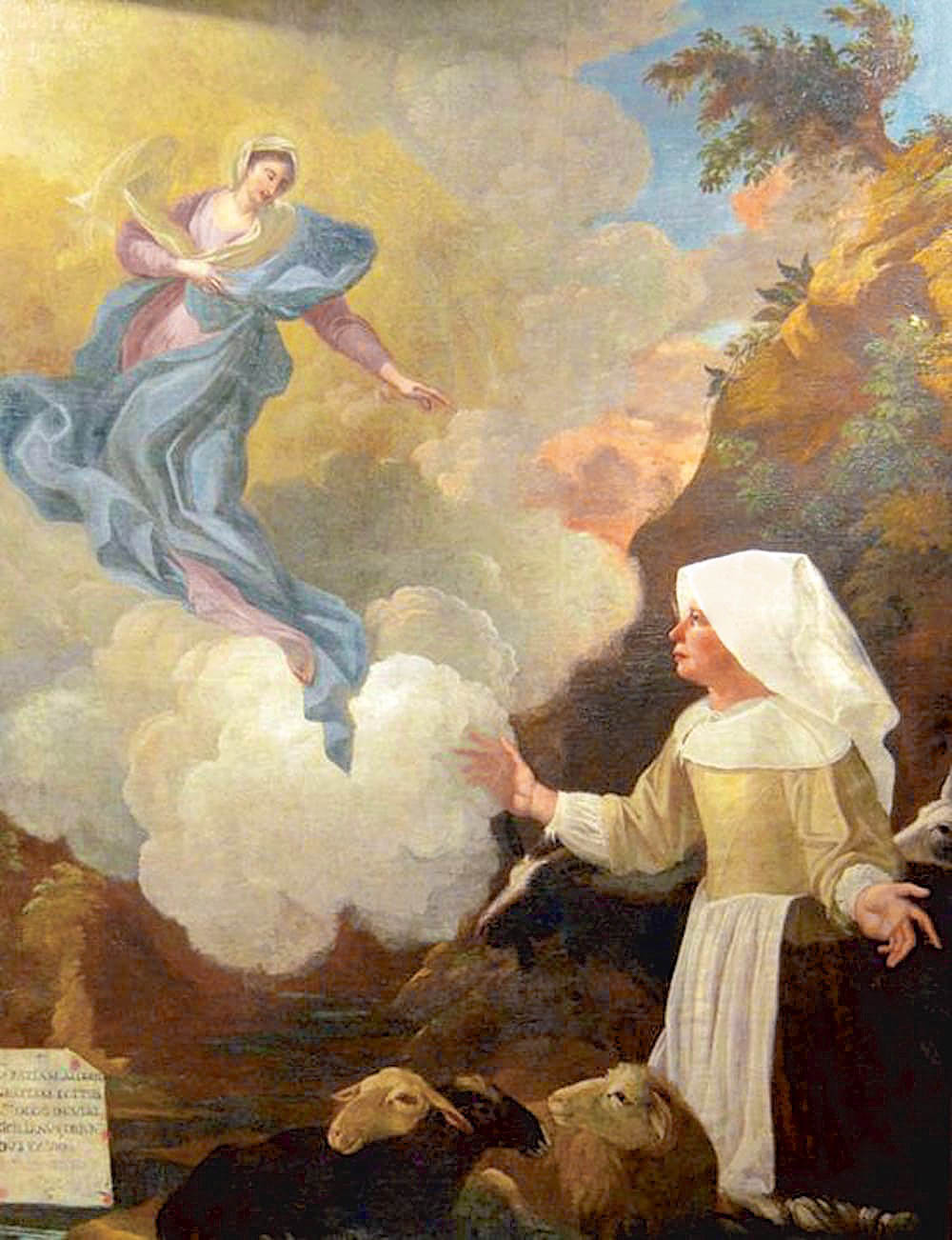
Benoîte Rencurel

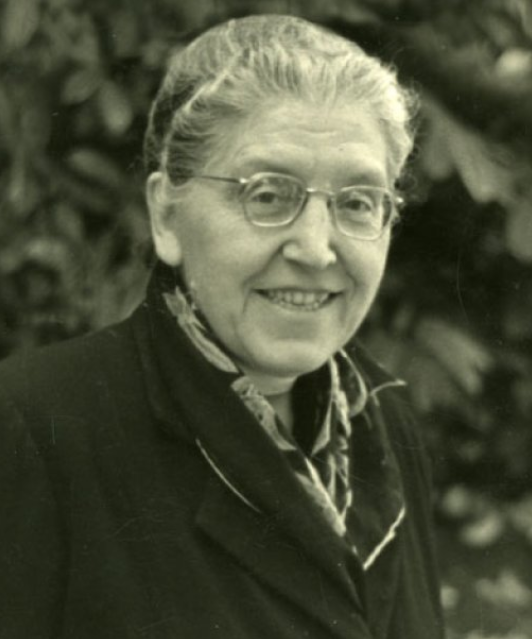
Luigia Tincani

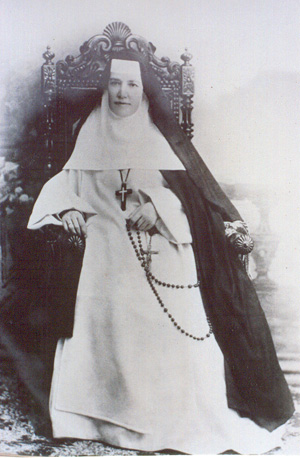
Teresa de Saldanha

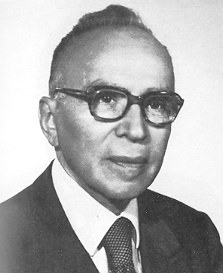
Giorgio La Pira

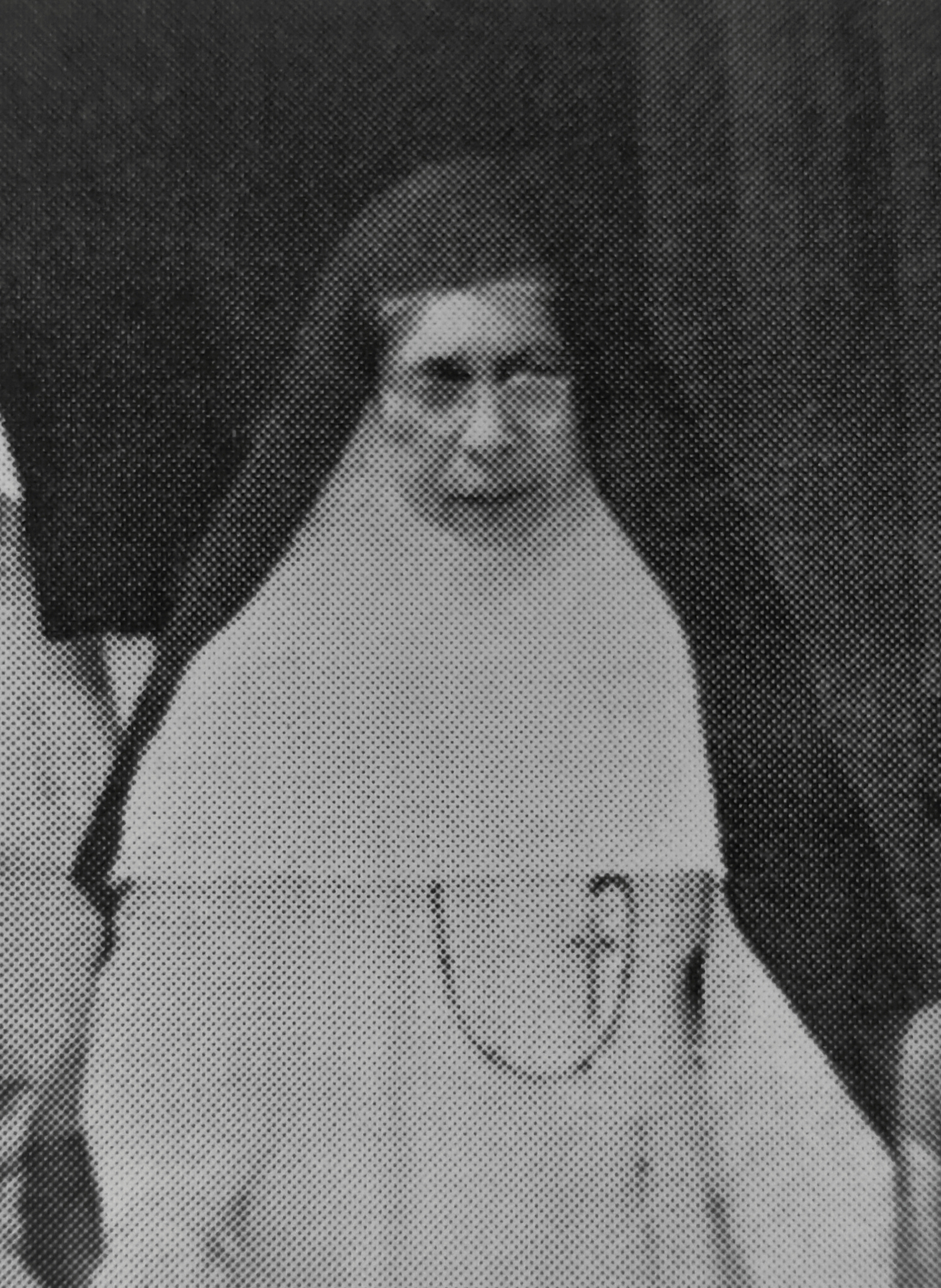
María Beatriz del Rosario Arroyo

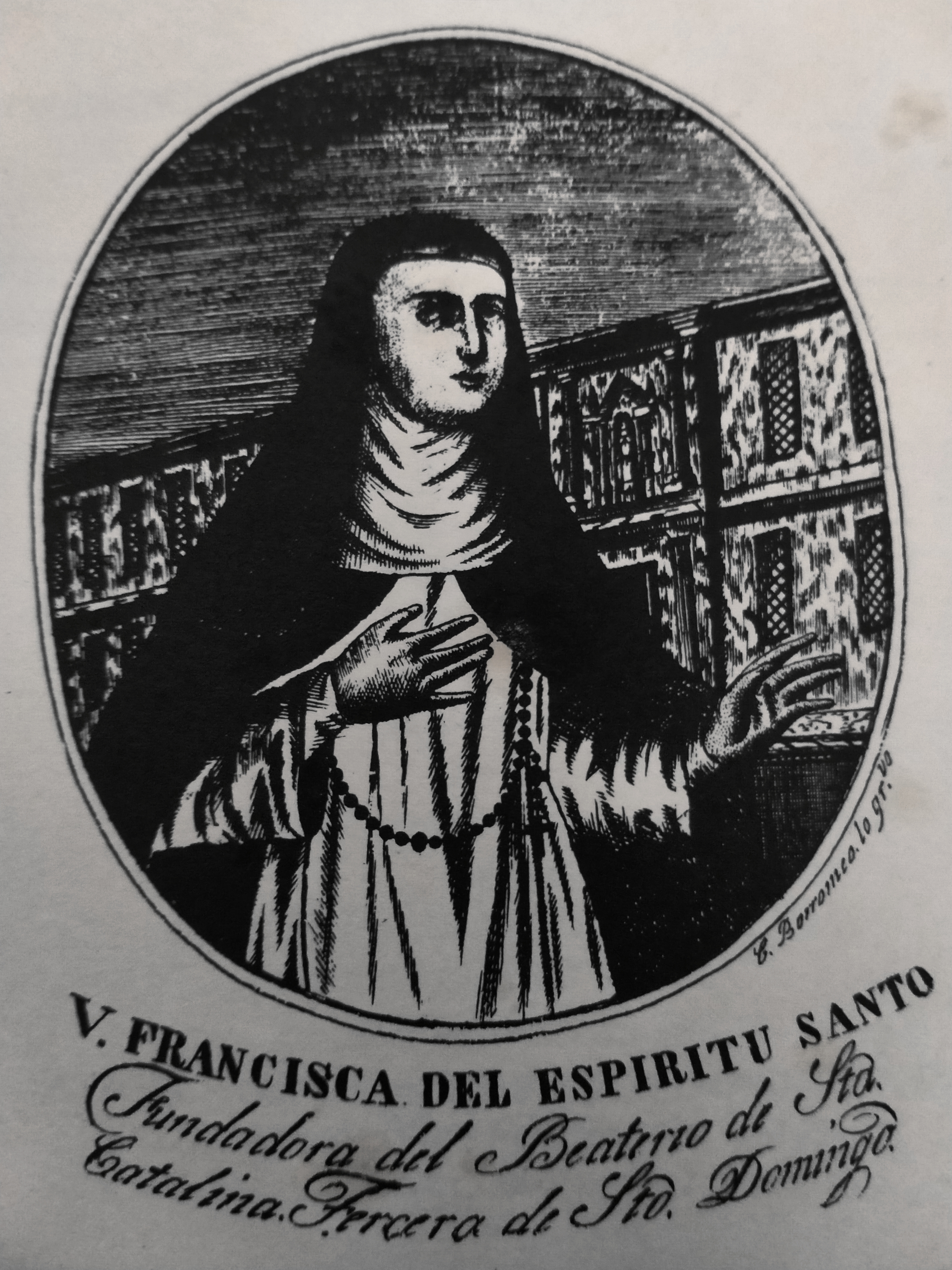
Francisca del Espiritu Santo Fuentes

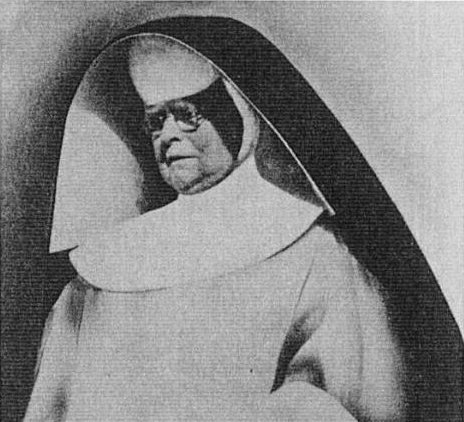
Rose Hawthorne Lathrop
- Maria Geltrude Salandri (1690–1748), Professed Religious of the Dominican Nuns (Italy)
  - Declared "Venerable": 10 February 1884
- Placido Baccher (1781–1851), Priest of the Archdiocese of Naples; Member of the Dominican Fraternity of Priests (Italy)
  - Declared "Venerable": 27 February 1944
- Martín Bernedo Albistur (rel. name: Vicente) (1562–1619), Professed Priest of the Dominicans (Spain–Bolivia)
  - Declared "Venerable": 22 January 1991
- Carlo Samuele Mazzuchelli (1806–1864), Professed Priest of the Dominicans; Founder of the Dominican Sisters of the Congregation of the Most Holy Rosary of Sinsinawa (Italy–United States)
  - Declared "Venerable": 6 July 1993
- Isabel Tejada Cuartas (rel. name: María of Perpetual Help) (1887–1925), Professed Religious of the Missionary Sisters of the Immaculate Virgin Mary and Saint Catherine of Siena (Colombia)
  - Declared "Venerable": 26 March 1994
- Élisabeth Bergeron (rel. name: Mére Saint-Joseph) (1851–1936), Founder of the Sisters of Saint Joseph of Saint-Hyacinthe (Canada)
  - Declared "Venerable": 12 January 1996
- Franz Horten (rel. name: Titus) (1882–1936), Professed Priest of the Dominicans (Germany)
  - Declared "Venerable": 20 December 2004
- Róża Filipina Białecka (rel. name: Maria Kolumba) (1838–1887), Founder of the Sisters of Saint Dominic (Dominican Sisters of Poland) (Poland)
  - Declared "Venerable": 20 December 2004
- Giocondo Pio Lorgna (1870–1928), Professed Priest of the Dominicans; Founder of the Dominican Sisters of Blessed Imelda (Italy)
  - Declared "Venerable": 15 March 2008
- Benoîte Rencurel (1647–1718), Layperson of the Diocese of Gap; Member of the Lay Dominicans (France)
  - Declared "Venerable": 3 April 2009
- Felisa Pérez de Iriarte Casado (rel. name: Teresita of the Child Jesus) (1904–1954), Professed Religious of the Dominican Nuns (Spain)
  - Declared "Venerable": 3 April 2009
- Antonio Palladino (1881–1926), Priest of the Diocese of Cerignola-Ascoli Satriano; Founder of the Dominican Sisters of the Blessed Sacrament (Italy)
  - Declared "Venerable": 10 December 2010
- Luigia Tincani (1889–1925), Founder of the Union of Saint Catherine of Siena of the Missionaries of the School (Italy)
  - Declared "Venerable": 27 June 2011
- Práxedes Fernández García de Fernández (1886–1936), Married Layperson of the Diocese of Oviedo; Member of the Lay Dominicans (Spain)
  - Declared "Venerable": 6 December 2014
- Rachele Lalìa (rel. name: Maria Antonia of the Sacred Heart of Jesus) (1839–1914), Founder of the Dominican Sisters of San Sisto (Italy)
  - Declared "Venerable": 5 June 2015
- Teresa Rosa Fernanda de Saldanha Oliveira Sousa (1837–1916), Founder of the Dominican Sisters of the Portuguese Congregation of Saint Catherine of Siena (Portugal)
  - Declared "Venerable": 14 December 2015
- Maria Antonietta Bordoni (1916–1978), Layperson of the Diocese of Albano Laziale; Founder of the Little Work "Mater Dei" (Italy)
  - Declared "Venerable": 6 March 2018
- Isora María del Tránsito Ocampo (rel. name: Leonor of Saint Mary) (1841–1900), Professed Religious of the Dominican Nuns (Argentina)
  - Declared "Venerable": 19 May 2018
- Giorgio La Pira (1904–1977), Layperson of the Archdiocese of Florence; Member of the Lay Dominicans (Italy)
  - Declared "Venerable": 5 July 2018
- Clorinda Letizia Formai (rel. name: Serafina) (1876–1954), Founder of the Missionary Sisters of the Good News (Italy)
  - Declared "Venerable": 12 February 2019
- María Beatriz del Rosario Arroyo (1884–1957), Founder of the Dominican Sisters of the Most Holy Rosary of the Philippines (Philippines)
  - Declared "Venerable": 11 June 2019
- Francisca de Fuentes (rel. name: Francisca of the Holy Spirit) (1647–1711), Founder of the Dominican Sisters of Saint Catherine of Siena (Philippines)
  - Declared "Venerable": 5 July 2019
- Giulio Facibeni (1884–1958), Priest of the Archdiocese of Florence (Italy)
  - Declared "Venerable": 11 December 2019
- Luisa Guidotti Mistrali (1932–1979), Layperson of the Diocese of Modena-Nonantola; Consecrated Member of the Women's Medical Missionary Association (Italy)
  - Declared "Venerable": 17 December 2022
- Maria Christina Ogier (1955–1974), Young Layperson of the Archdiocese of Florence (Italy)
  - Declared "Venerable": 20 May 2023
- Rose Hawthorne Lathrop (rel. name: Mary Alphonsa) (1851–1926), Founder of the Dominican Sisters of Saint Rose of Lima (Dominican Sisters of Hawthorne) (United States)
  - Declared "Venerable": 14 March 2024
- Didaco Bessi (1856–1919), Priest of the Diocese of Prato; Founder of the Dominican Sisters of Saint Mary of the Rosary (Italy)
  - Declared "Venerable": 24 February 2025
- José Merino Andrés (1905–1968), Professed Priest of the Dominicans (Spain)
  - Declared "Venerable": 26 October 2025

== Servants of God ==
The following list is based according to the Dicastery for the Causes of Saints and Postulation Archives of the Dominican Order.

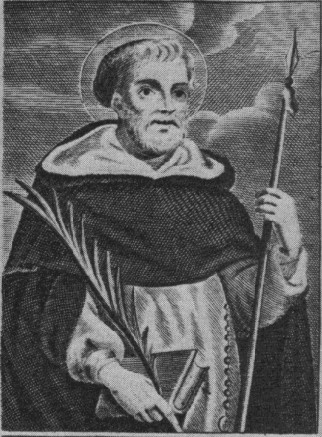
Buzád II Hahót

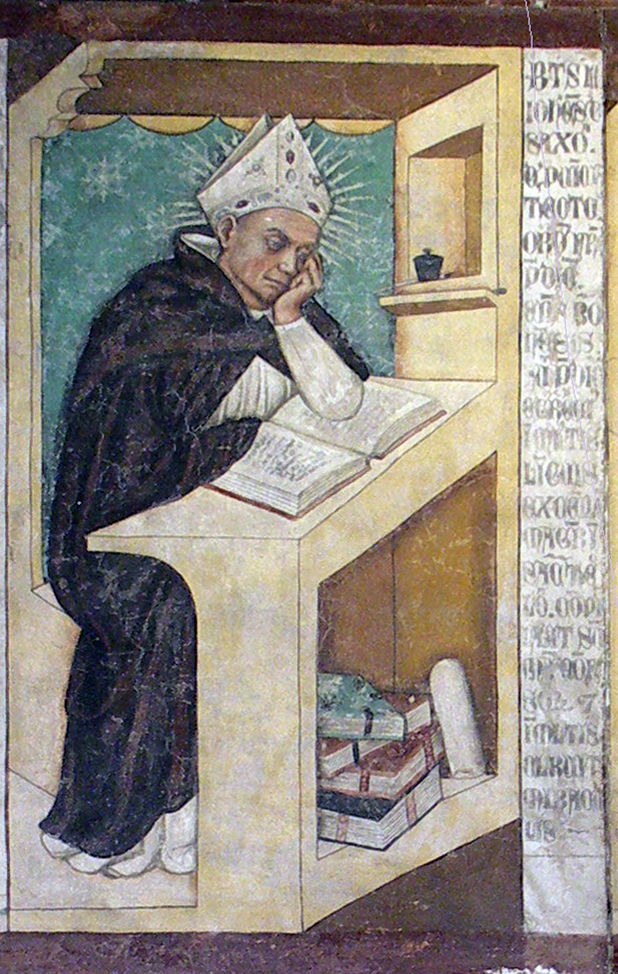
Johannes von Wildeshausen

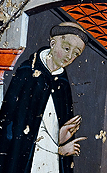
Bernat de Travesseres

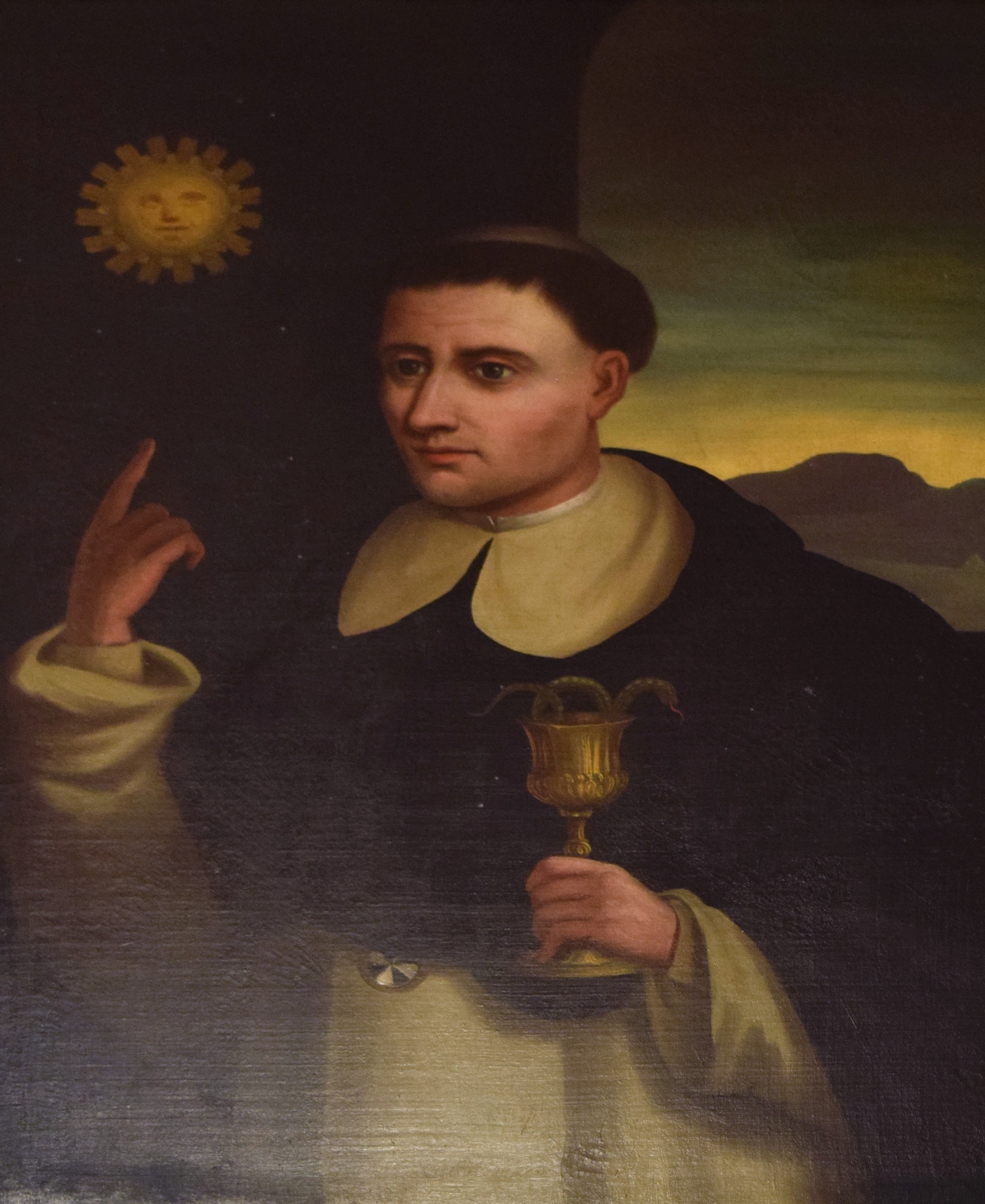
Ponç de Planella

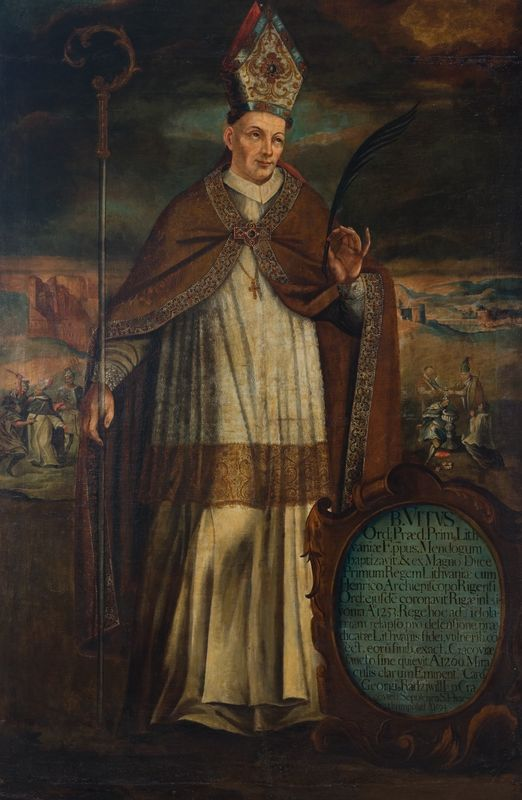
Vitas of Lithuania

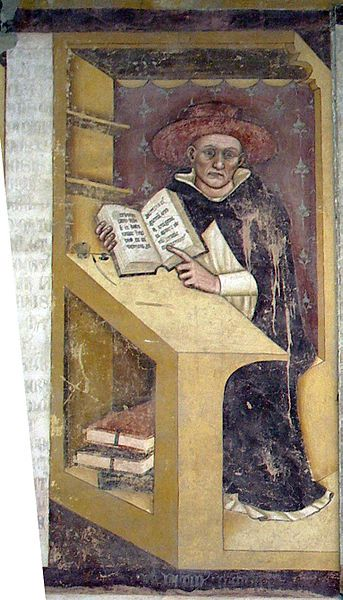
Latino Malabranca Orsini

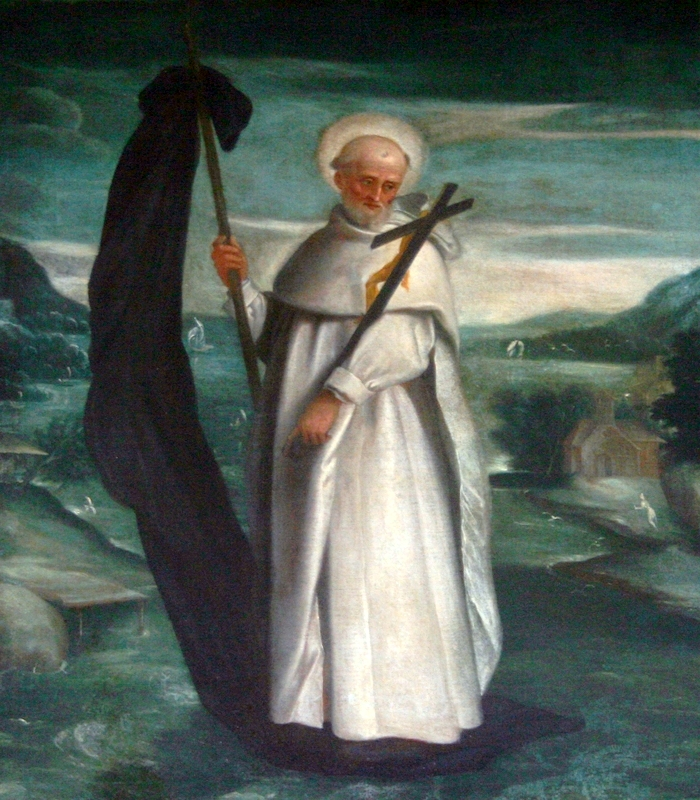
Venturino da Bergamo

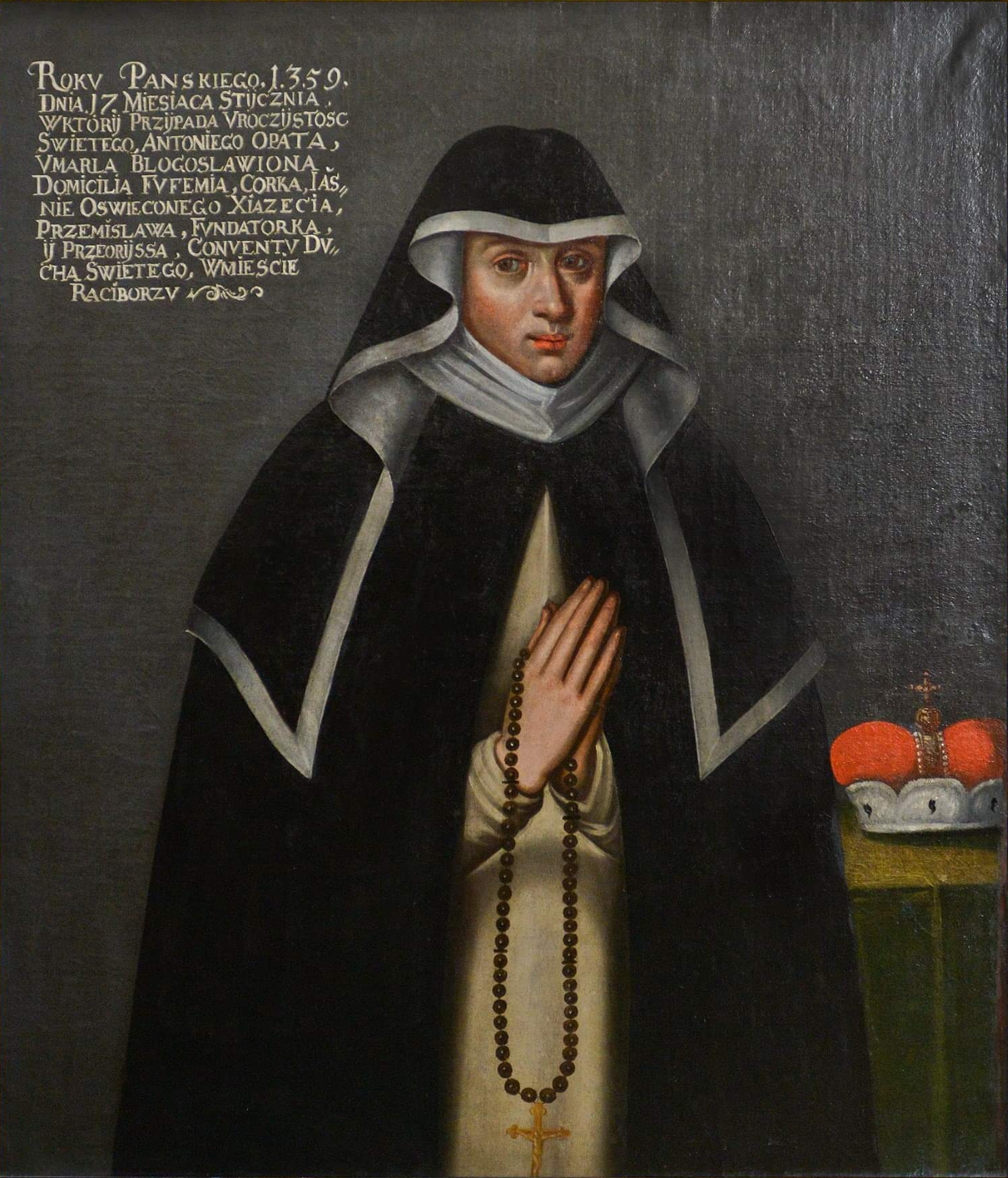
Eufemia of Racibórz

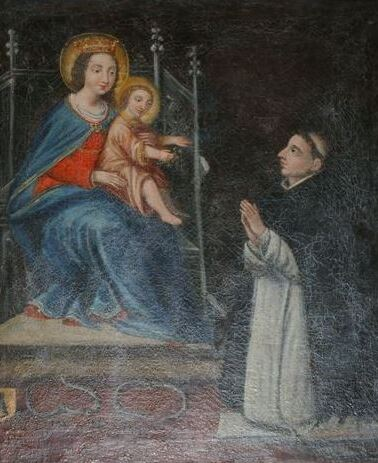
Guillaume d'Orlyé

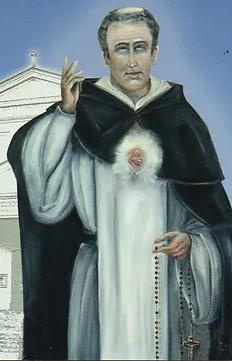
Luca Spicola

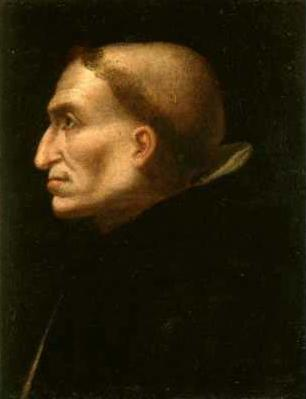
Girolamo Savonarola

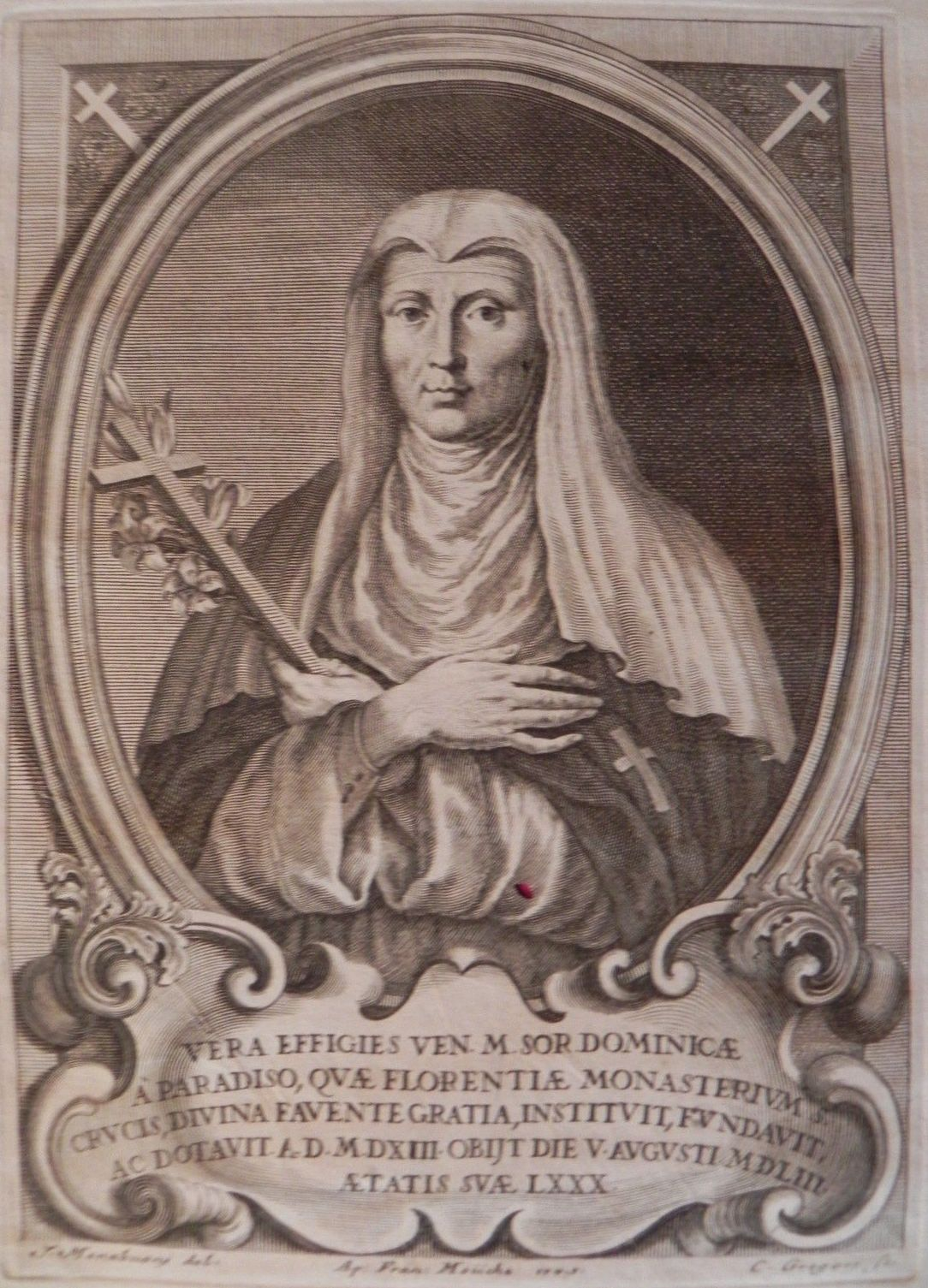
Domenica Narducci

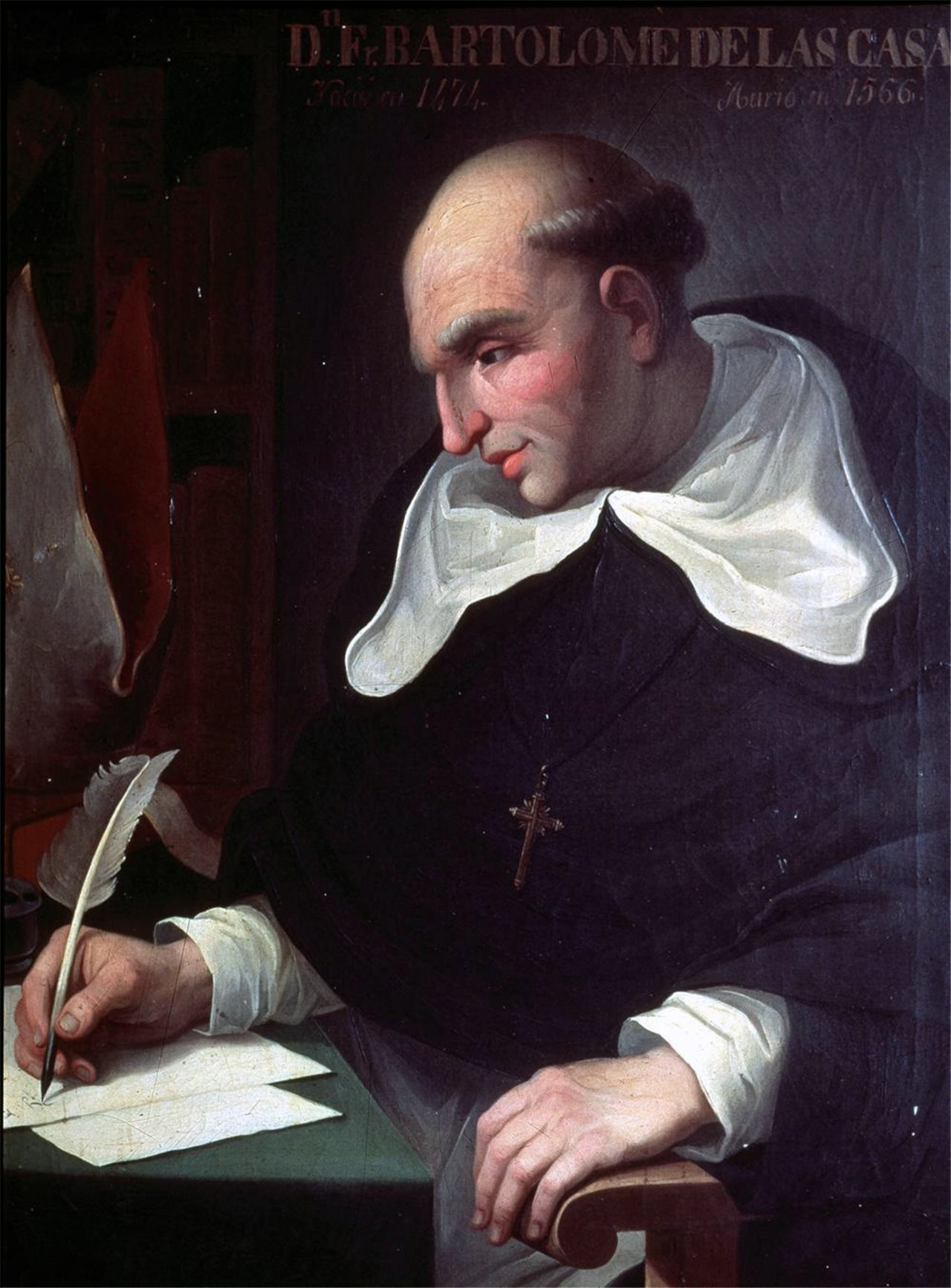
Bartolomé de las Casas

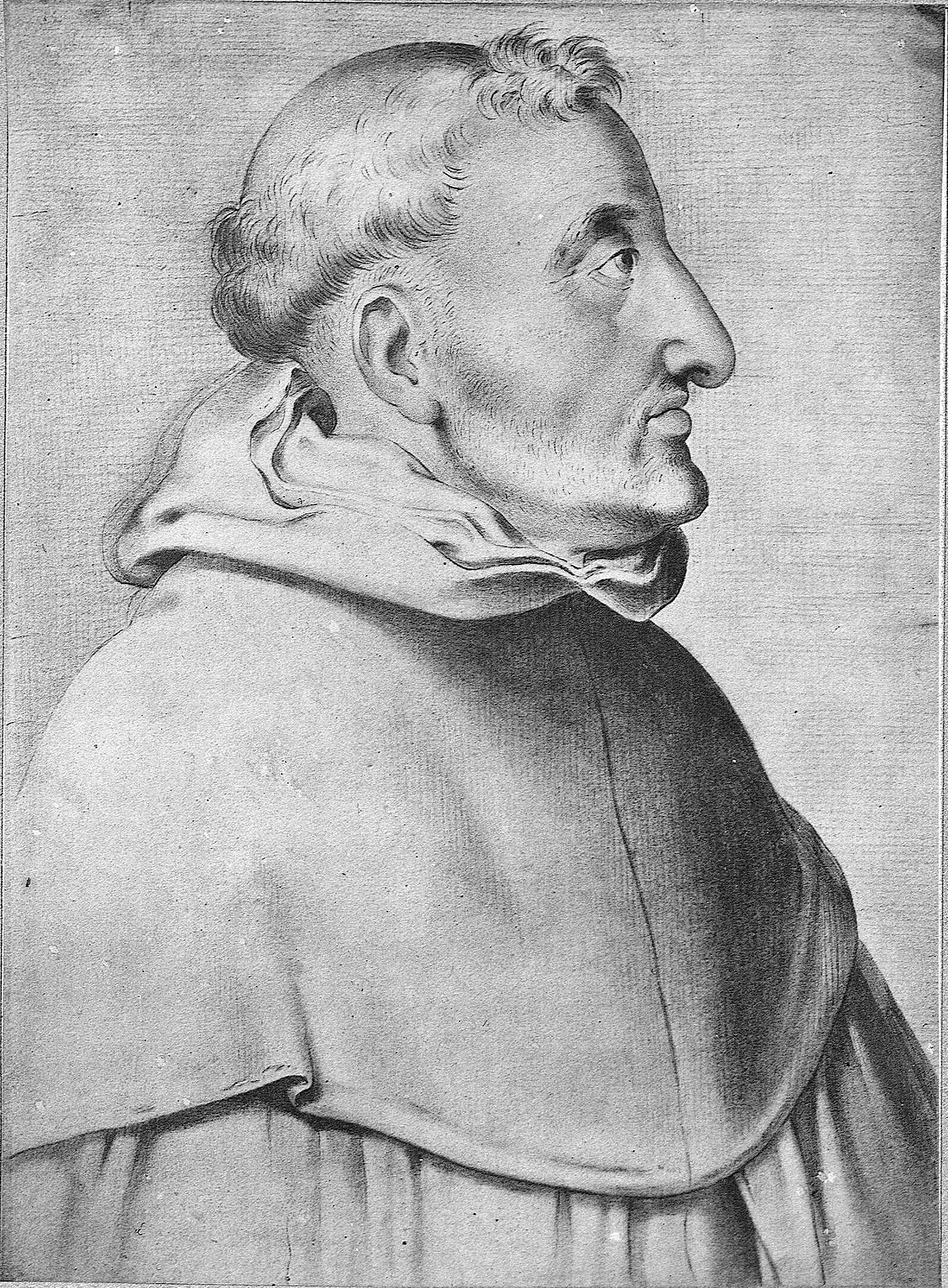
Luís de Sarria

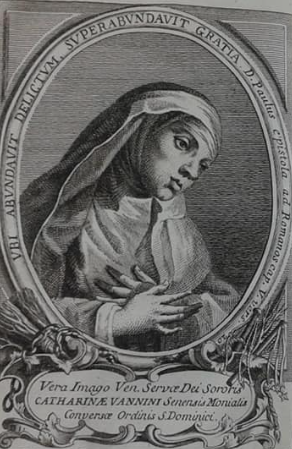
Caterina Vannini

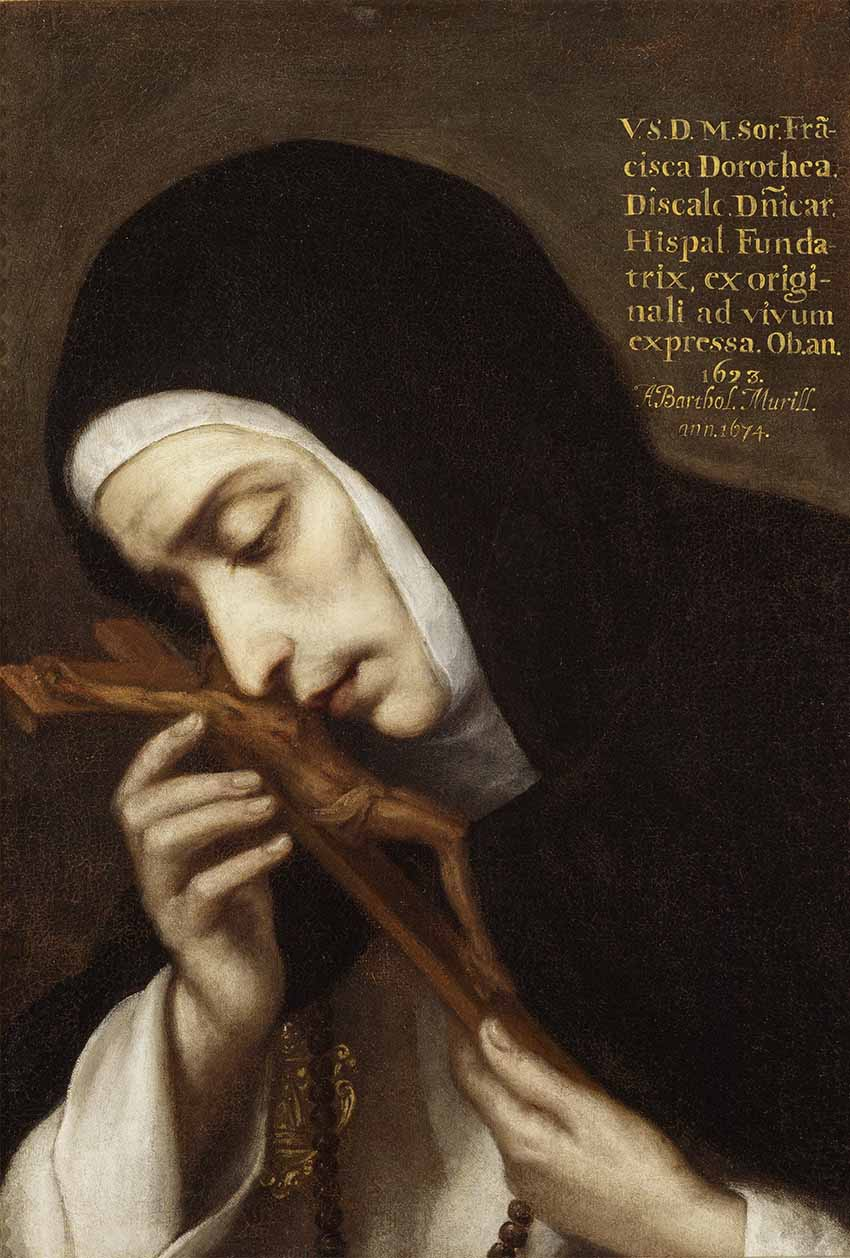
Francisca Dorotea Bernaldo Vivas

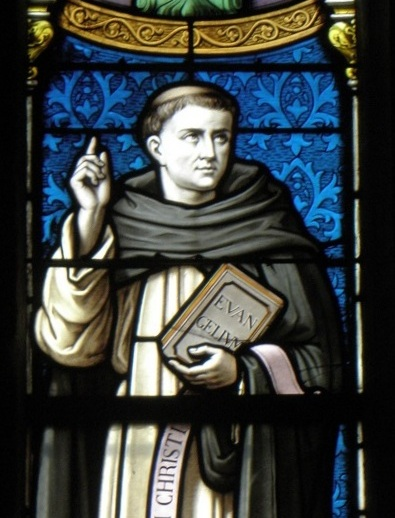
Pierre Quintin

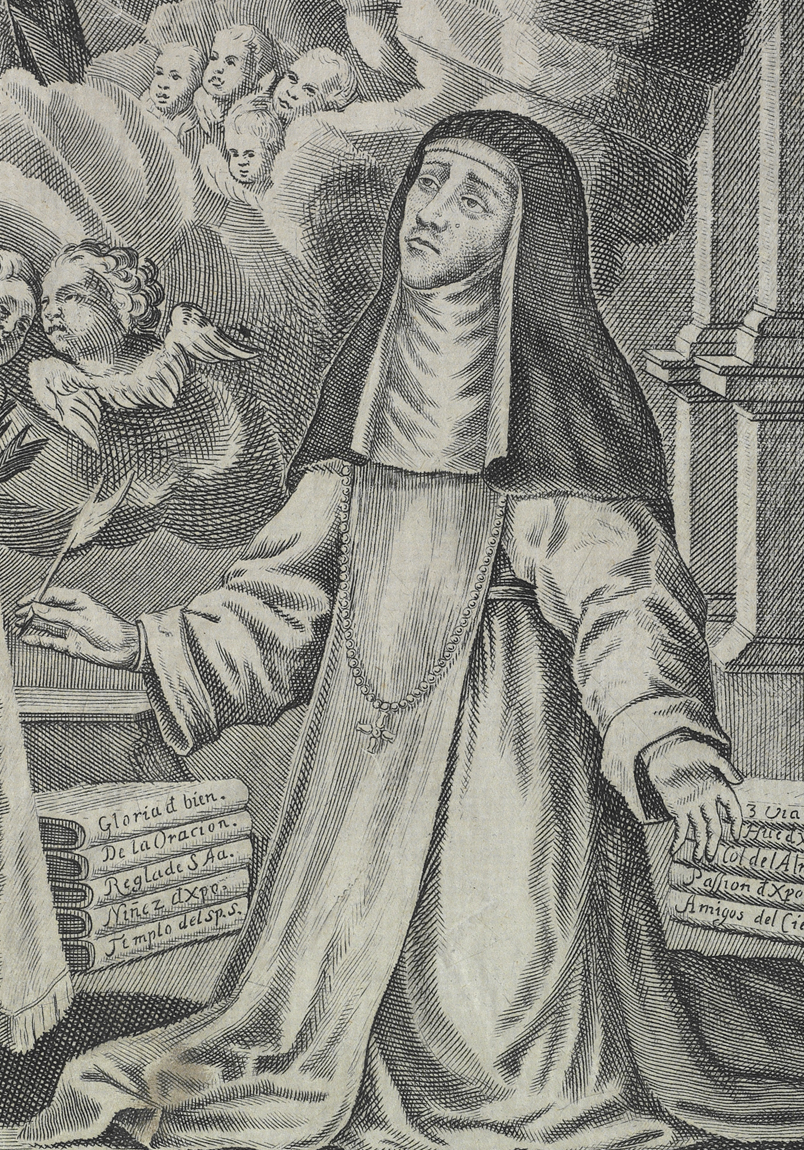
Hipólita de Rocabertí Soler

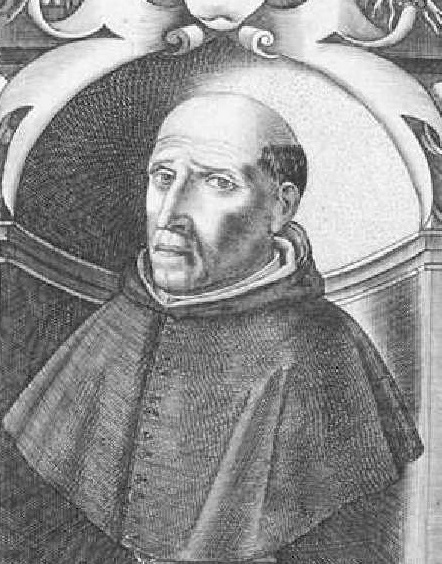
Jerónimo Batista de Lanuza

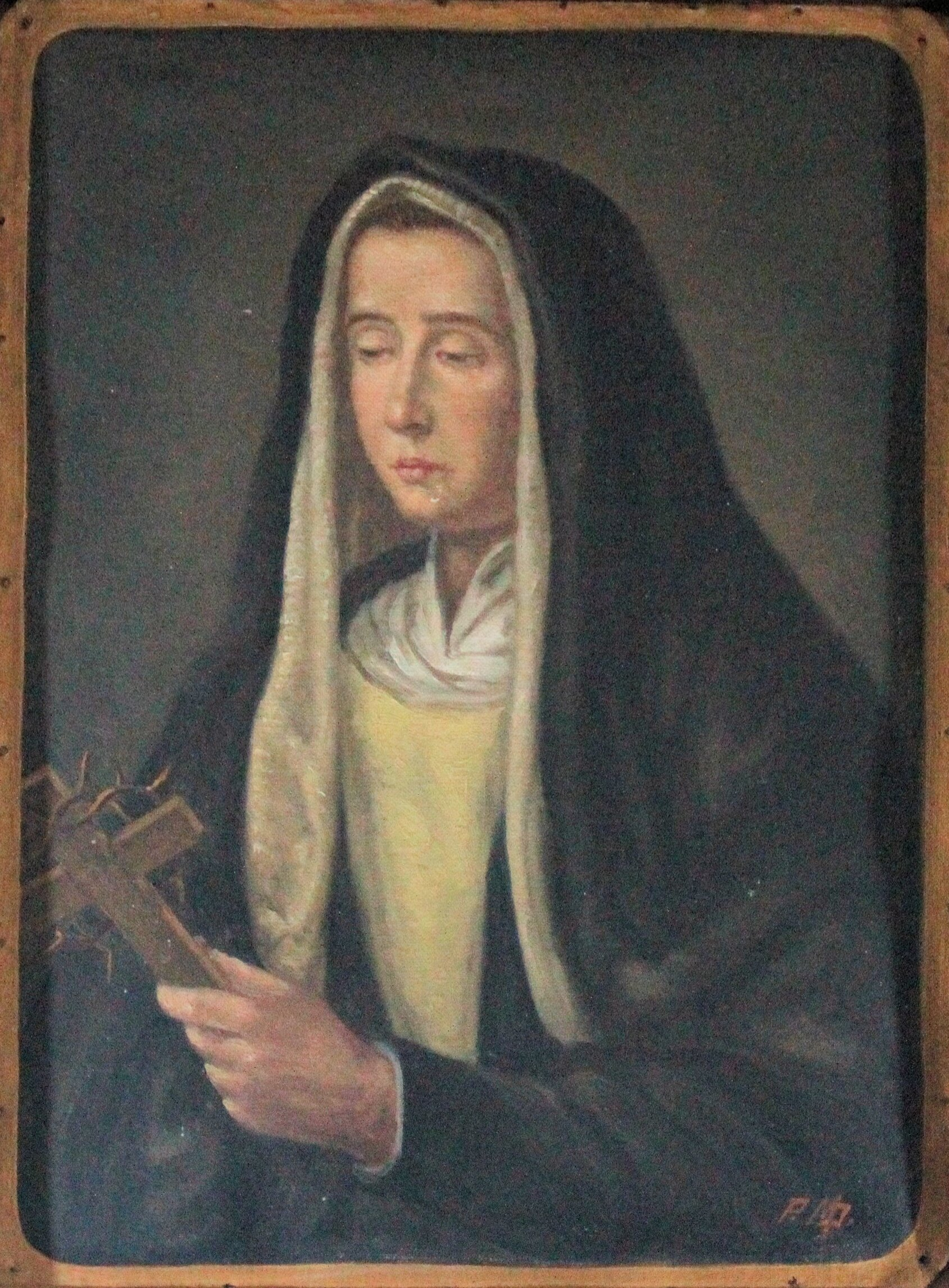
Claudia de Angelis

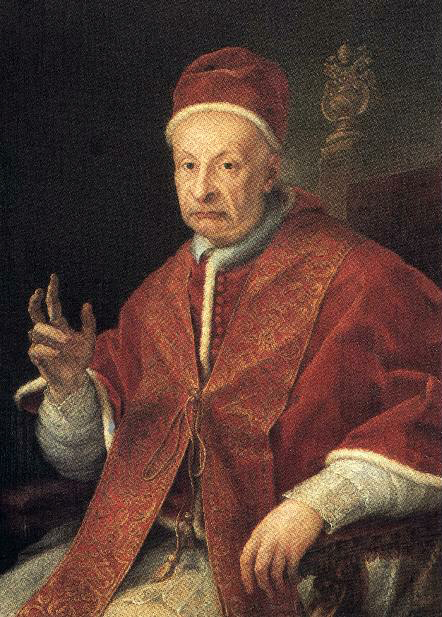
Pope Benedict XIII

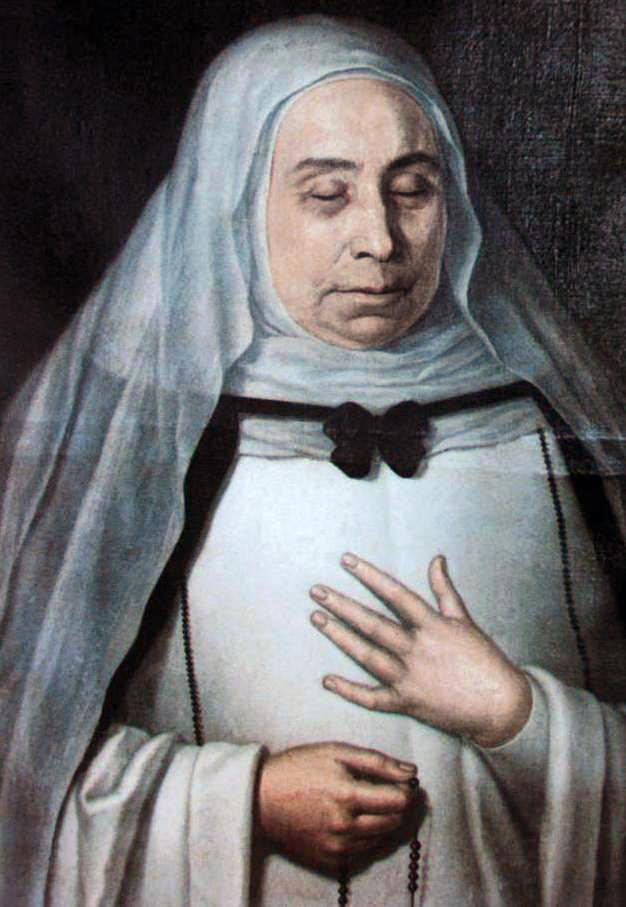
María de León Delgado

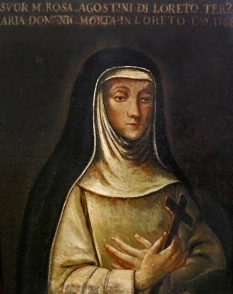
Maria Rosa Agostini

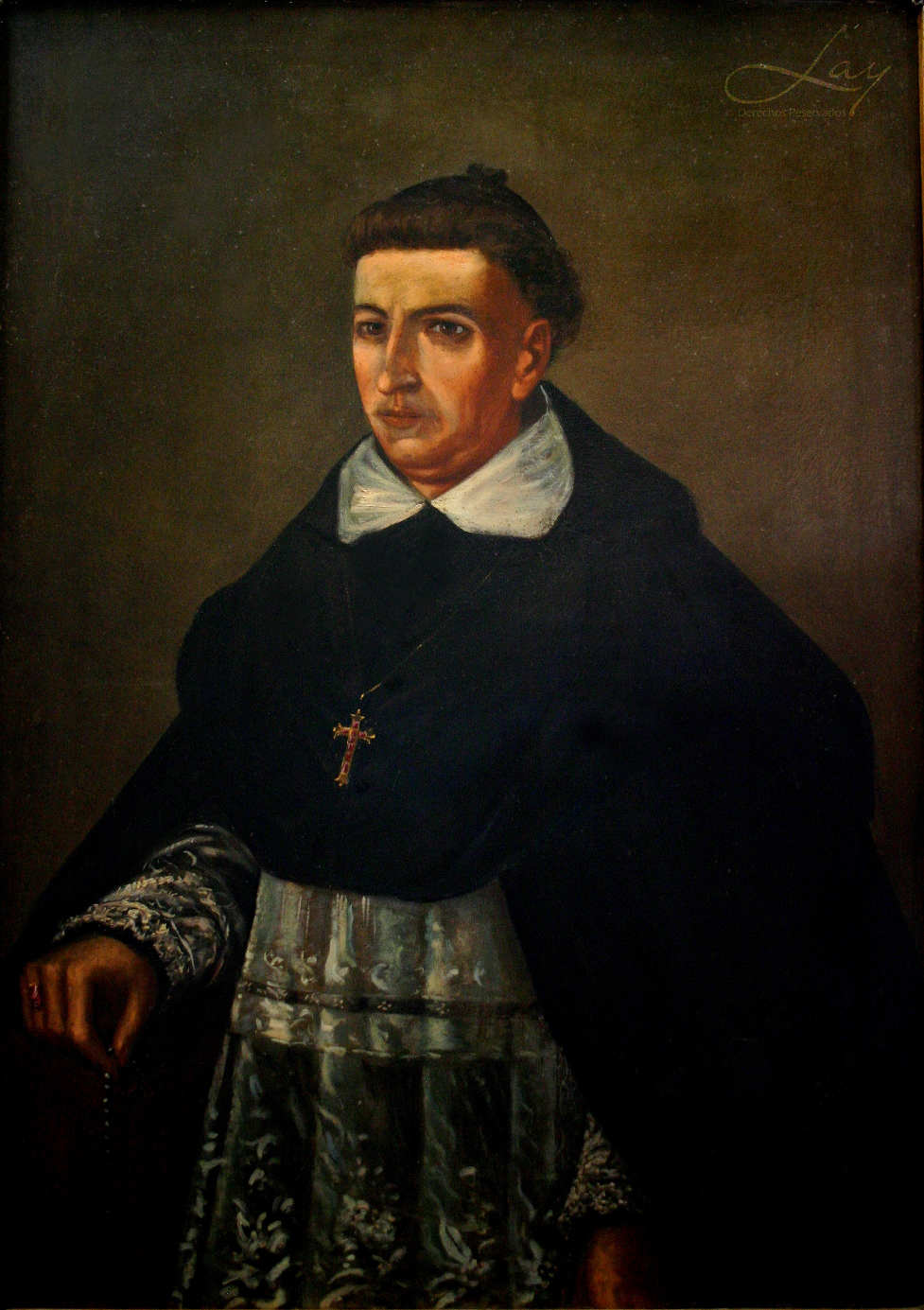
Bp. Antonio Alcalde Barriga

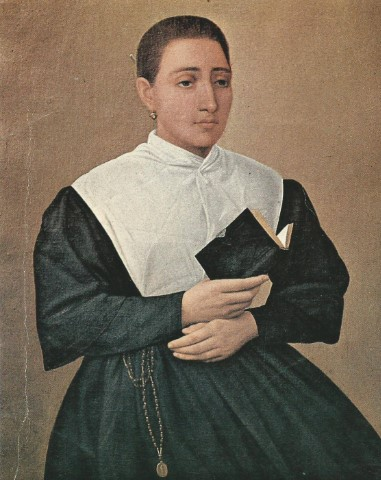
Giuseppina Faro

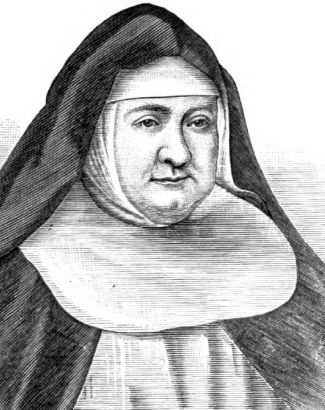
Margaret Mary Hallahan

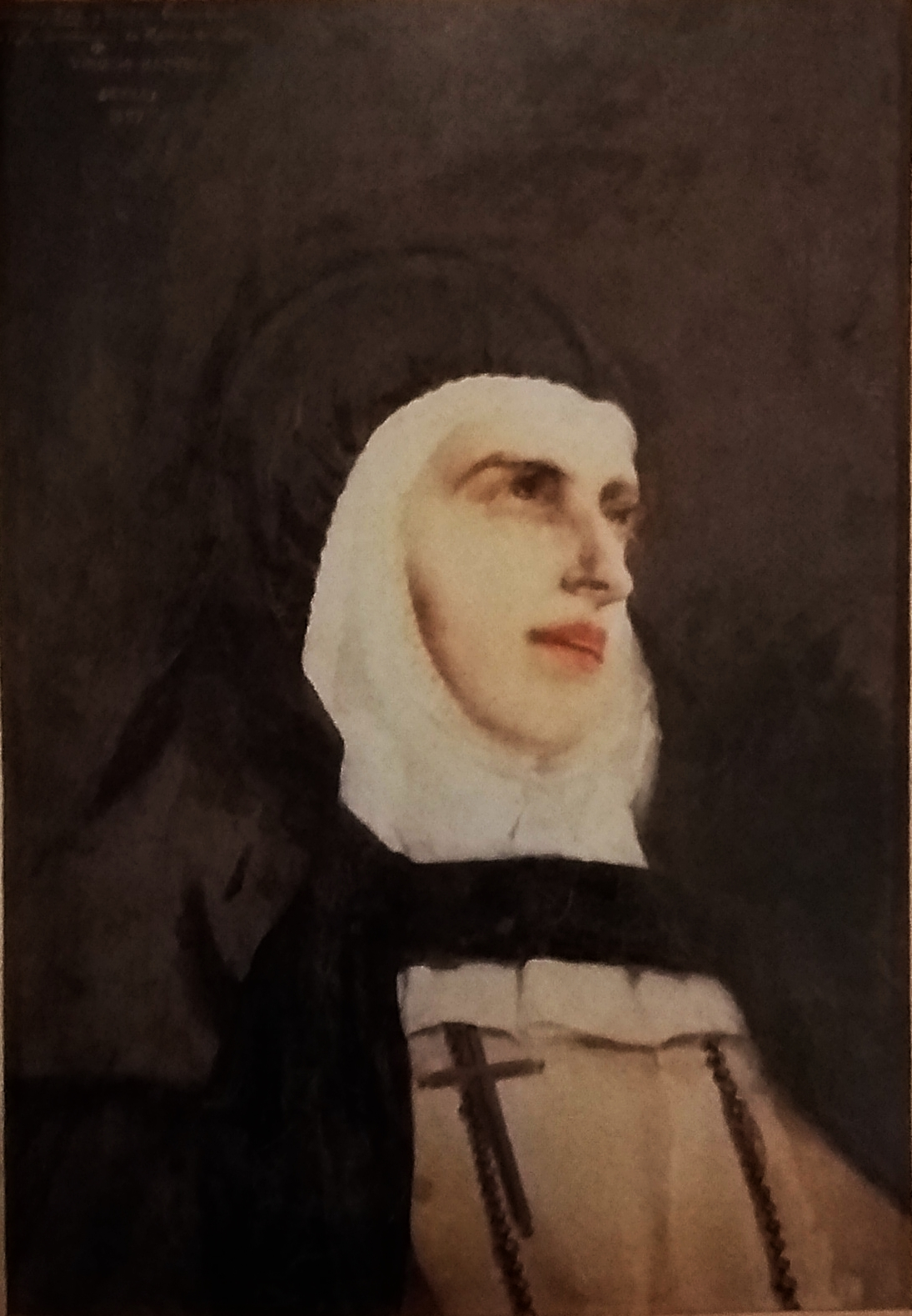
Bárbara Jurado Antúnez

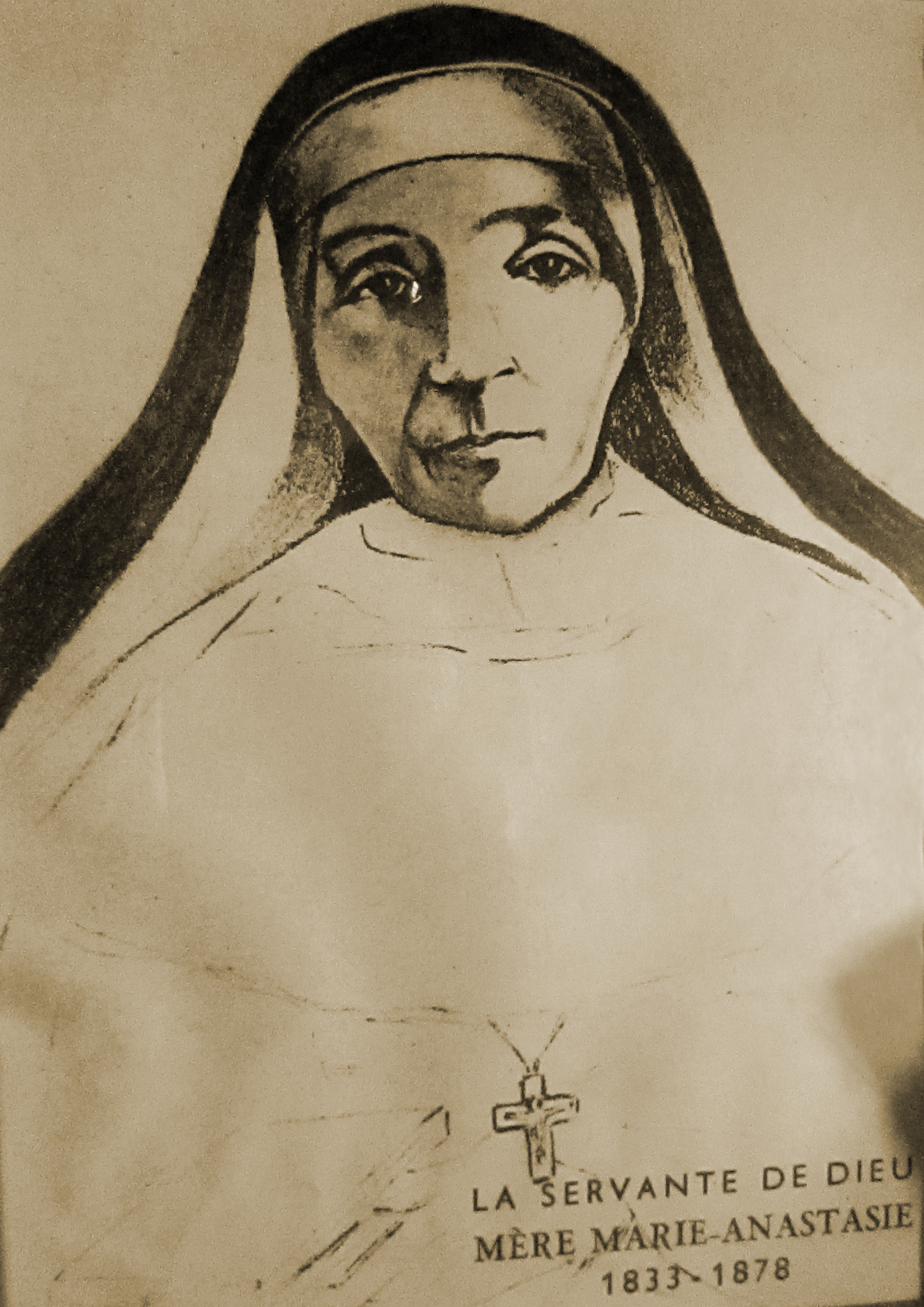
Marie-Anastasie Conduché
- Buzád II Hahót (c. 1180–1241), Professed Priest of the Dominicans; Martyr in odium fidei (Hungary)
- Johannes von Wildeshausen (c. 1180–1252), Professed Priest of the Dominicans; 4th Master General (Germany)
- Bernat de Travesseres (d. 1260), Professed Priest of the Dominicans; Martyr in odium fidei (Spain)
- Galibert [Gualbert] de Savoie (c. 1195–c. 1264), Professed Priest of the Dominicans (France)
- Bernard de Moralaàs (c. 1215–1277), Professed Priest of the Dominicans; Martyr in odium fidei (France–Portugal)
- Ponç de Planella (c. 1200–1279), Professed Priest of the Dominicans; Martyr in odium fidei (Spain)
- Pere de Cadireta (d. 1279), Professed Priest of the Dominicans; Martyr in odium fidei (Spain)
- Vitas (d. 1269), Professed Priest of the Dominicans; Bishop of Vilnius (Lithuania–Poland)
- Latino Malabranca Orsini (d. 1294), Professed Priest of the Dominicans; Cardinal (Italy)
- Venturino da Bergamo (1304–1346), Professed Priest of the Dominicans (Italy)
- Reginaldo [Nallo] Montemarte (1292–1348), Professed Priest of the Dominicans (Italy)
- Eufemia [Ofka] of Racibórz (c. 1299–1359), Professed Religious of the Dominican Nuns (Poland)
- Guillaume d'Orlyé (1404–1458), Professed Priest of the Dominicans (Switzerland–France)
- Luca Spicola (c. 1425–1490), Professed Priest of the Dominicans (Italy)
- Girolamo Savonarola (1452–1498), Professed Priest of the Dominicans (Italy)
- Mario Annibale d'Aquino (rel. name: Luigi) (c. 1547–1523), Professed Priest of the Dominicans (Italy)
- Domenica Narducci (rel. name: Domenica of Paradise) (1473–1553), Professed Religious of the Dominican Nuns (Italy)
- Bartolomé de las Casas (1484–1566), Professed Priest of the Dominicans; Bishop of Chiapas (Spain)
- Luís de Sarria (1504–1588), Professed Priest of the Dominicans (Spain)
- Pablo Martín González (rel. name: Pablo of Saint Mary) (c. 1538–1597), Professed Religious of the Dominicans (Spain)
- Caterina Vannini (1543–1606), Professed Religious of the Dominican "Convertite" Nuns (Italy)
- Francesca Caterina Vacchini (1589–1609), Layperson of the Diocese of Viterbo; Member of the Lay Dominicans (Italy)
- Vincenzo Maffei (rel. name: Marco) (1542–1616), Professed Priest of the Dominicans (Italy)
- Giovanni Leonardo de Fusco (1569–1621), Professed Priest of the Dominicans (Italy)
- Agueda de la Cruz (c. 1549–1621), Layperson of the Archdiocese of Madrid; Member of the Lay Dominicans (Spain)
- Francisca Dorotea Bernaldo Vivas (1558–1623), Professed Religious of the Dominican Nuns (Spain)
- Mario Annibale d'Aquino (c. 1547–1623), Professed Priest of the Dominicans (Italy)
- Isabel de Rocabertí Soler (rel. name: Hipólita of Jesus) (1551–1624), Professed Religious of the Dominican Nuns
- Jerónimo Bautista de Lanuza (1553–1624), Professed Priest of the Dominicans; Bishop of Barbastro and Albarracín (Spain)
- Pierre Quintin (1569–1629), Professed Priest of the Dominicans (France)
- Francesca Paluzzi (rel. name: Caterina of Jesus Mary) (1571–1645), Professed Religious of the Dominican Nuns (Italy)
- Inés Sisternes de Oblites Gisbert (rel. name: Inés of the Holy Spirit) (1612–1668), Professed Religious of the Dominican Nuns (Spain)
- Beatrice Villani (rel. name: Maria) (1584–1670), Professed Religious of the Dominican Nuns (Italy)
- Giacomo Ruffo (rel. name: Tommaso Maria) (1618–1691), Professed Priest of the Dominicans; Archbishop of Bari-Canosa (Italy)
- Ludovico Maria Calco (1669–1709), Professed Priest of the Dominicans (Italy)
- Claudia de Angelis (rel. name: Claudia of the Cross) (1675–1715), Founder of the Cistercian Sisters of Charity (Italy)
- Josefa Berride Bureth (1648–1717), Layperson of the Diocese of Huesca; Member of the Lay Dominicans (Spain)
- Pope Benedict XIII [Pier Francesco Orsini] (rel. name: Vincenzo Maria) (1649–1730), Professed Priest of the Dominicans; Pope (Italy)
- María de León Delgado (rel. name: María of Jesus) (1643–1731), Professed Religious of the Dominican Nuns (Spain)
- Maria Cristina Tondi (rel. name: Maria Columba of Saint Mary of the Cross) (1696–1731), Professed Religious of the Dominican Nuns (Italy)
- Francesca Antonia Giannini (rel. name: Maria Rosa) (1670–1741), Professed Religious of the Dominican Tertiary Nuns (Italy)
- Tshikaba (rel. name: Teresa Juliana of Saint Dominic) (1676–1748), Professed Religious of the Dominican Nuns (Guinea–Spain)
- Maria Rosa Agostini (1722–1768), Professed Religious of the Dominican Tertiary Nuns (Italy)
- Maria Anna Schonath (rel. name: Maria Columba) (1730–1787), Professed Religious of the Dominican Nuns (Germany)
- Antonio Alcalde Barriga (1701–1792), Professed Priest of the Dominicans; Bishop of Guadalajara (Mexico)
- Anne-Catherine Aubert (1755–1794), Professed Religious of the Dominican Nuns; Martyr in odium fidei (France)
- Angélique Maillé-Desmarais (1735–1794), Professed Religious of the Dominican Nuns; Martyr in odium fidei (France)
- Louis Pacot (1760–1794), Professed Priest of the Dominicans; Martyr in odium fidei (France)
- Elizabeth Dorat (rel. name: Sœur Saint Thomas) (1753–1794), Professed Religious of the Dominican Sisters of Le Puy; Martyr in odium fidei (France)
- Antonia Tirado Ramírez (rel. name: María Antonia of Jesus) (1740–1810), Founder of the Dominican Sisters of the Blessed Sacrament (Spain)
- Maria Apollonia Caterina Tosetti (rel. name: Reginalda) (1748–1817), Professed Religious of the Dominican Nuns (Italy)
- María del Carmen Benavides Mujica (1777–1849), Layperson of the Diocese of Valparaíso; Member of the Lay Dominicans (Chile)
- Giuseppina Faro (1847–1871), Young Layperson of the Archdiocese of Catania (Italy)
- Margaret Hallahan (1802–1868), Founder of the Dominican Sisters of the English Congregation of Saint Catherine of Siena (Dominican Sisters of Stone) (United Kingdom)
- Bárbara Jurado Antúnez (rel. name: Bárbara of Saint Dominic) (1842–1872), Professed Religious of the Dominican Nuns (Spain)
- Marie-Alexandrine Conduché (rel. name: Marie-Anastasie) (1833–1878), Founder of the Dominican Sisters of the Congregation of Our Lady of the Most Holy Rosary of Monteils (France)
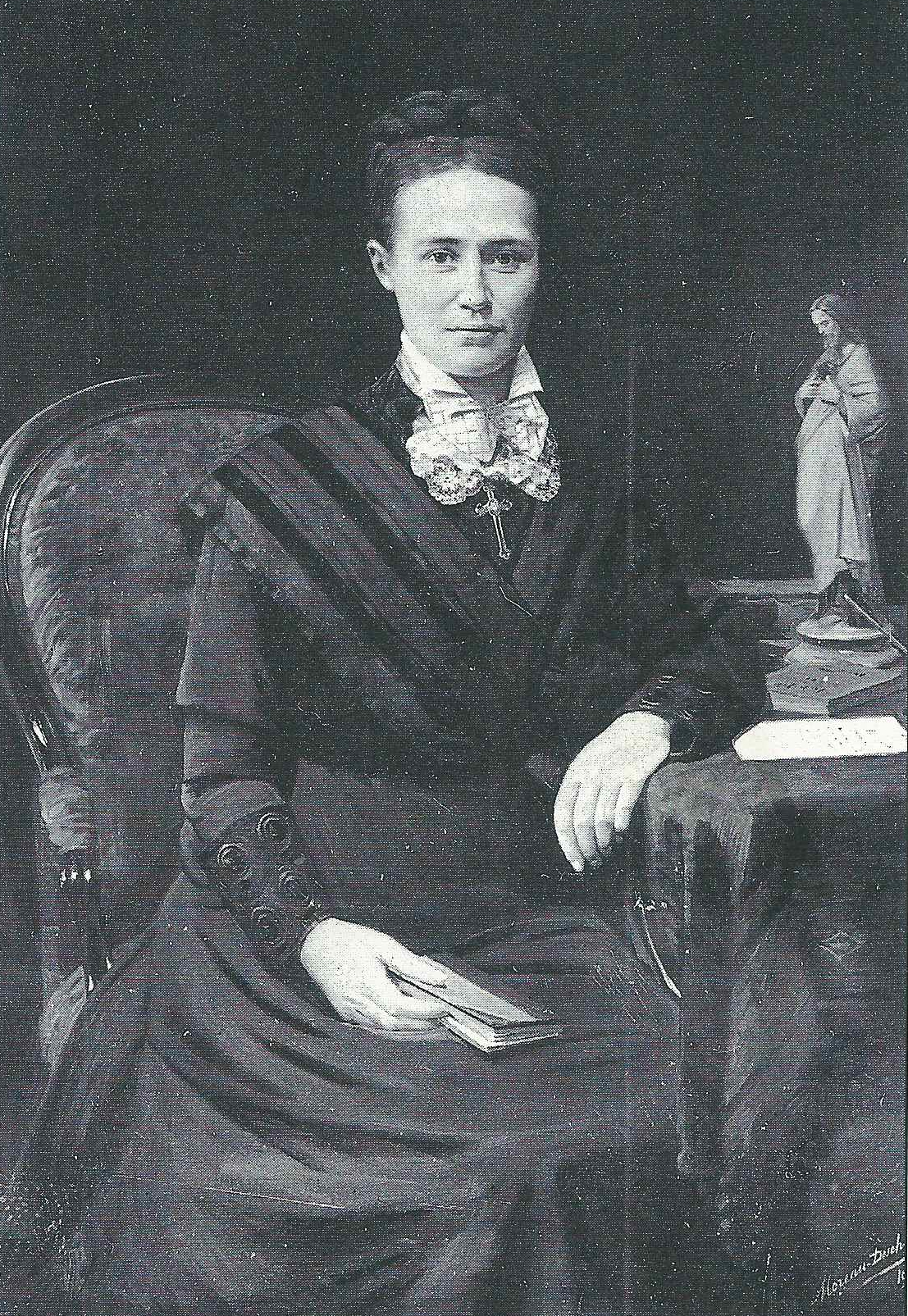
Louise Nicolle

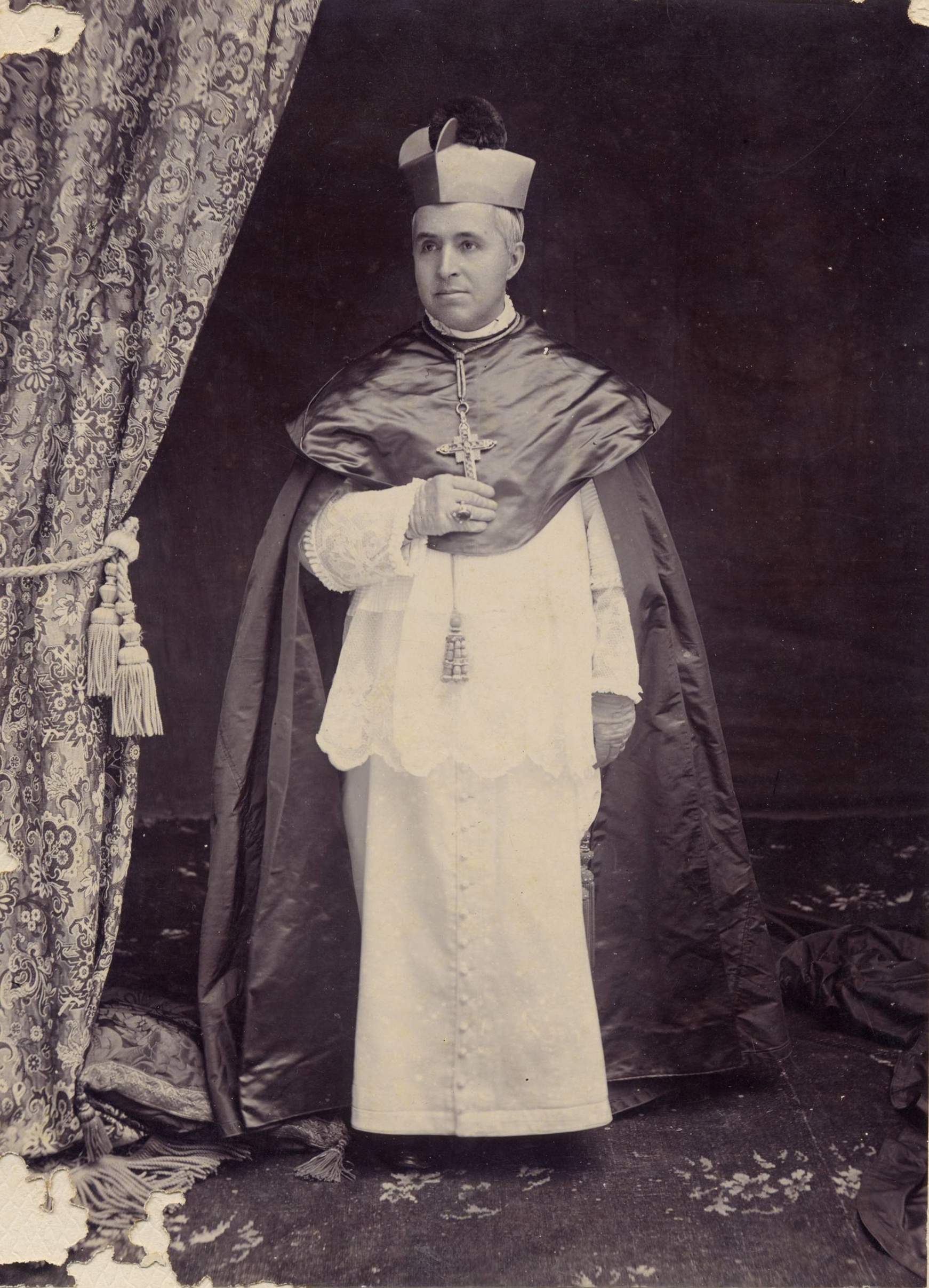
José Cueto Díez de la Maza

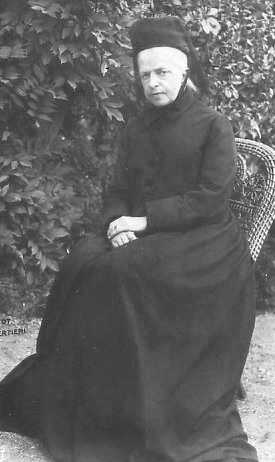
Maria Clotilde di Savoia

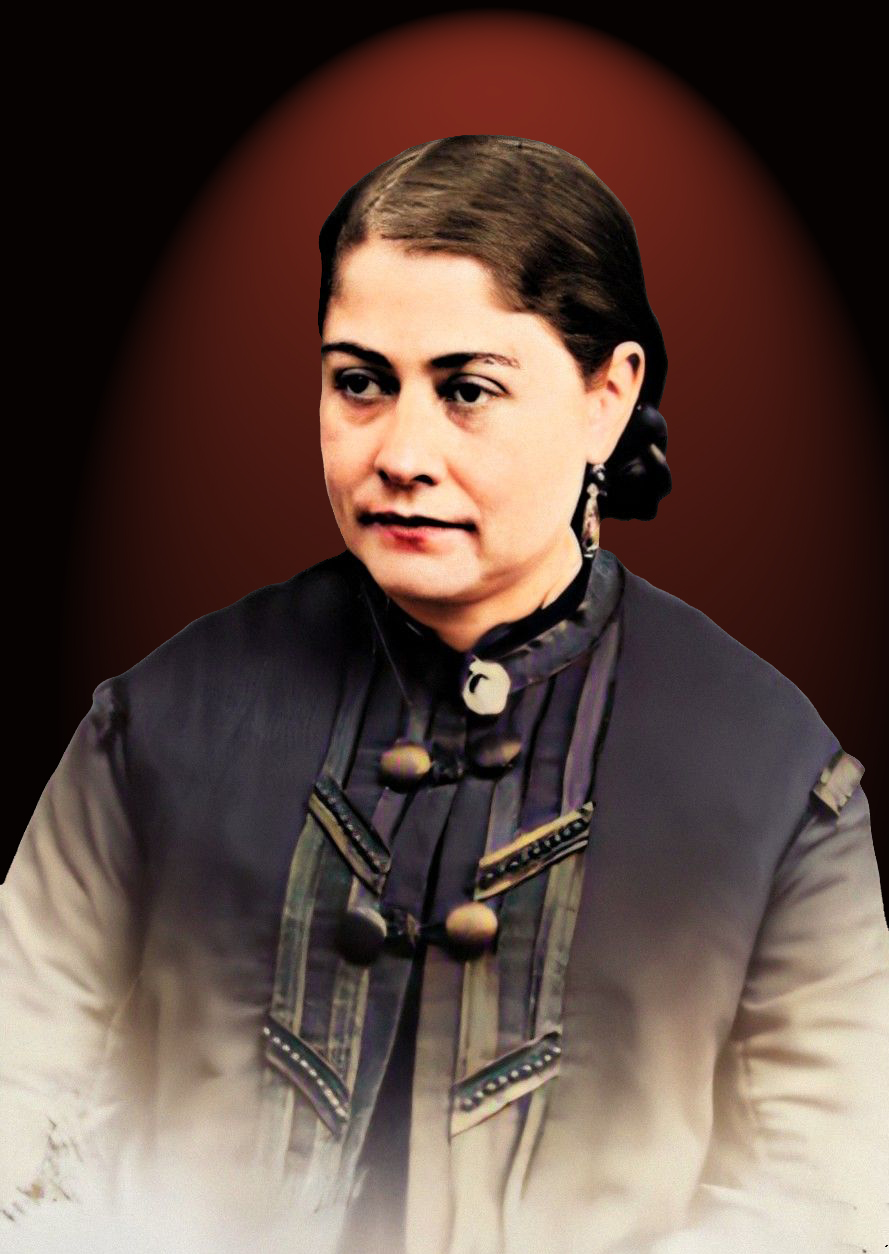
Elmina Paz de Gallo

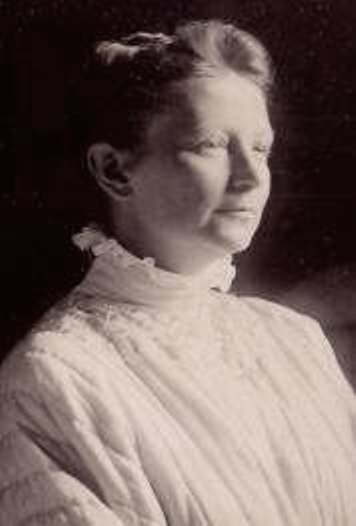
Élisabeth Arrighi Leseur

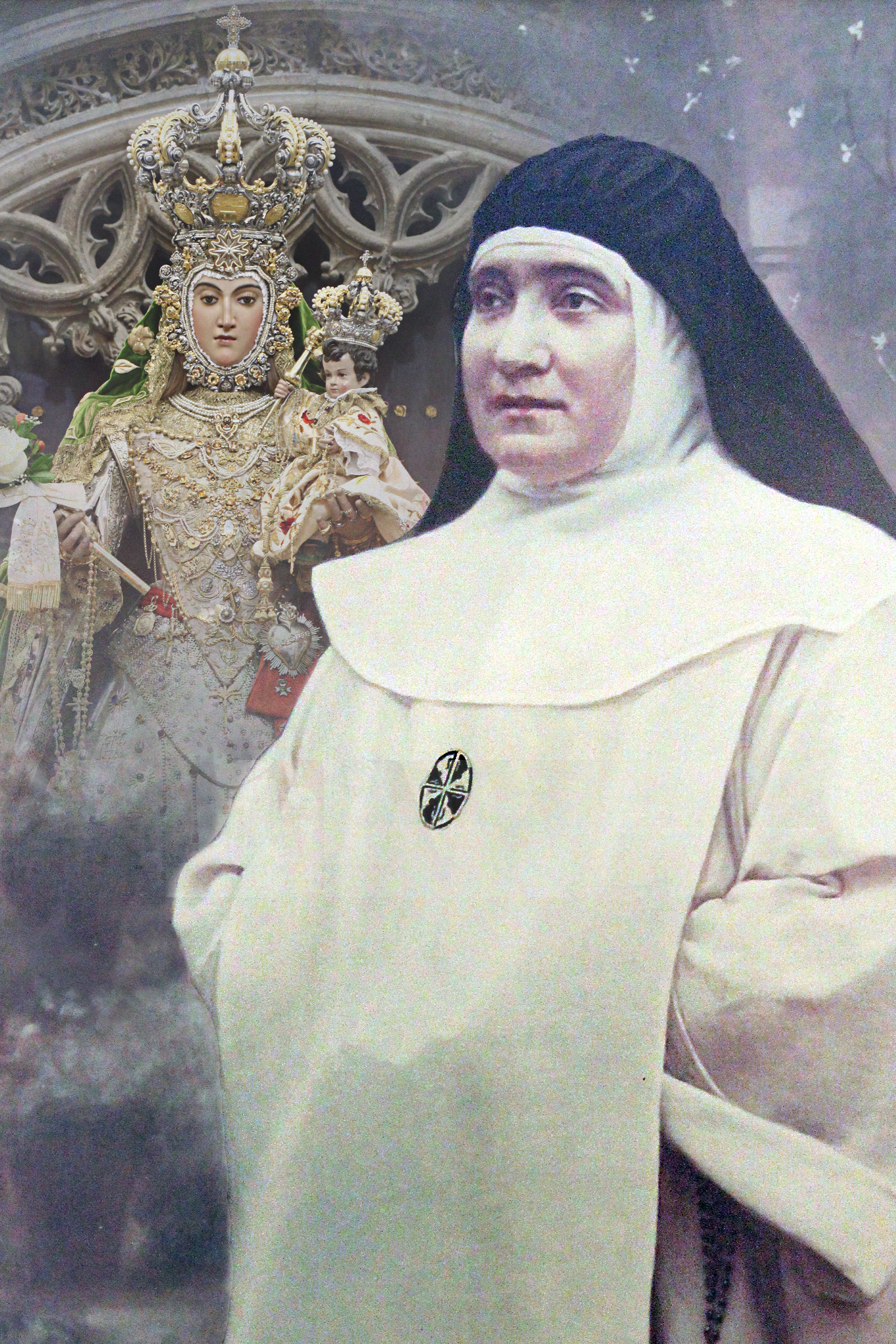
Teresa Titos Garzón

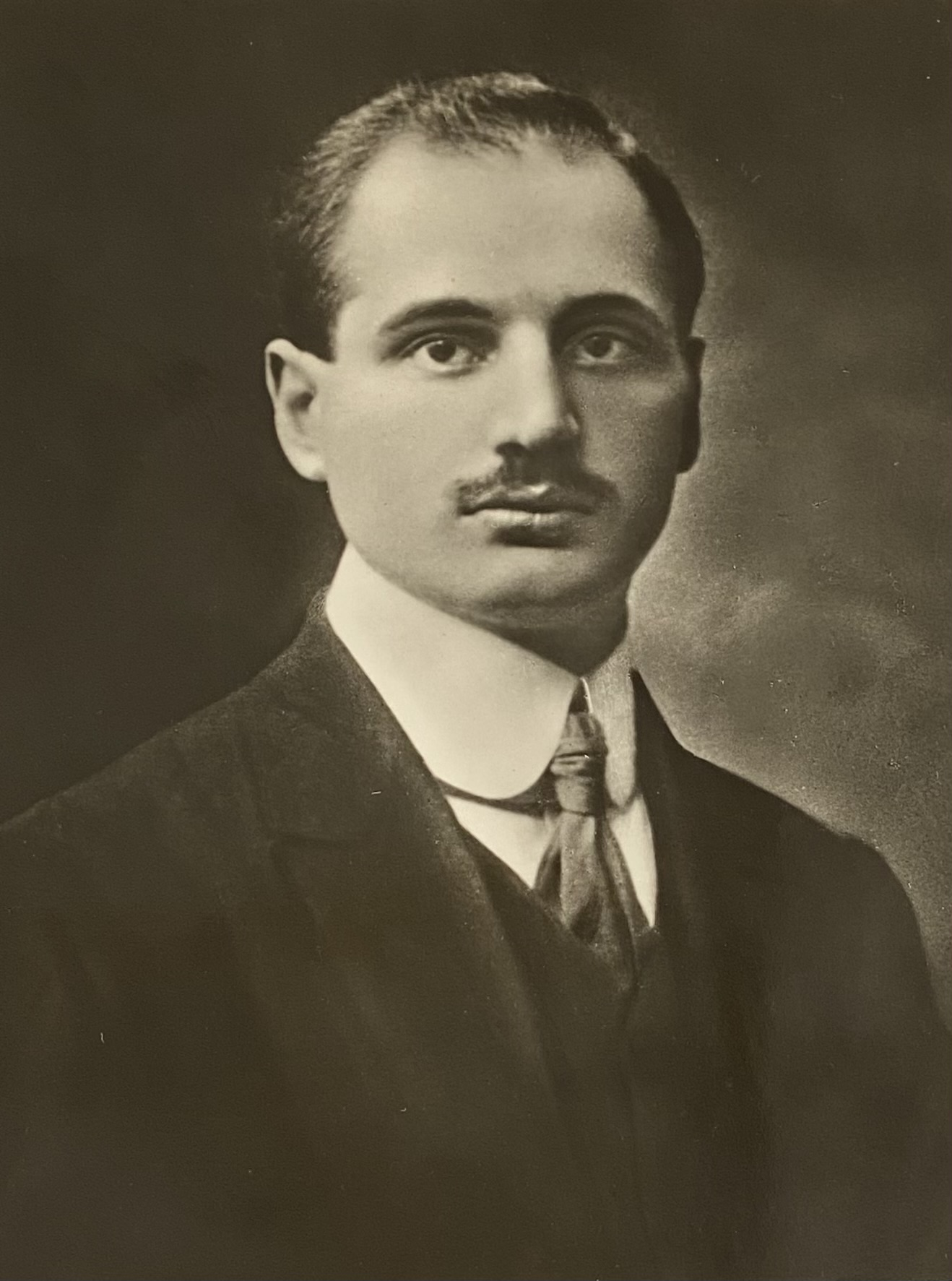
Guido Negri

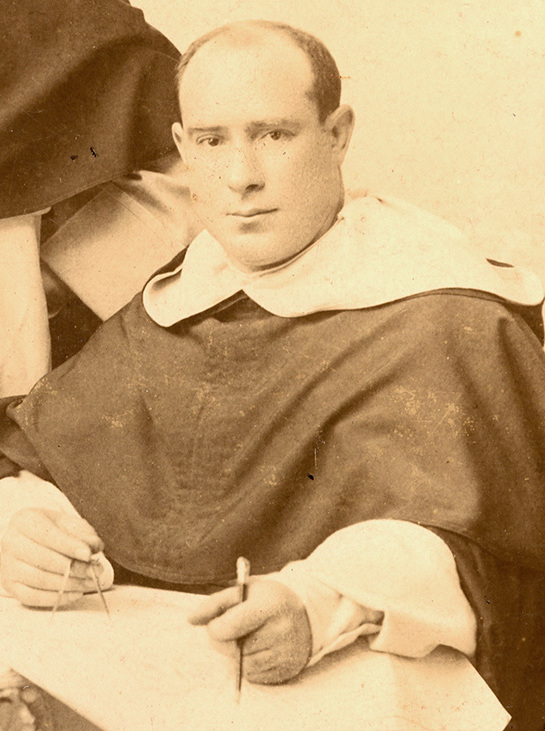
Ramón Zubieta Les

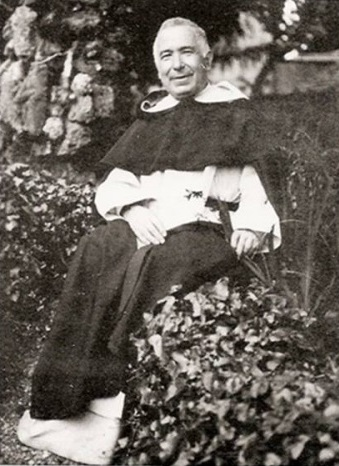
Juan González Arintero

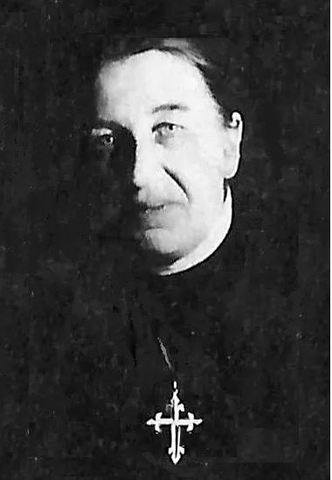
Anna Ivanovna Abrikosova

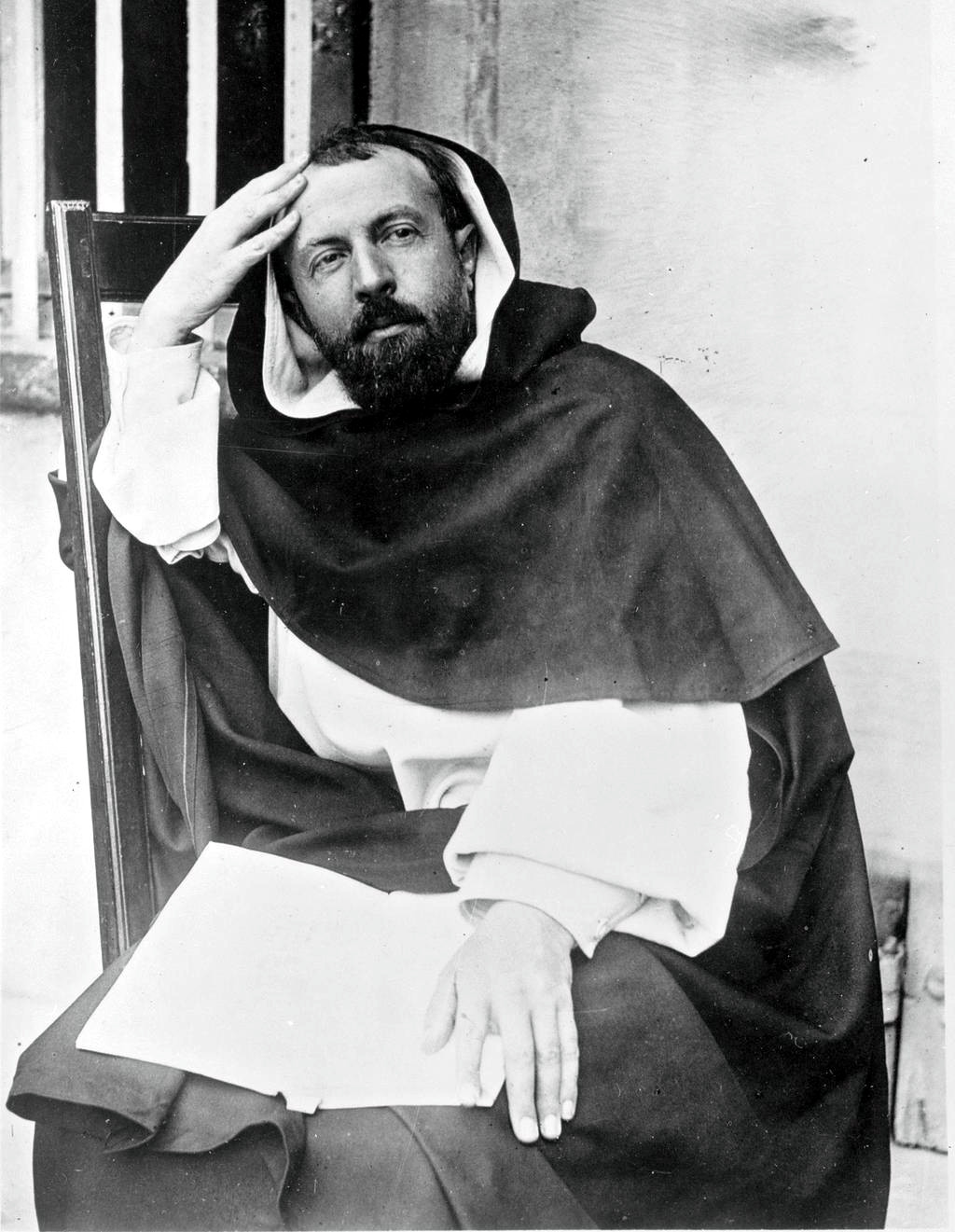
Marie-Joseph Lagrange

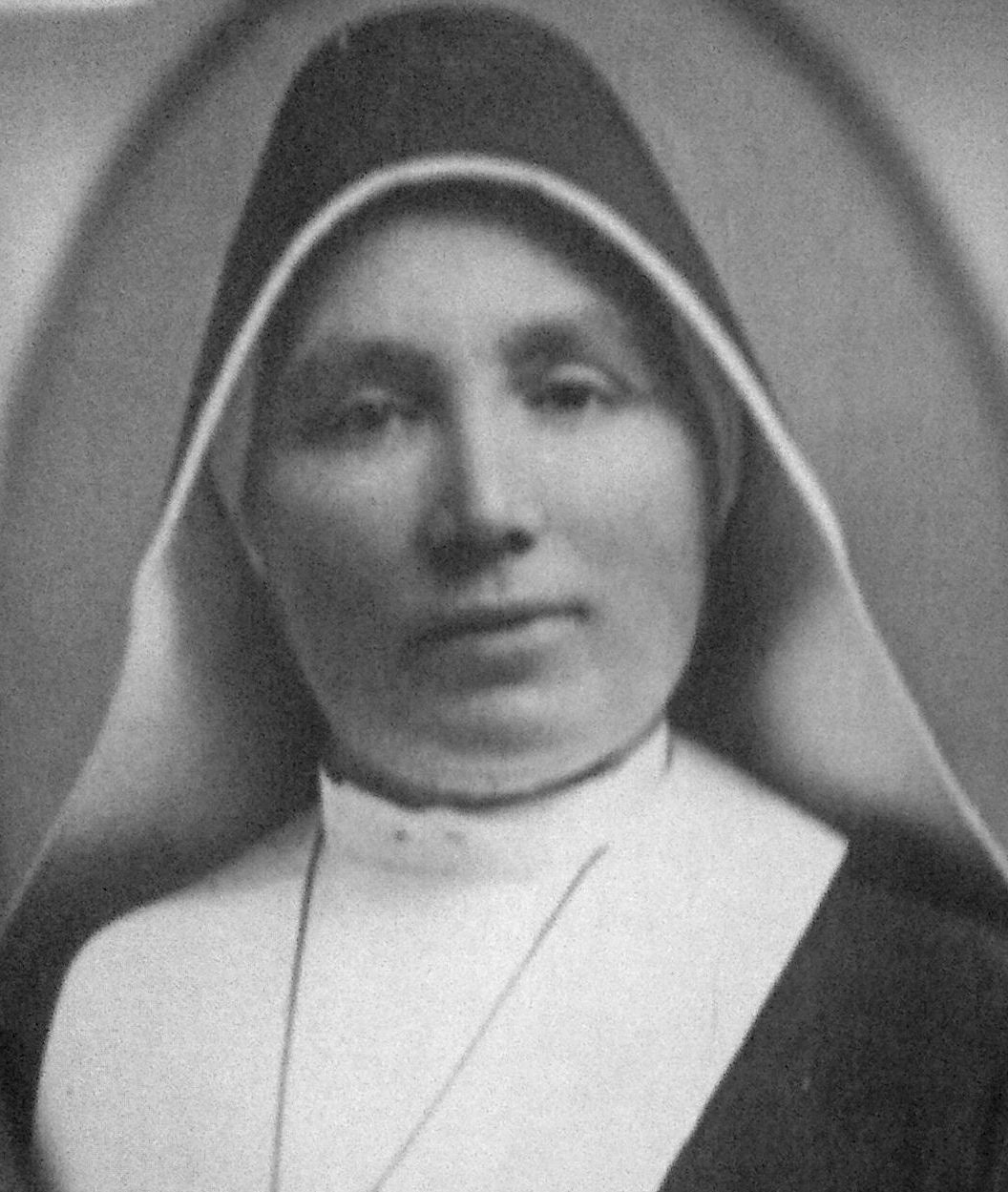
Giuseppina Arcucci

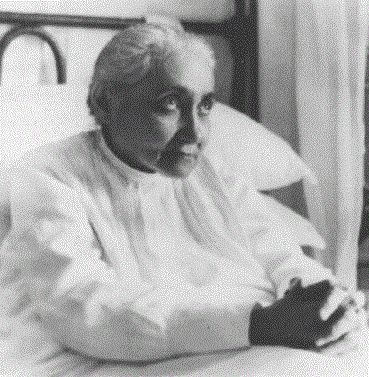
Luisa Piccarreta

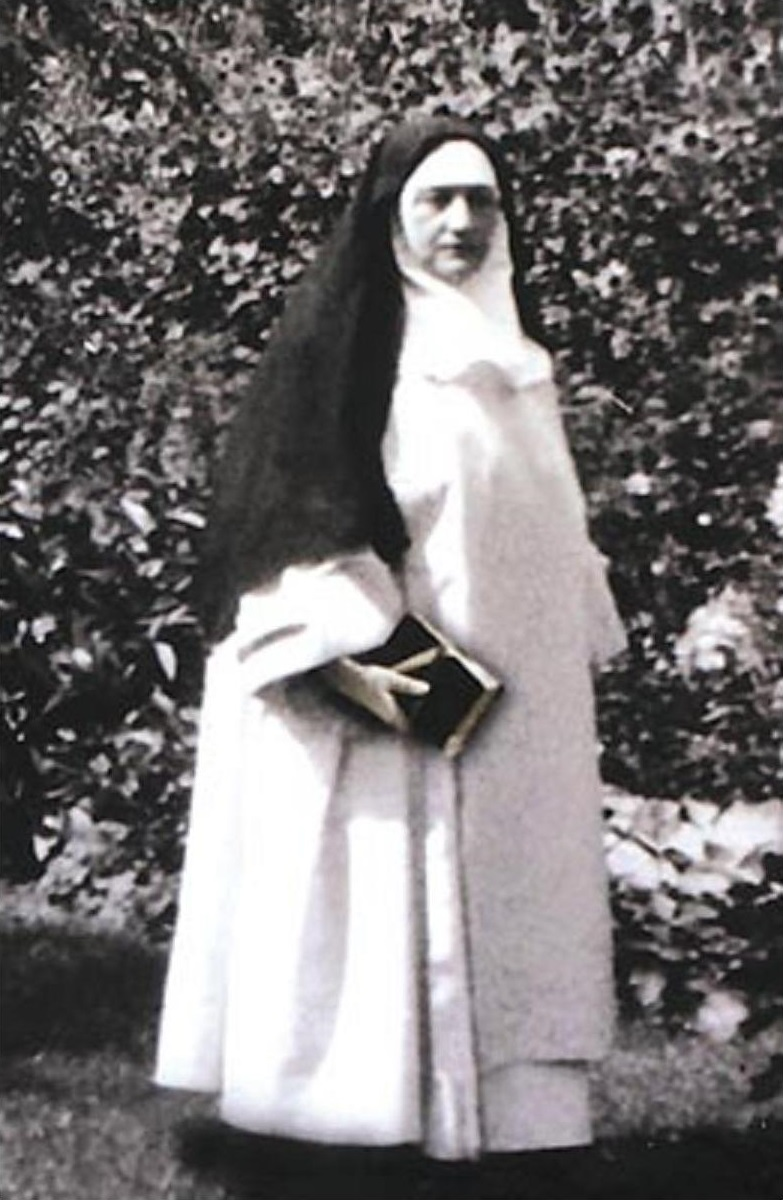
Magdalena Maria Epstein

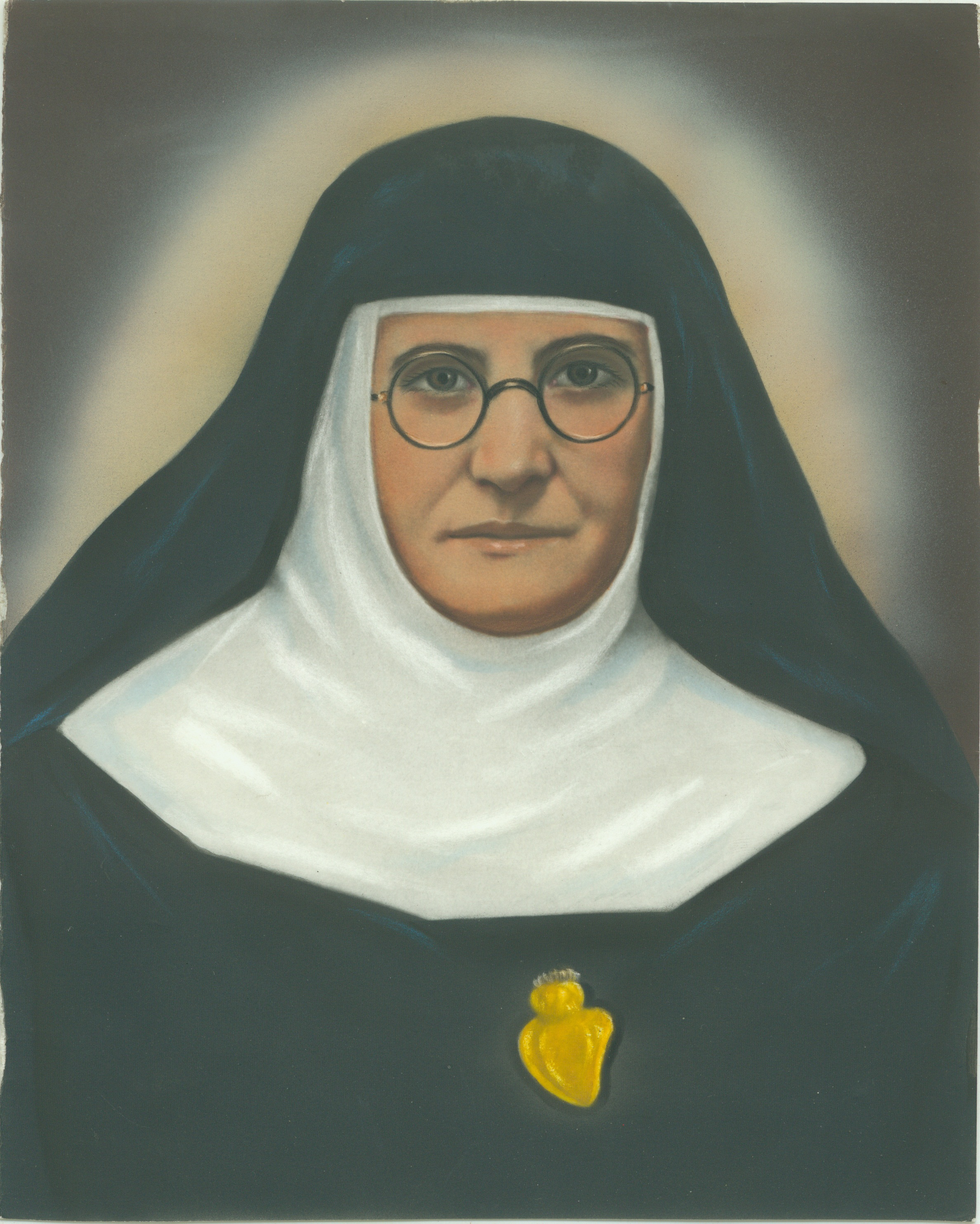
Trinidad Carreras Hitos

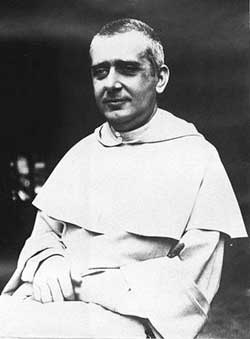
Jacek Woroniecki

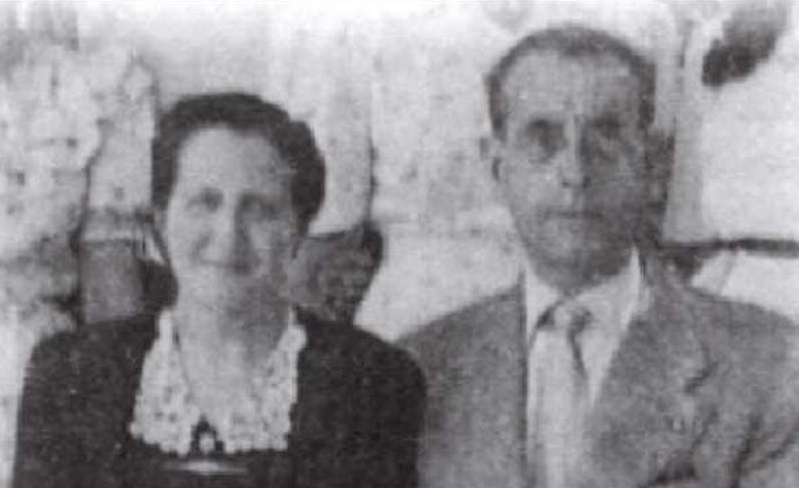
Manuel and Adela Casesnoves

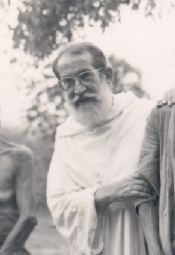
José Alvarez Fernández

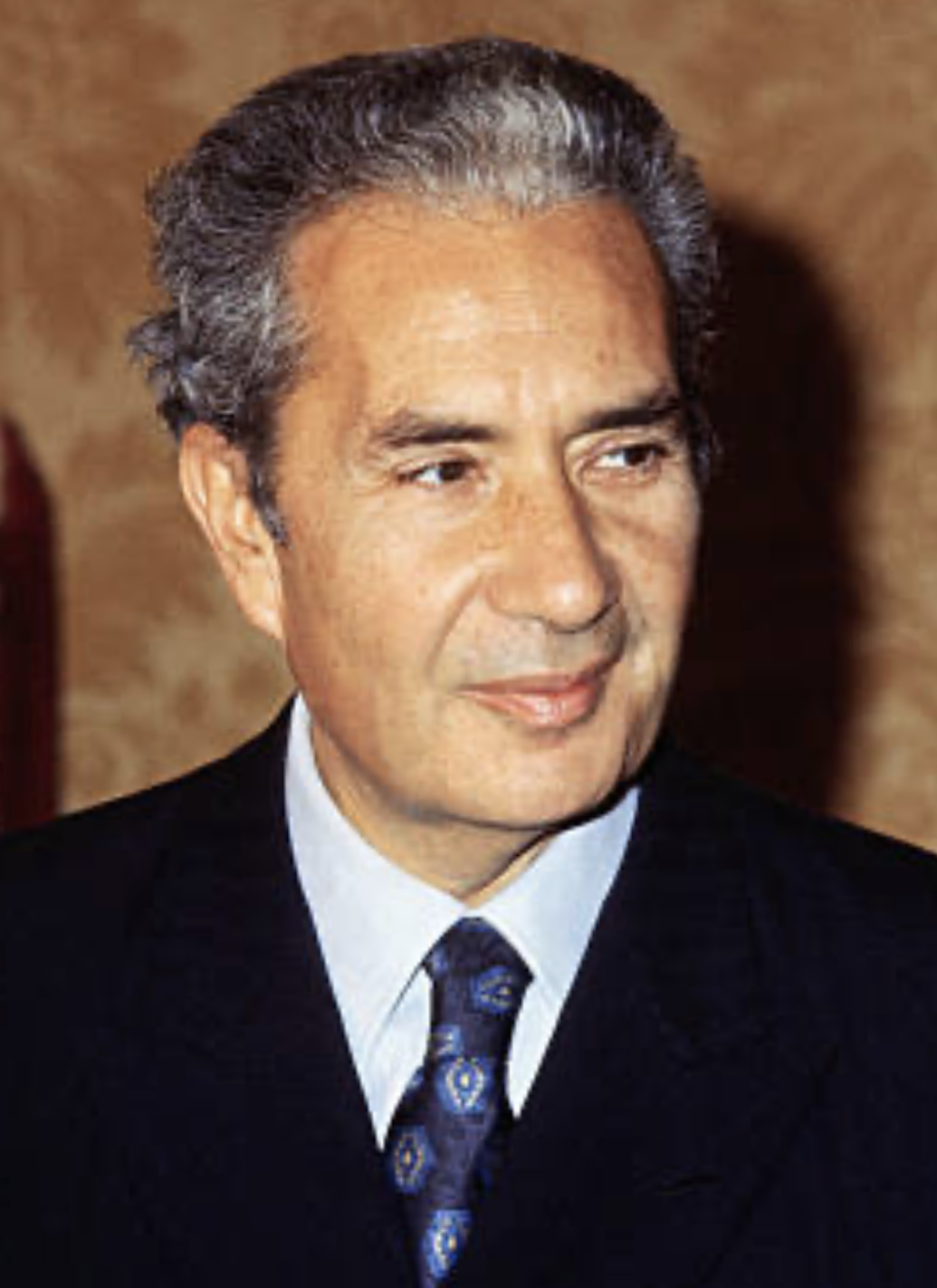
Aldo Moro

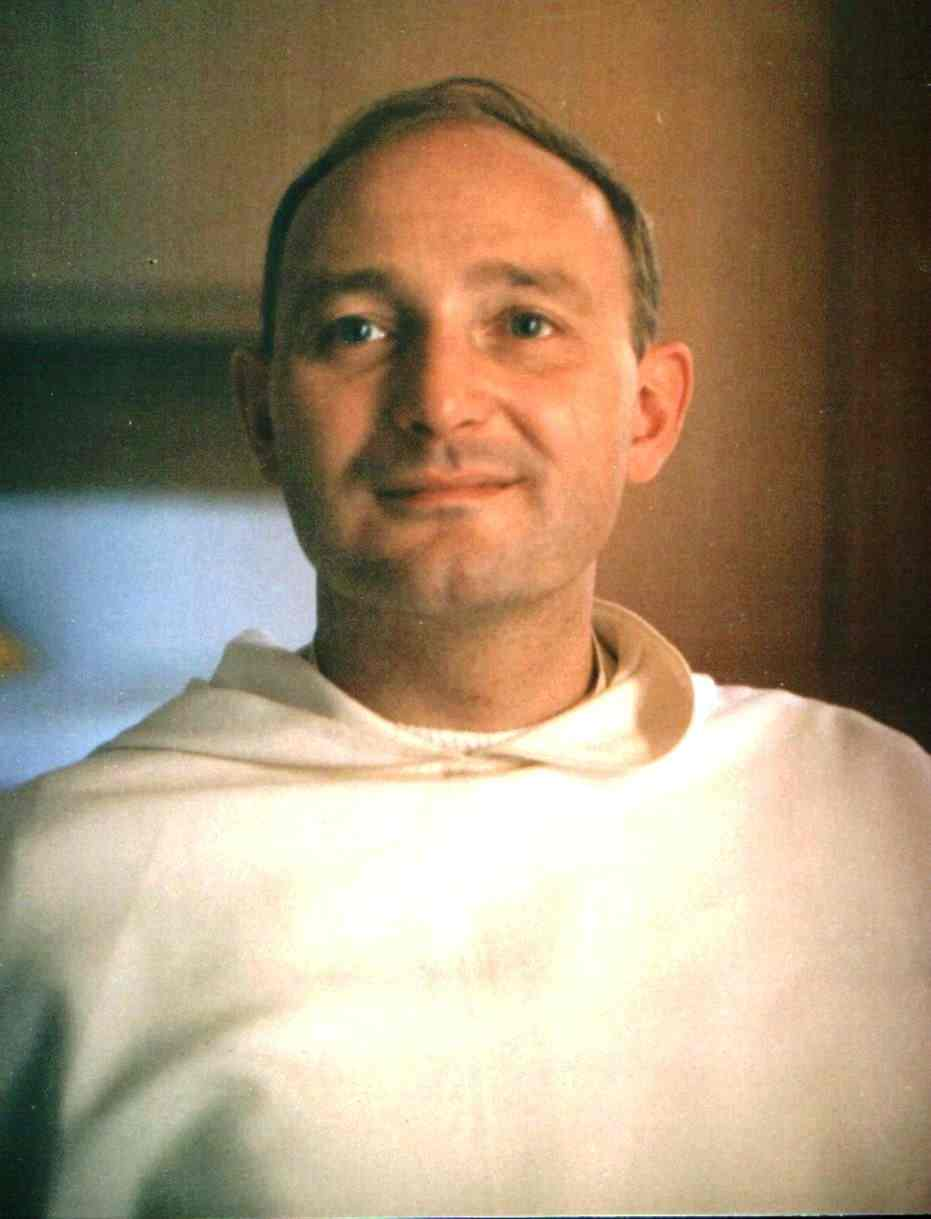
Tomáš Týn

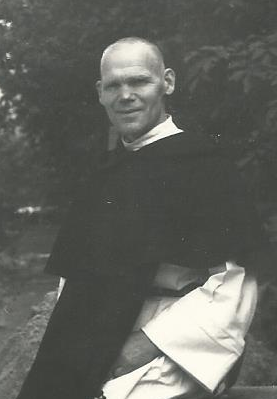
Gwala Torbiński

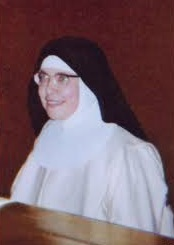
Maria Petra Giordano

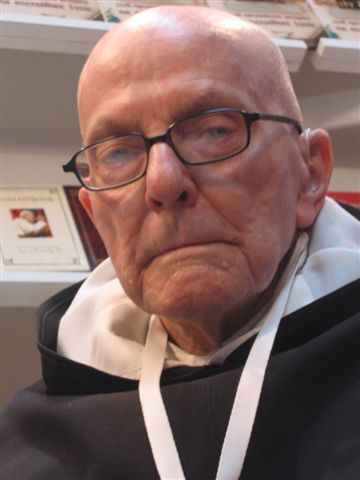
Joachim Badeni

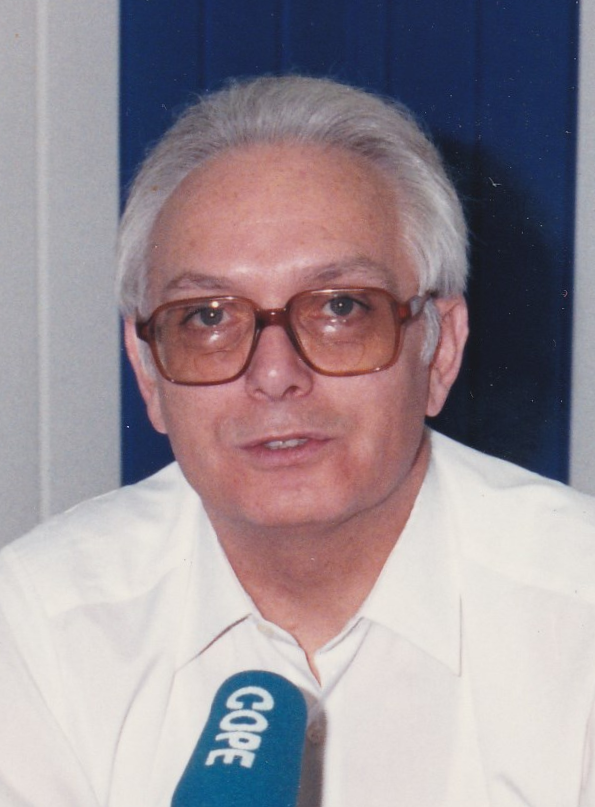
José Luis Gago de Val
- Françoise-Apolline Merlin (rel. name: Mère Saint Peter) (1803–1878), Professed Religious of the Dominican Sisters of Charity of the Presentation (France)
- Louise Nicolle (1847–1889), Layperson of the Diocese of Cambrai; Founder of the Humble Daughters of the Sacred Heart of Saint-Amand (now part of the Secular Institute of Saint Dominic) (France)
- Marie-Thérèse Farré (rel. name: Thérèse-Dominique of the Heart of Mary) (1830–1893), Founder of the Dominican Sisters of the Immaculate Heart of Mary (France)
- Françoise-Geneviève Portalet (rel. name: Hedwige) (1826–1894), Founder of the Dominican Sisters of the Immaculate Conception (France)
- Anna Moes (rel. name: Maria Dominika Klara of the Holy Cross) (1832–1895), Professed Religious of the Dominican Nuns (Luxembourg)
- Ángel José Toro (rel. name: Reginaldo of Saint Dominic) (1830–1904), Professed Priest of the Dominicans; Bishop of Córdoba; Founder of the Dominican Tertiary Sisters of Saint Joseph (Argentina)
- Marie Thérèse Joséphine Gand (rel. name: Mére Saint Dominic of the Cross) (1819–1907), Founder of the Dominican Sisters of the Saint Catherine of Siena of Étrépagny (France)
- José María Cueto Díez de la Maza (1839–1908), Professed Priest of the Dominicans; Bishop of Canarias; Founder of the Dominican Missionaries of the Holy Family (Spain)
- Maria Clotilde di Savoia Bonaparte (1843–1911), Married Layperson of the Archdiocese of Turin; Member of the Lay Dominicans (Italy)
- Elmina Paz de Gallo (rel. name: María Dominga of the Blessed Sacrament) (1833–1911), Widow; Founder of the Dominican Sisters of the Holy Name of Jesus (Argentina)
- Pauline Élisabeth Arrighi Leseur (1866–1914), Married Layperson of the Archdiocese of Paris (France)
- Juan María Riera Moscoso (1866–1915), Professed Priest of the Dominicans; Bishop of Guayaquil (Ecuador)
- Teresa Titos Garzón (1852–1915), Founder of the Sisters of Saint Dominic of Granada (Spain)
- Guido Negri (1888–1916), Layperson of the Diocese of Padua; Member of the Lay Dominicans (Italy)
- Ramón Zubieta Les (1864–1921), Professed Priest of the Dominicans; Bishop of Puerto Maldonado; Cofounder of the Missionary Dominican Sisters of the Rosary (Spain–Peru)
- Georgina Josefa Febres Cordero Troconis (1861–1925), Founder of the Dominican Sisters of Saint Rose of Lima (Venezuela)
- Giuseppina Berettoni (1875–1927), Layperson of the Vicariate of Rome; Member of the Secular Franciscans and Lay Dominicans (Italy)
- Gabriela Durán Párraga (rel. name: Gabriela of Saint Martin) (1848–1927), Cofounder of the Dominican Sisters of Saint Catherine of Siena of Colombia (Colombia)
- Juan Tomás González y González-Arintero (1860–1928), Professed Priest of the Dominicans (Spain)
- Anastasia Ilario (1859–1934), Layperson of the Archdiocese of Naples; Member of the Lay Dominicans (Italy)
- Anna Ivanovna Abrikosova (rel. name: Ekaterina Sienskaja) (1882–1936), Founder of the Sisters of the Third Order of Saint Dominic of the Russian Byzantine Catholic Rite; Martyr in odium fidei (Russia)
- Tilde Manzotti (1915–1939), Young Layperson of the Diocese of Fiesole; Member of the Lay Dominicans (Italy)
- Albert Lagrange (rel. name: Marie-Joseph) (1855–1938), Professed Priest of the Dominicans (France)
- Ernestina Luisa Maria Arcucci (rel. name: Giuseppina) (1860–1940), Founder of the Sisters of the Holy Spirit (Italy)
- Toussaint Vayssière (rel. name: Marie-Étienne) (1864–1940), Professed Priest of the Dominicans (France)
- Wilhelm Finnemann (1882–1942), Professed Priest of the Society of the Divine Word; Apostolic Vicar of Calapan; Martyr in odium fidei (Germany–Philippines)
- Elena Giacobini (rel. name: Maria Giuseppa) (1864–1944), Professed Religious of the Dominican Nuns (Italy)
- Maria Italia Pescosolido (1916–1944), Professed Religious of the Sisters of the Poor of Saint Catherine of Siena (Italy)
- José María Zapico Díaz (1883–1945), Professed Priest of the Dominicans (Spain–Venezuela)
- Nedjeljko Barač (rel. name: Dominik) (1912–1945), Professed Priest of the Dominicans; Martyr in odium fidei (Croatia)
- Luisa Piccarreta (1865–1947), Layperson of the Archdiocese of Trani-Barletta-Bisceglie; Member of the Lay Dominicans (Italy)
- Assunta Viscardi (1890–1947), Layperson of the Archdiocese of Bologna; Founder of the Work of Saint Dominic for the Children of Divine Providence (Italy)
- Magdalena Maria Epstein (1875–1947), Professed Religious of the Dominican Nuns (Poland)
- Adam Woroniecki (rel. name: Jacek) (1878–1949), Professed Priest of the Dominicans; Founder of the Missionary Dominican Sisters of Jesus and Mary (Poland)
- Maria Jang Jeong-eon (rel. name: Maria Agneta) (1906–1950), Professed Religious of the Maryknoll Sisters of Saint Dominic; Martyr in odium fidei (South Korea–North Korea)
- Carme Sala Bigas (rel. name: Maria Lourdes) (1920–1952), Professed Religious of the Dominican Nuns (Spain)
- Ana de la Torre Guerrero (rel. name: María Rosa) (1880–1958), Founder of the Dominican Sisters of Saint Thomas Aquinas (Mexico)
- Manuel Casesnoves Soler (1904–1958) and Adela Soldevila Galiana de Casesnoves (1906–1988), Married Laypersons of the Archdiocese of Valencia; Member of the Lay Dominicans (Spain)
- Élise Bisschop (1925–1969), Layperson of the Diocese of Sens-Auxerre; Member of the Lay Dominicans (France)
- Agatina Balsamo (rel. name: Giuseppina) (1887–1969), Professed Religious of the Dominican Sisters of the Sacred Heart (Italy)
- José Álvarez Fernández [Apaktone] (1890–1970), Professed Priest of the Dominicans (Spain–Peru)
- Teresa Ortega Pardo (rel. name: Teresa María of Jesus) (1917–1972), Professed Religious of the Dominican Nuns (Spain)
- Ermelinda Rigon (rel. name: Maria Benedetta of the Blessed Sacrament) (1889–1973), Founder of the Sisters of the Dominican Cenacle (Italy)
- José Heliades María Higuera Barrera (rel. name: Enrique Alberto) (1906–1976), Professed Priest of the Dominicans; Cofounder of the Dominican Daughters of Our Lady of Nazareth (Colombia)
- Cristina María Benito Rivas (rel. name: Dominga) (1900–1977), Professed Religious of the Dominican Sisters of the Annunciata (Spain)
- Aldo Moro (1916–1978), Married Layperson of the Vicariate of Rome; Member of the Lay Dominicans (Italy)
- María Sara Alvarado Pontón (1902–1980), Founder of the Dominican Daughters of Our Lady of Nazareth (Colombia)
- Mary Elizabeth "Maura" Clarke (1931–1980) and Ita Catherine Ford (1940–1980), Professed Religious of the Maryknoll Sisters of Saint Dominic; Martyr in odium fidei (United States–El Salvador)
- Alain-Marie du Noday (1899–1985), Professed Priest of the Dominicans; Bishop of Porto Nacional (France–Brazil)
- María Benedicta Daiber Heyne (1904–1987), Layperson of the Archdiocese of Barcelona (Spain)
- Terencio María Huguet Montoro (1907–1987), Professed Priest of the Dominicans (Spain–Guatemala)
- Tomáš Josef Maria Týn (1950–1990), Professed Priest of the Dominicans (Czechia–Germany)
- Giovanni Galluzzi (rel. name: Domenico) (1906–1992), Professed Priest of the Dominicans (Italy)
- María Belen Guzmán Florit (rel. name: Dominga) (1897–1993), Founder of the Dominican Sisters of Fatima (Puerto Rico)
- Aurelia [Leletta] Oreglia d'Isola (1926–1993), Layperson of the Diocese of Aosta; Member of the Lay Dominicans (Italy)
- Julienne Dallaire (rel. name: Julienne du Rosaire) (1911–1995), Founder of the Dominican Missionary Adorers (Canada)
- Walenty Torbiński (rel. name: Gwala) (1908–1999), Professed Religious of the Dominicans (Poland)
- Nicoletta Giordano (rel. name: Maria Petra) (1912–2006), Professed Religious of the Dominican Nuns (Italy)
- Kazimierz Stanisław Badeni (rel. name: Joachim) (1912–2010), Professed Priest of the Dominicans (Belgium–Poland)
- José Luis Gago del Val (1934–2012), Professed Priest of the Dominicans (Spain)

== Candidates for sainthood ==
This list includes those for whom there are public petitions to bishops to commence an investigation into the heroic virtues and martyrdom of individuals leading to a decree declaring them to be a Servant of God.

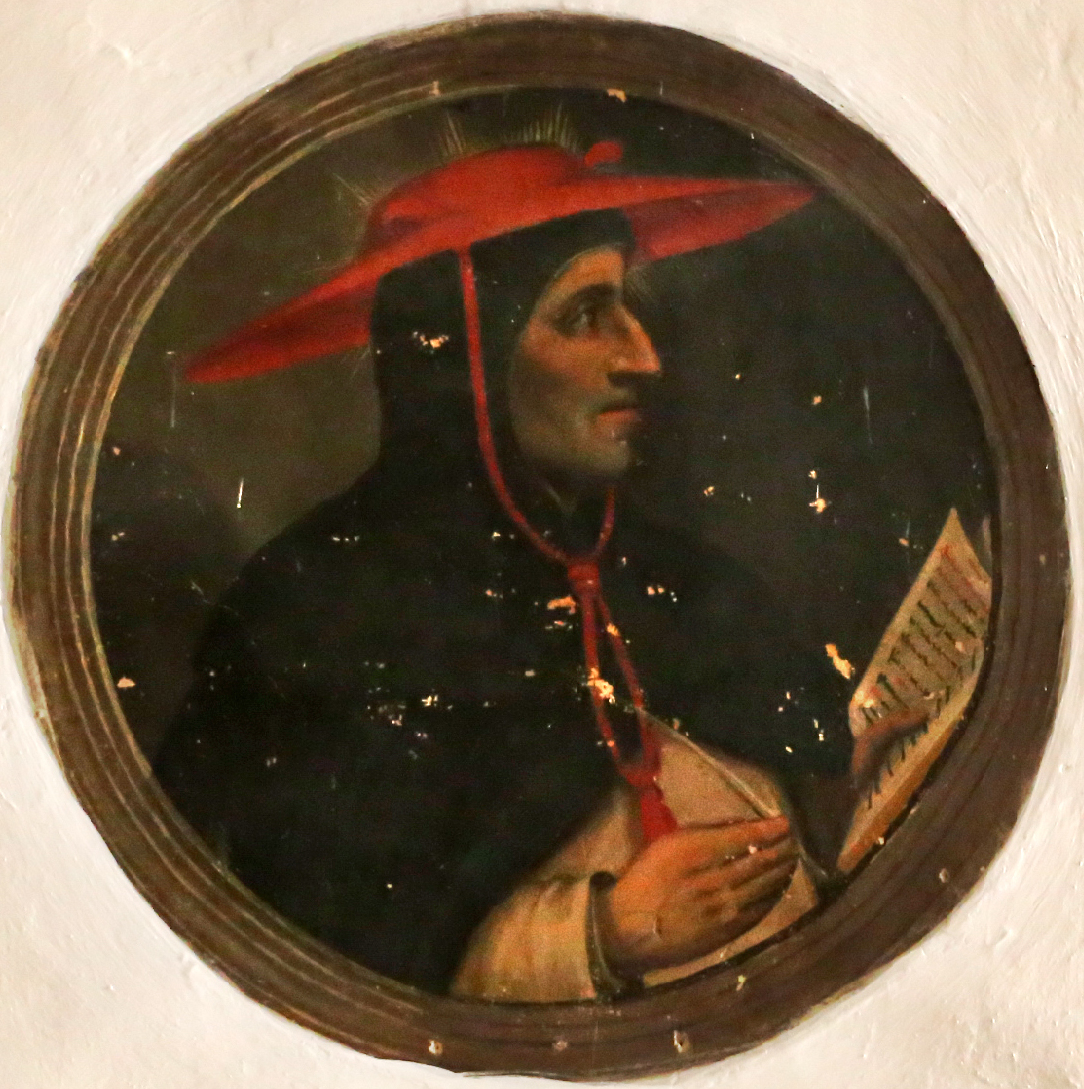
Hugo de Saint-Cher

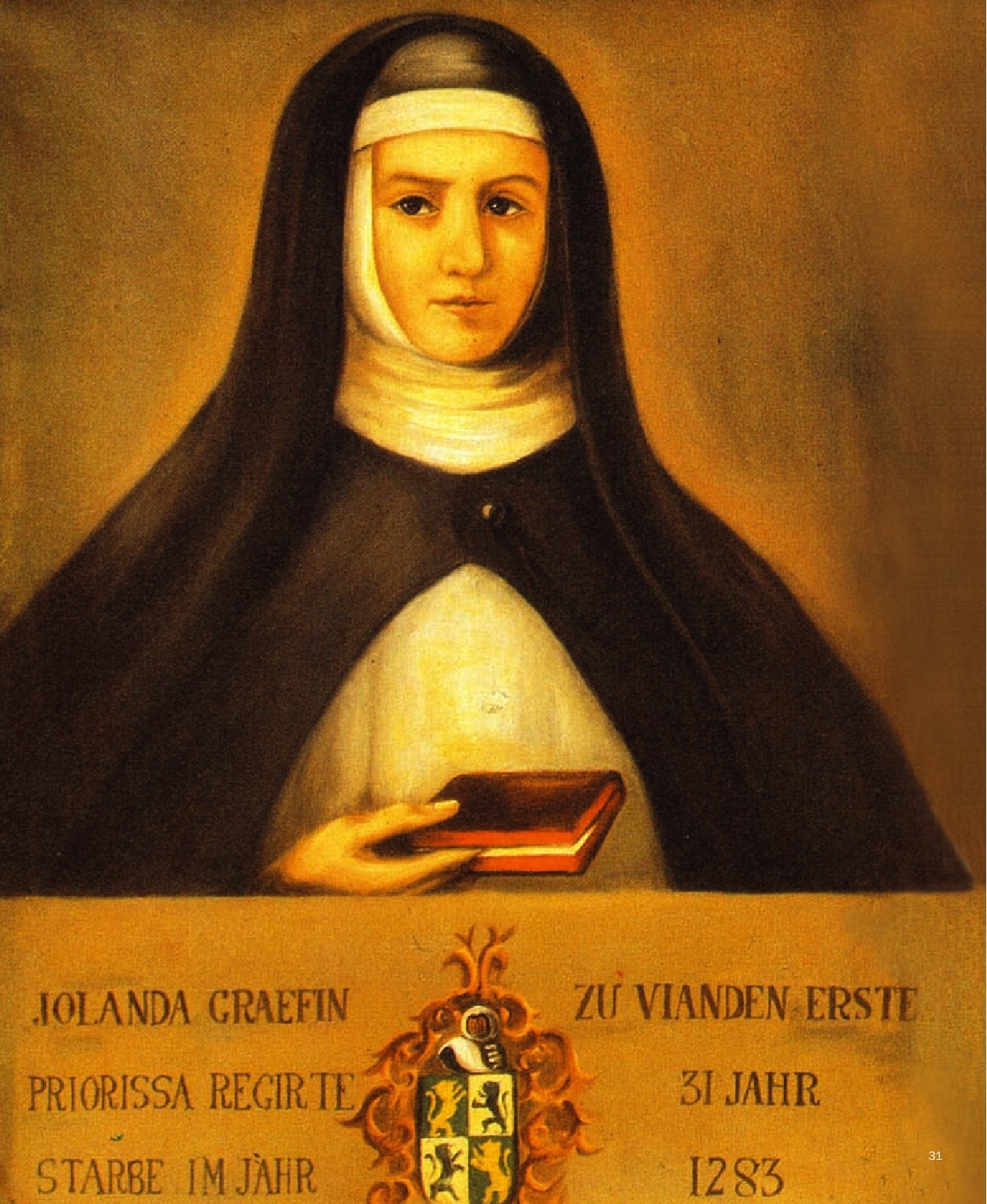
Yoland von Vianden

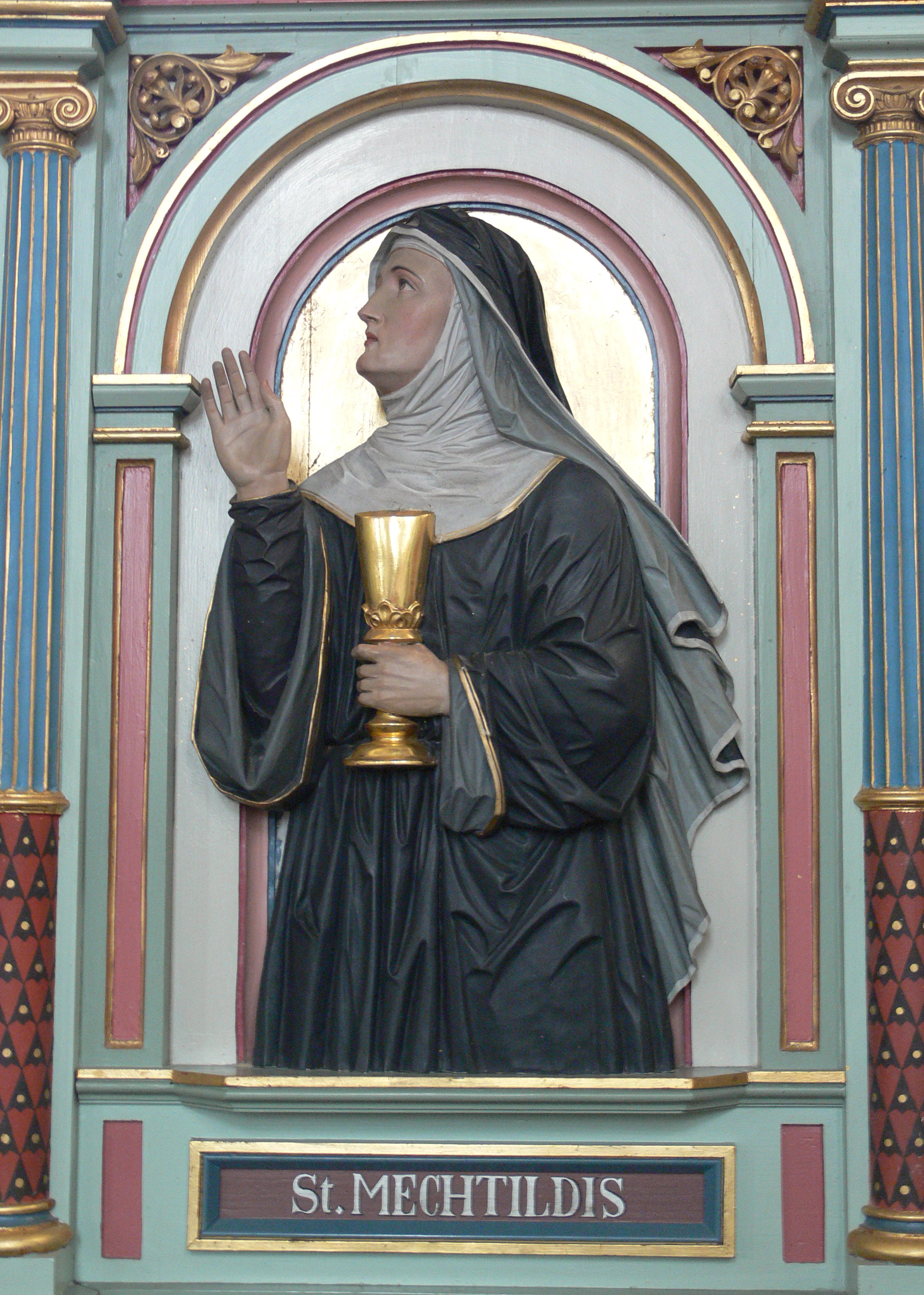
Mechthild of Magdeburg

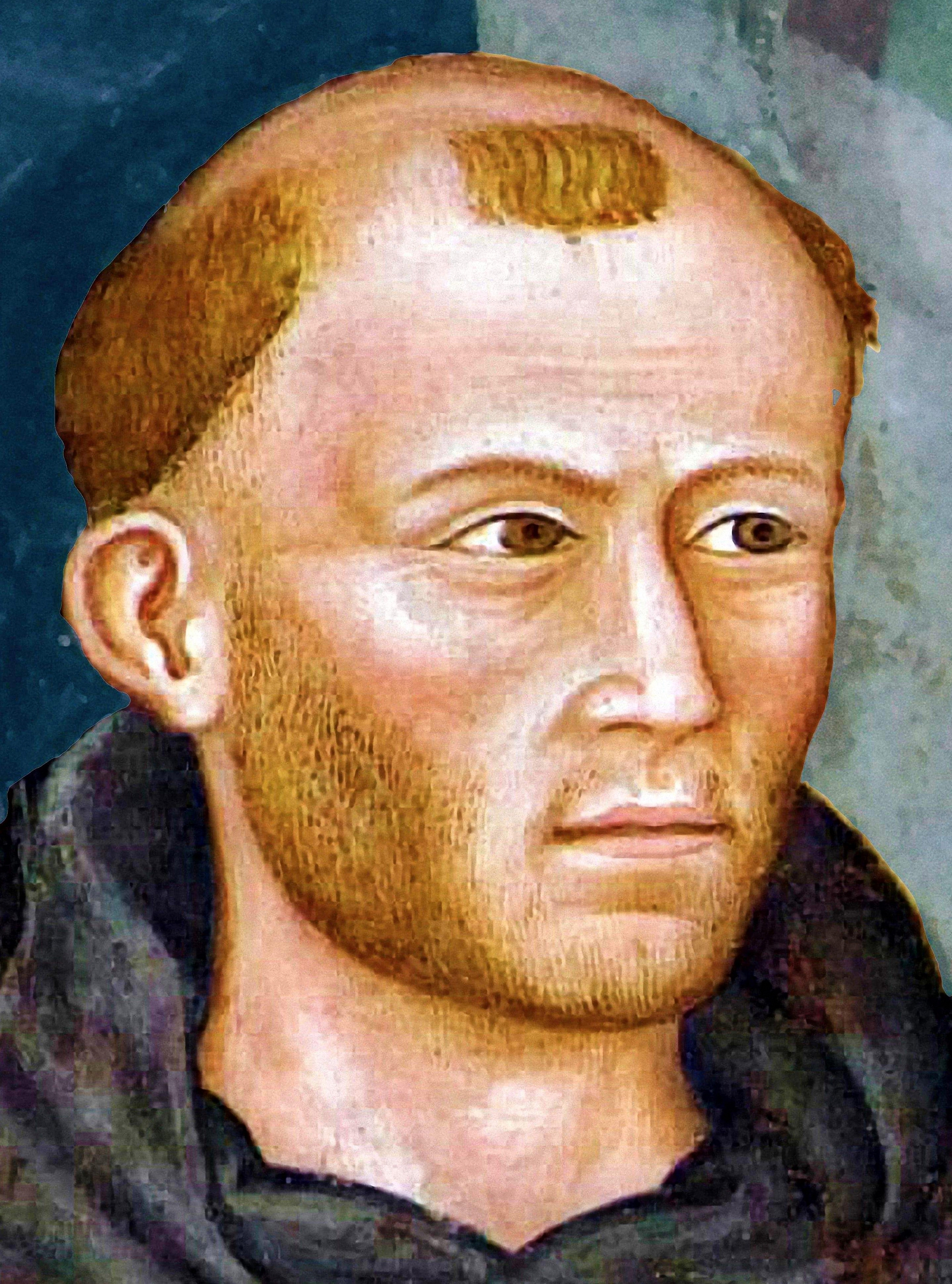
Eckhart von Hochheim

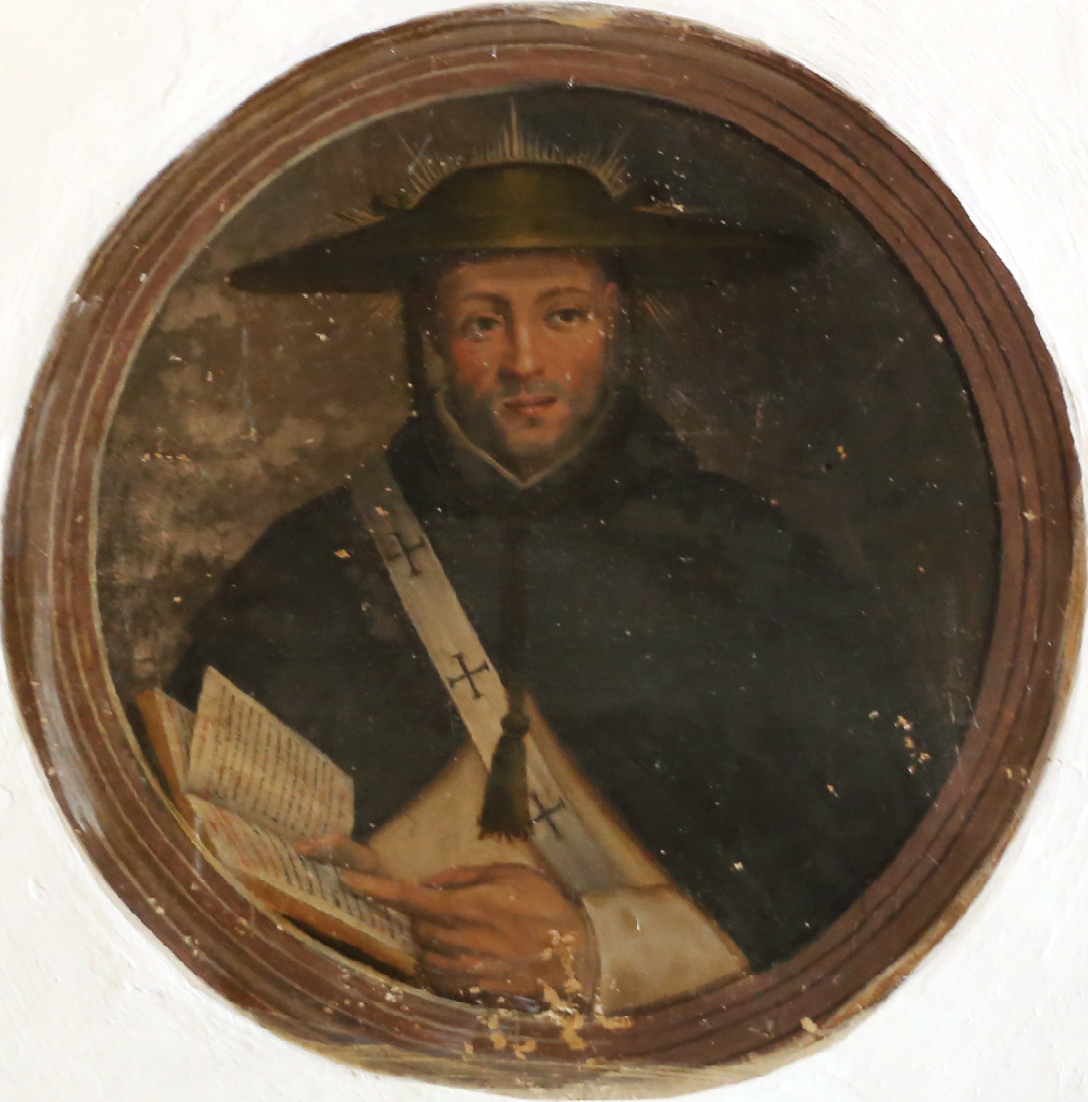
Pierre de la Palud

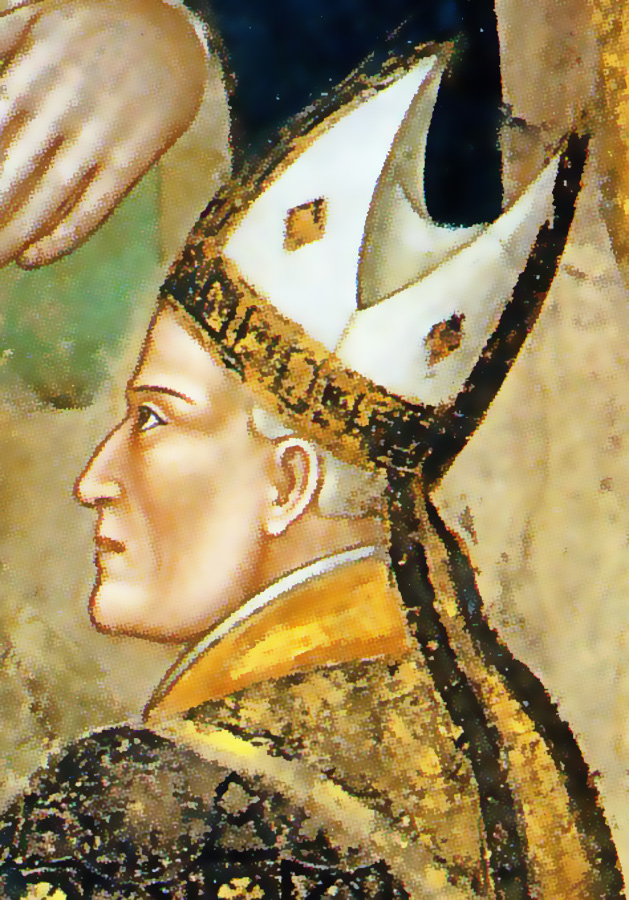
Simone Saltarelli

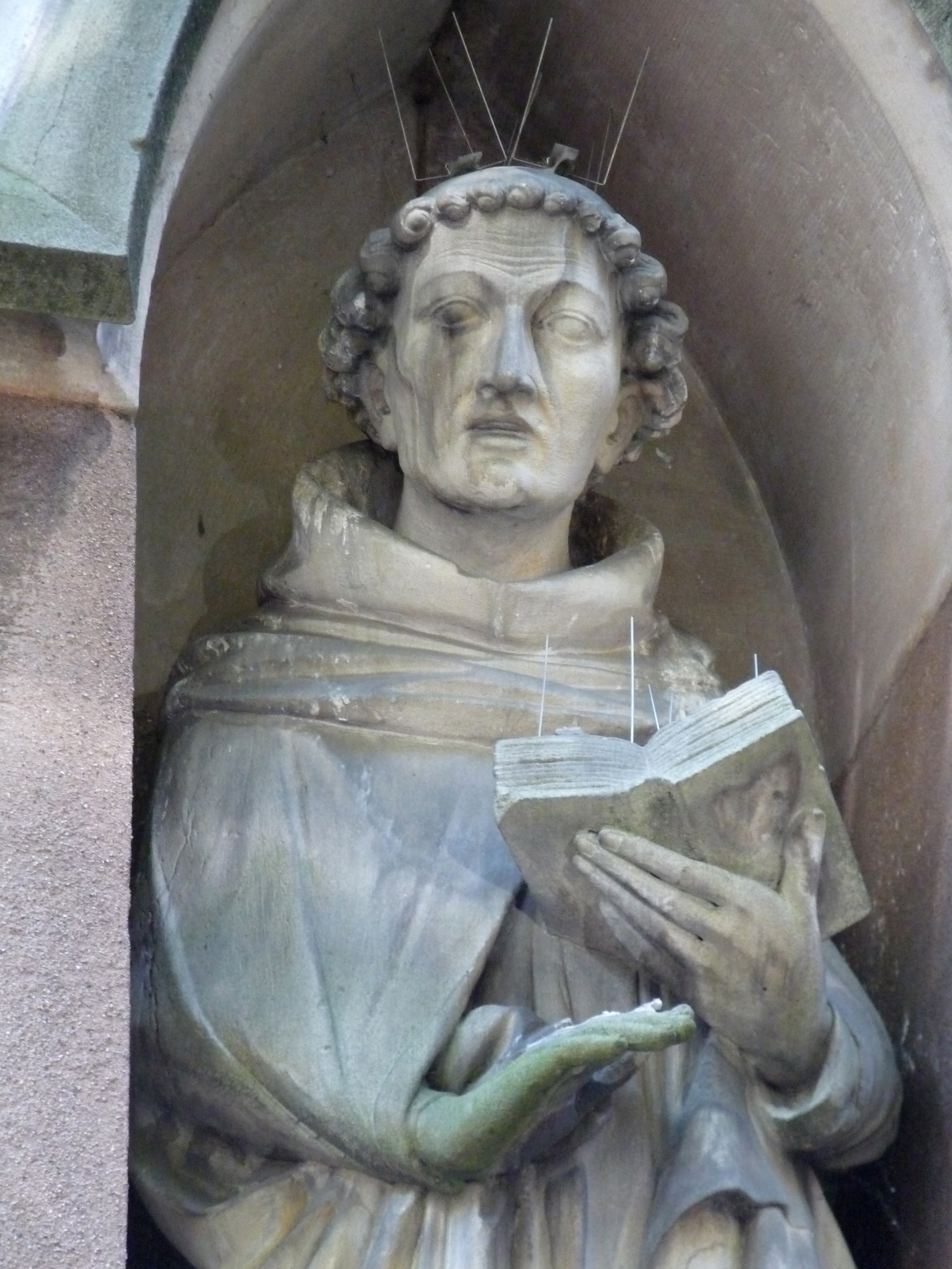
Johannes Tauler

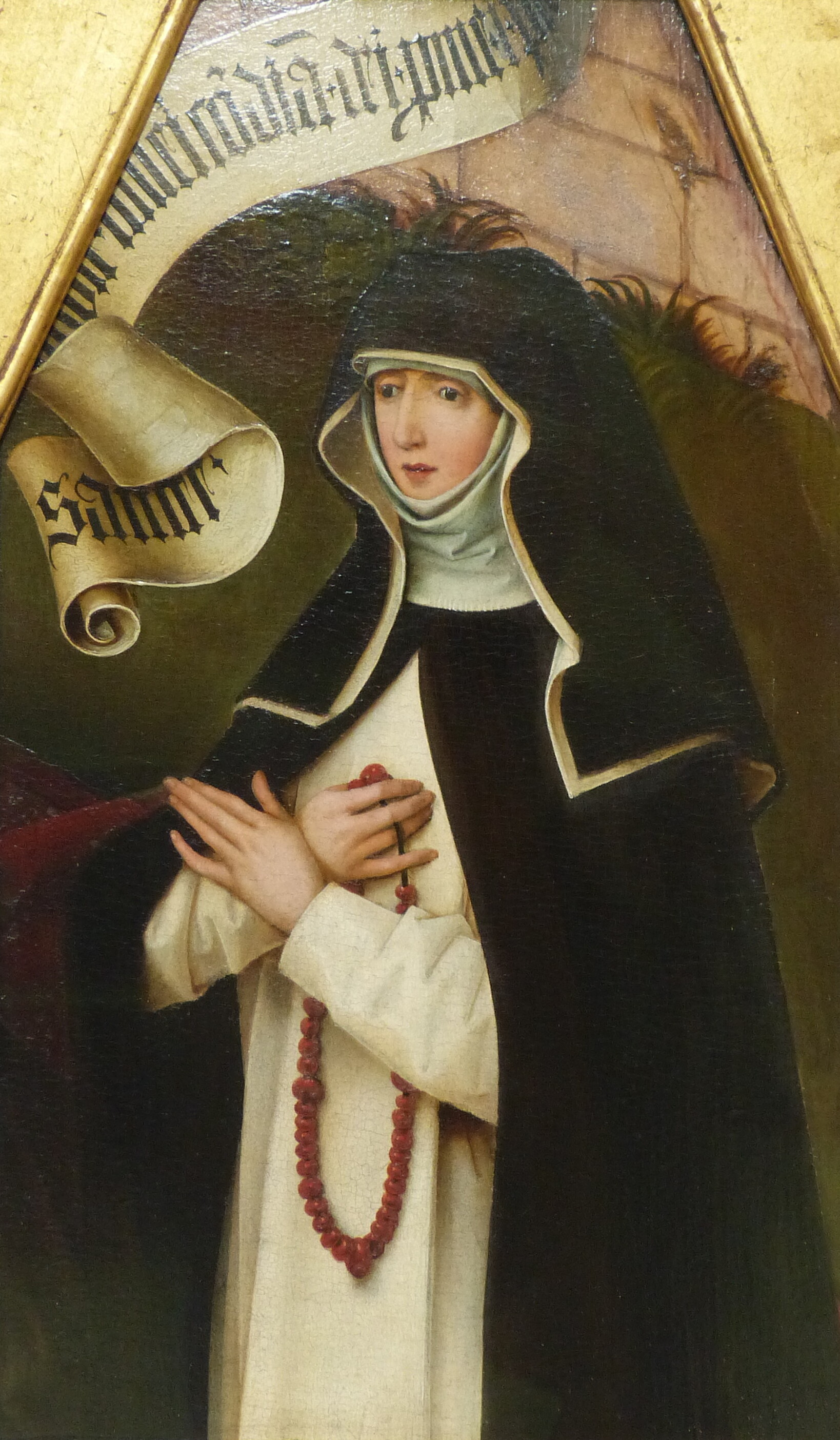
Veronika Wesler

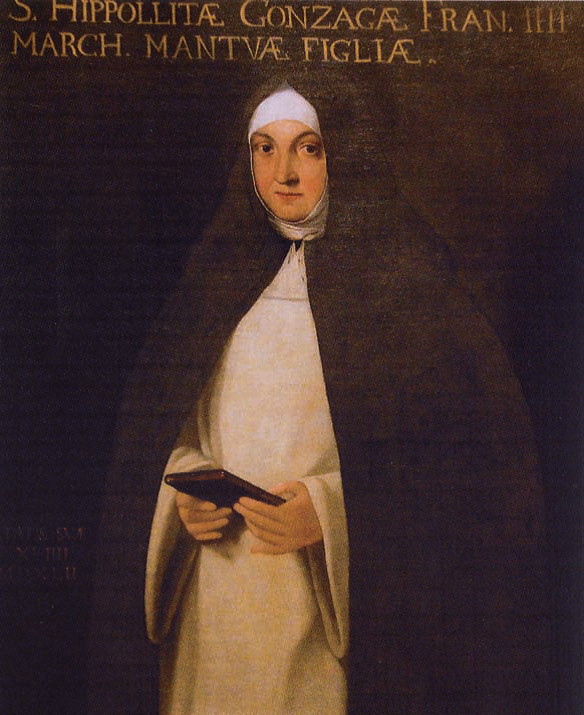
Livia Osanna Gonzaga

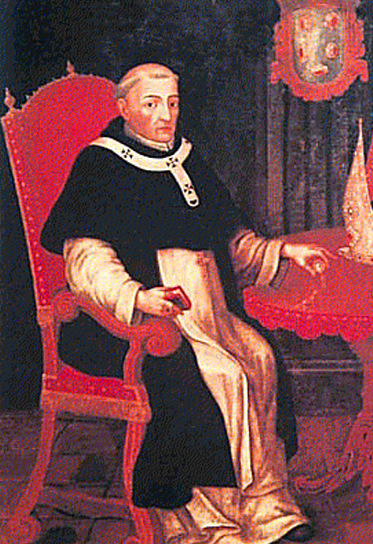
Jerónimo de Loayza González

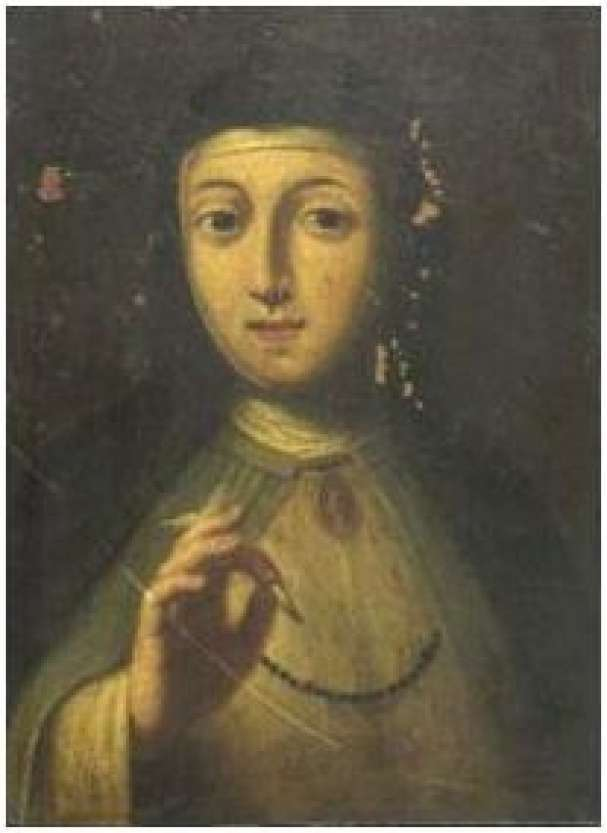
Plautilla Nelli

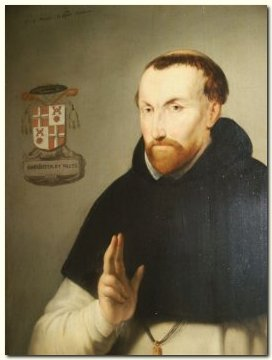
Bp. Godfried van Mierlo

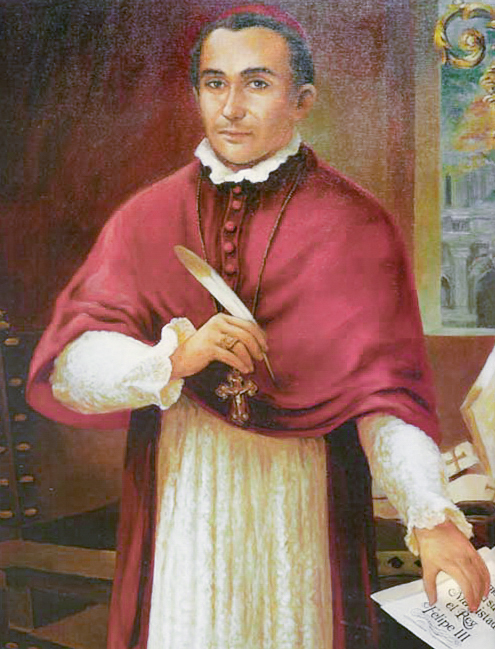
Bp. Miguel de Benavides

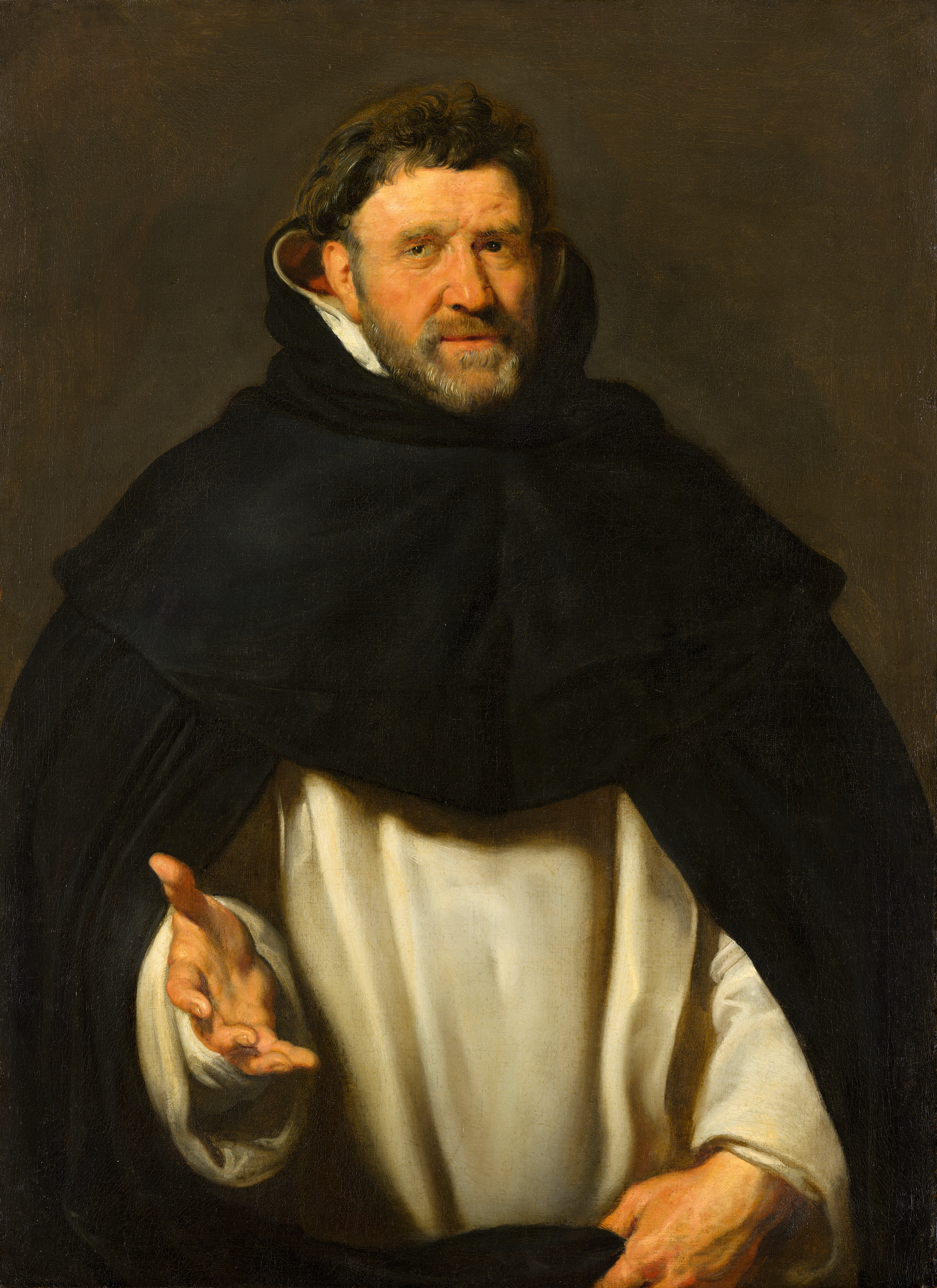
Michael von Ophoven

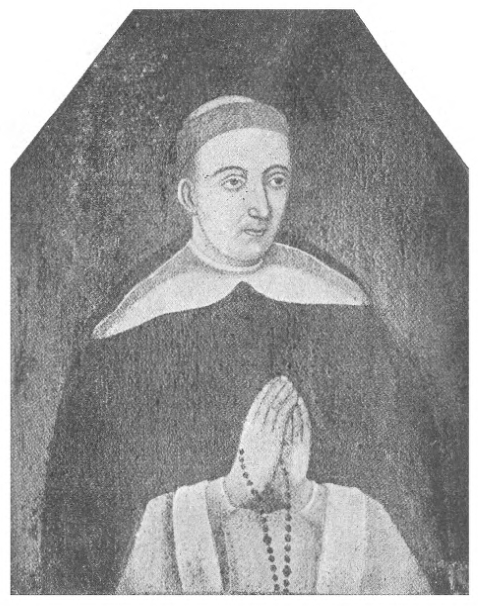
Fabian Maliszowski

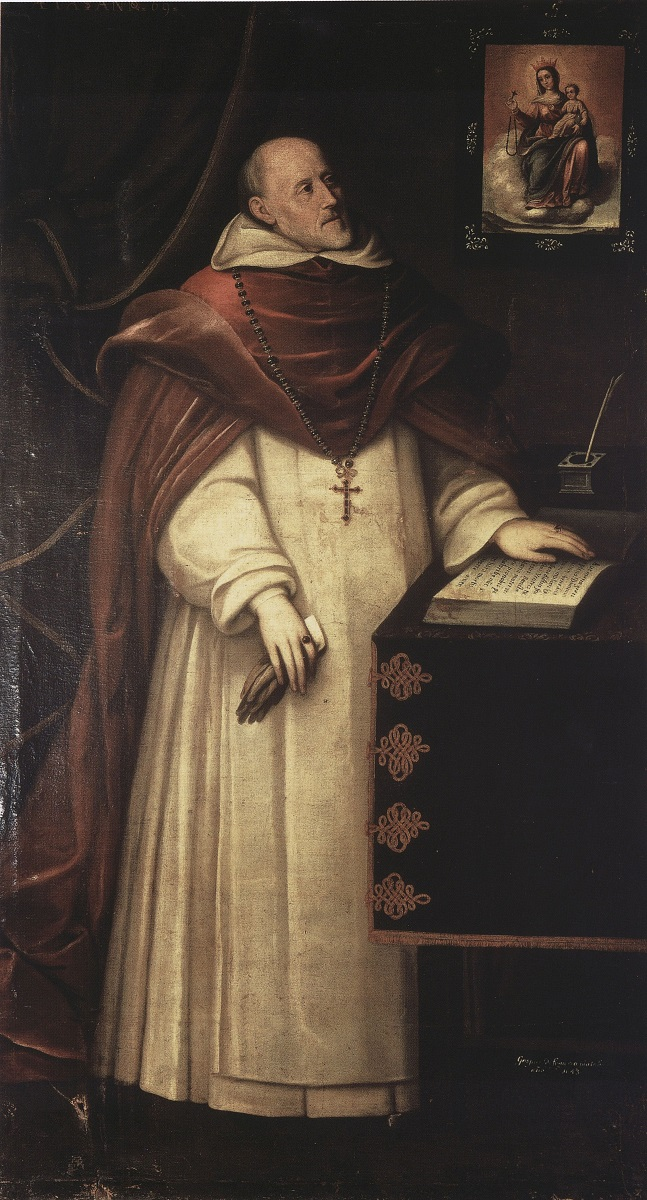
Abp. Cristóbal de Torres Motones

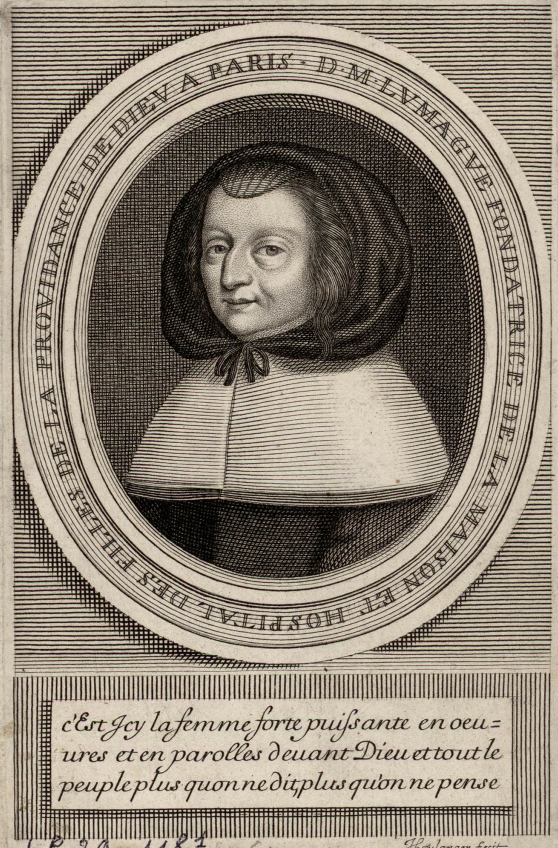
Marie Lumague

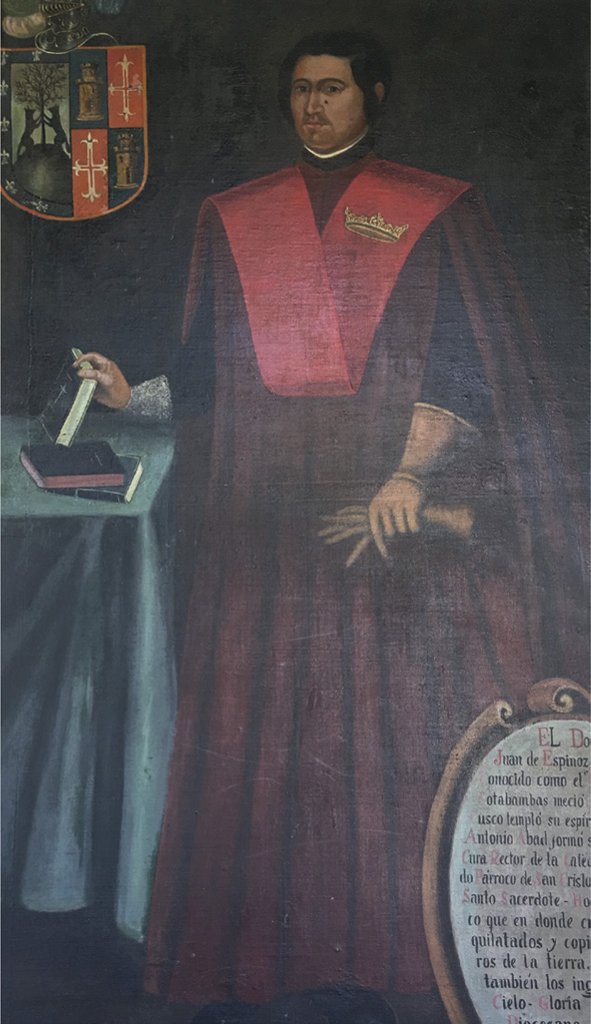
Juan de Espinosa Medrano

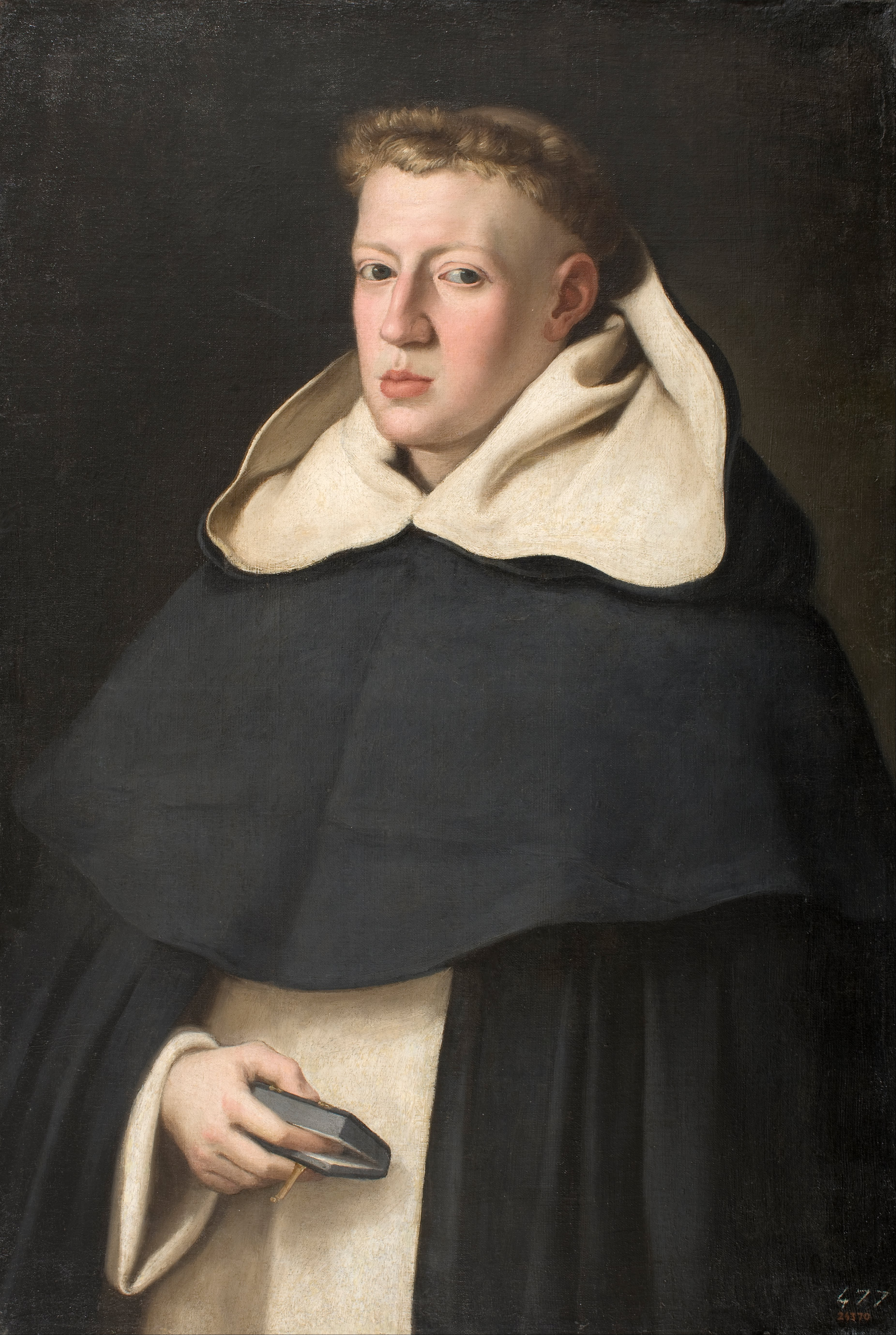
Alonso Enríquez de Guzmán

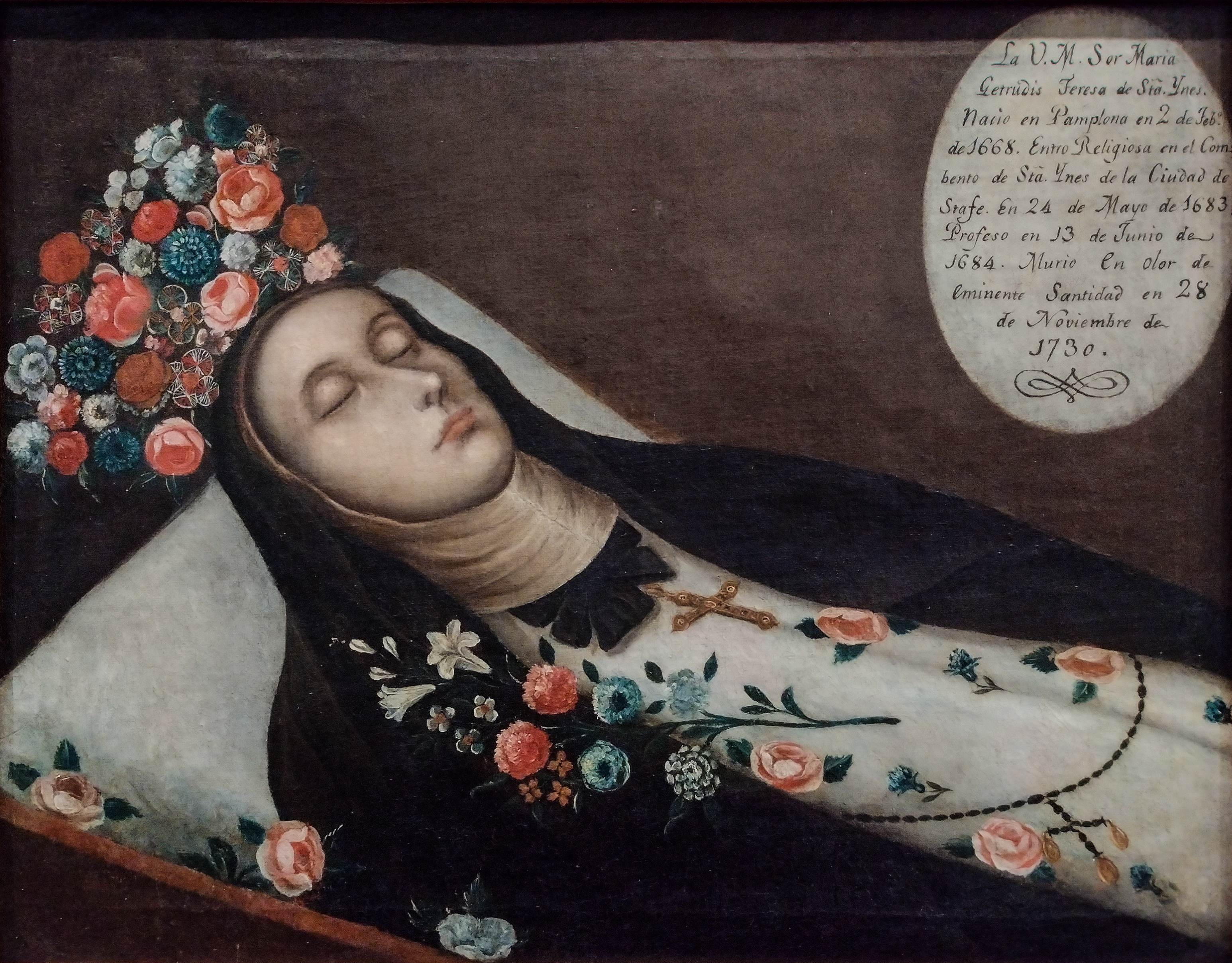
María Gertrudis Teresa de Santa Inés

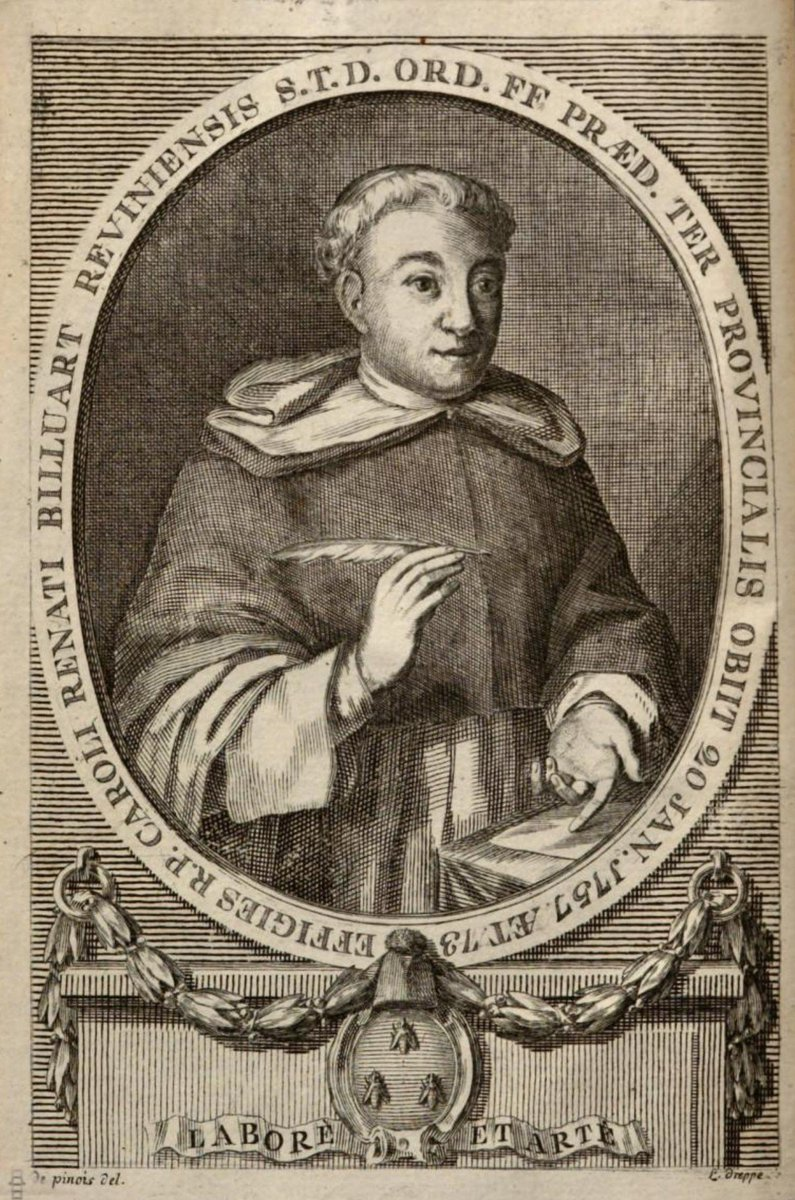
Charles-René Billuart

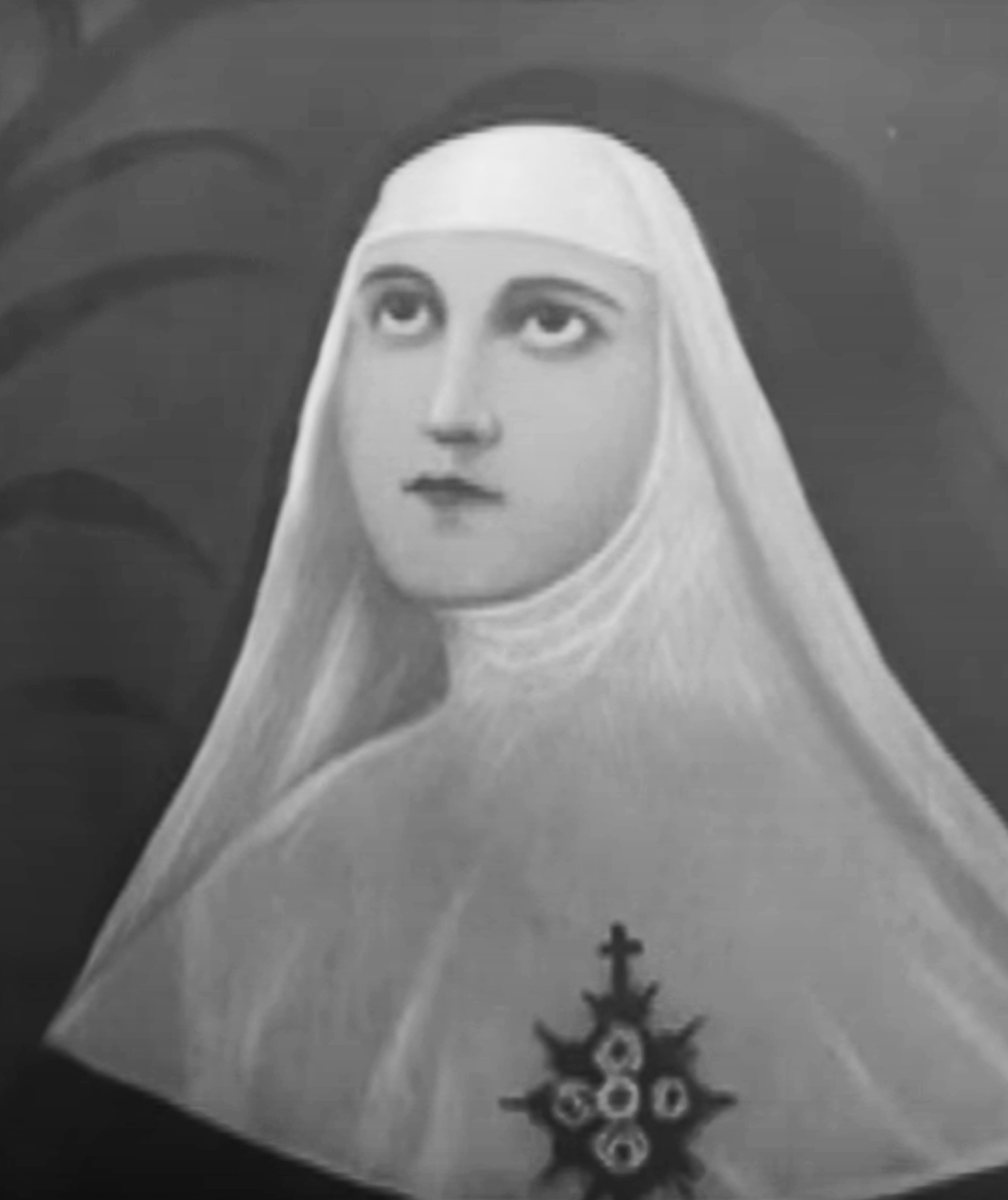
Catalina de Jesús Herrera

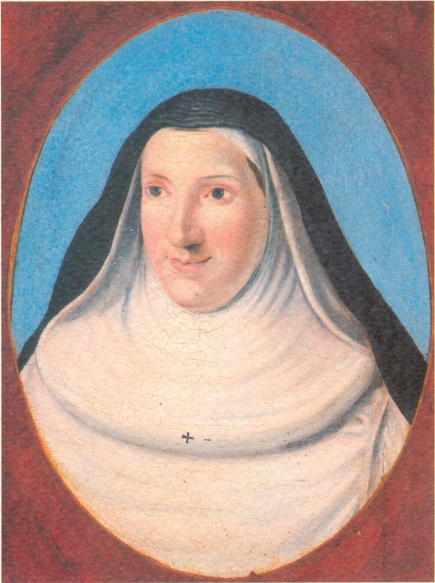
Giacinta Domenica di Bourbon-Parma

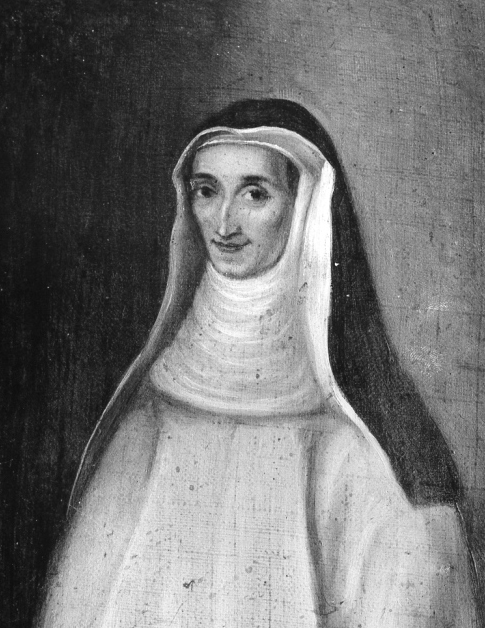
Anna Vittoria Dolara

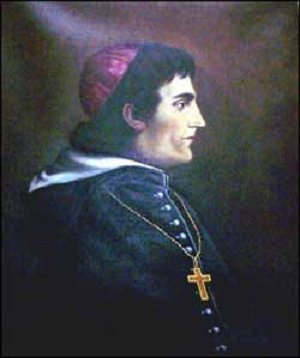
Bp. Edward Fenwick

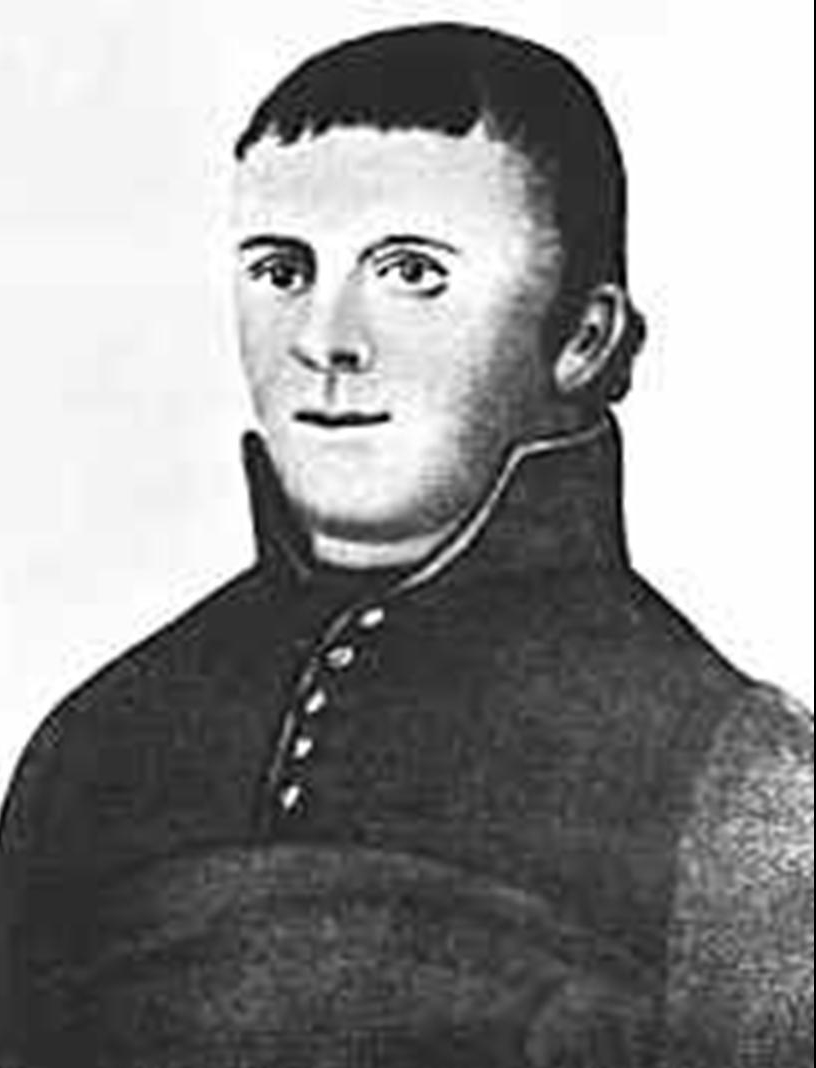
Theodore van den Broek

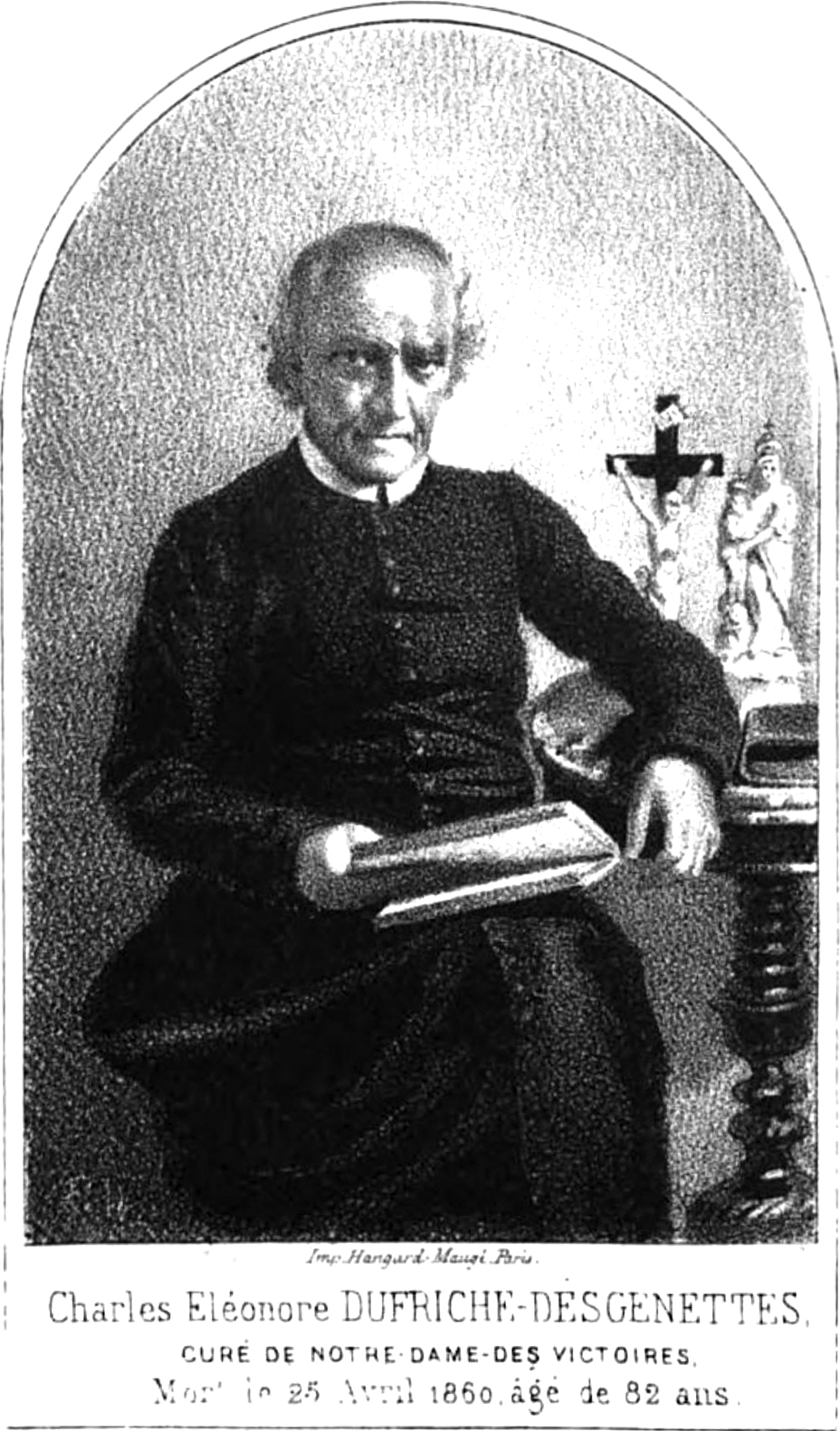
Charles-Éléonore Dufriche-Desgenettes

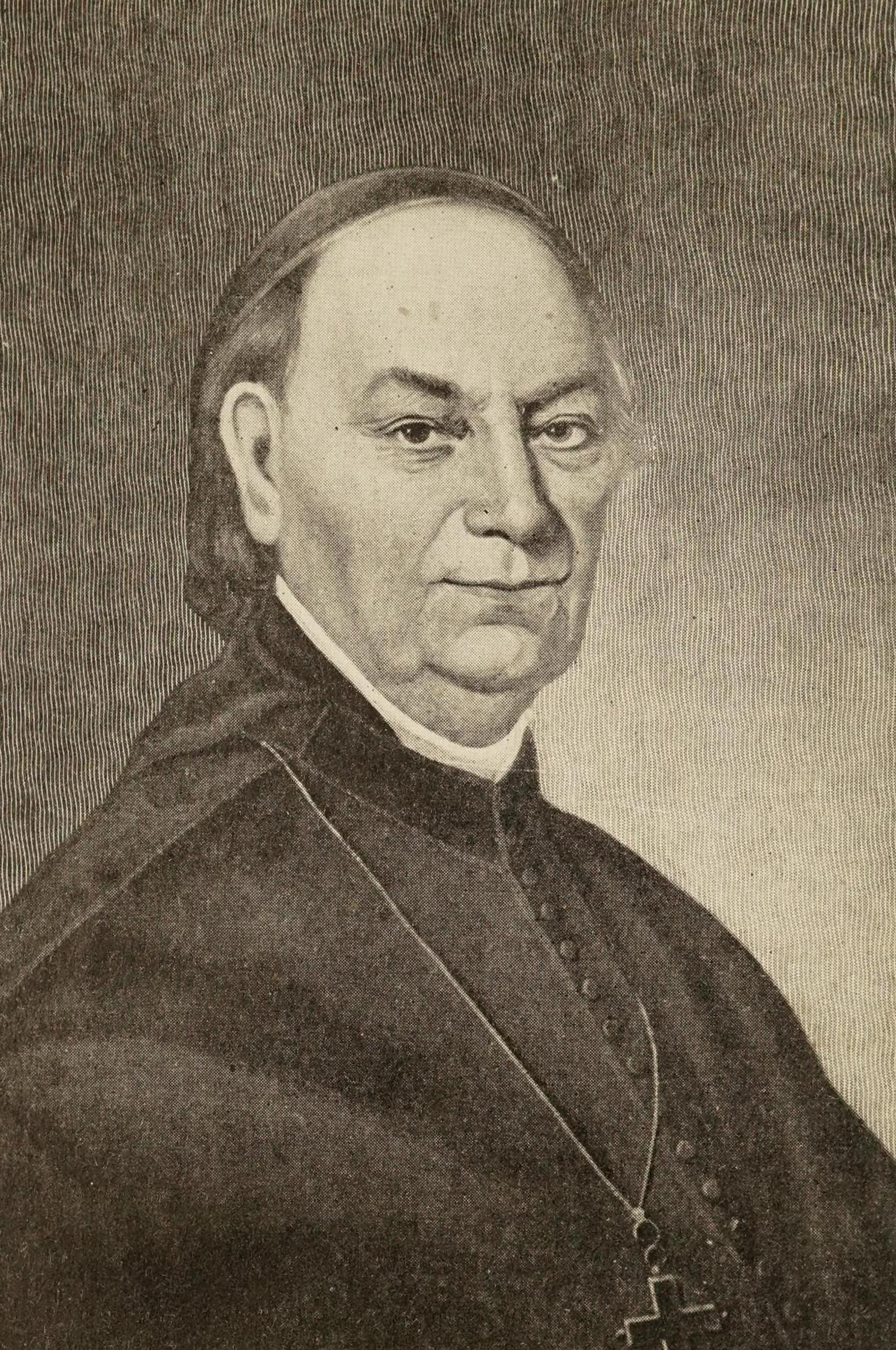
Bp. Richard Pius Miles

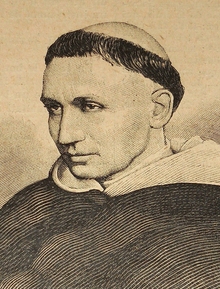
Hyacinthe Besson

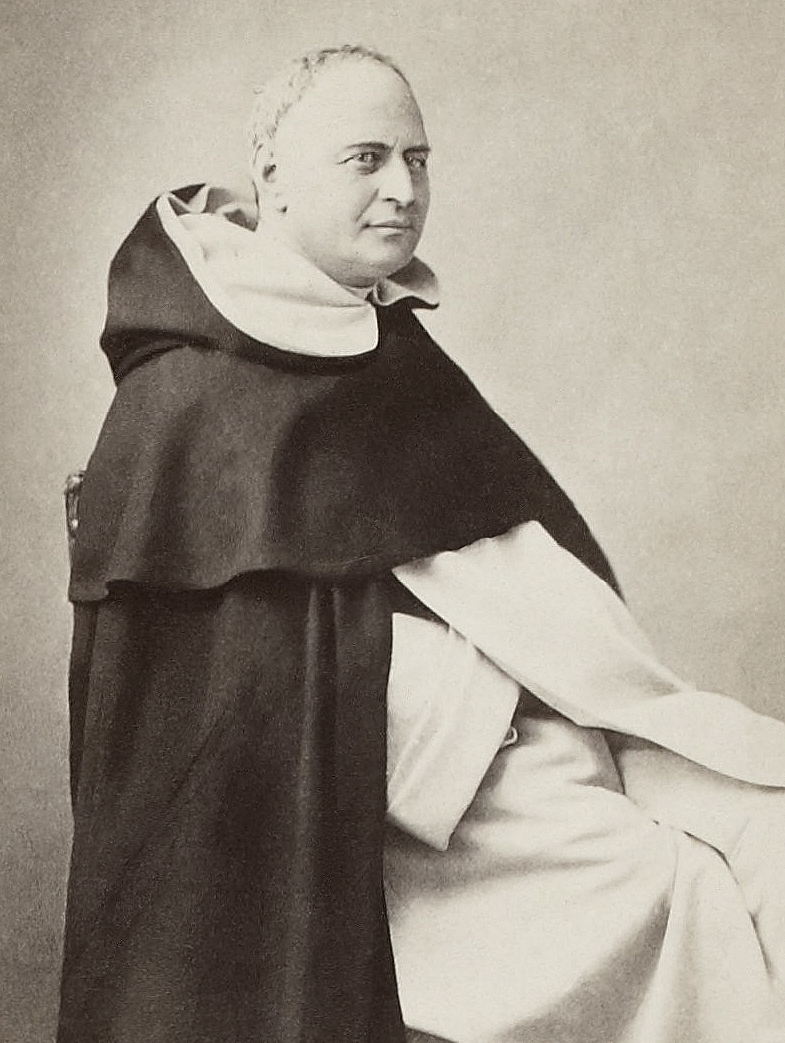
Jean-Baptiste Henri Lacordaire

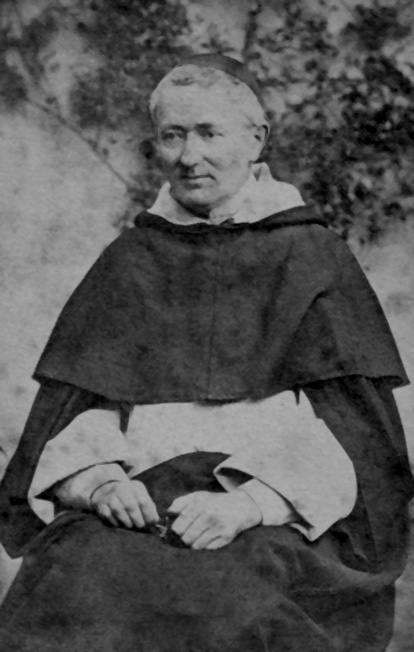
Alexandre Vincent Jandel

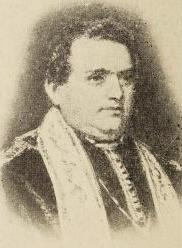
Bp. James Whelan

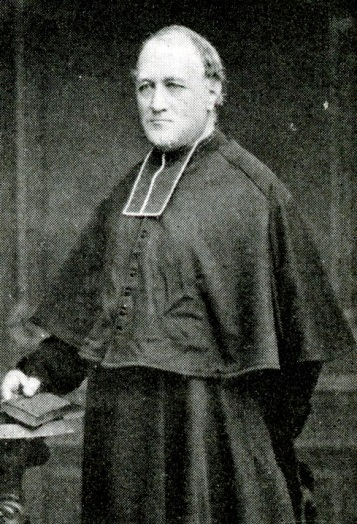
Victor Chocarne
- Antonio de Guzmán (c. 1164–1234), Priest of the Diocese of Osma-Soria; Member of the Dominican Fraternity of Priests (Spain)
- Marguerite (1216–1237), Young Layperson of the Diocese of Ypres; Member of the Lay Dominicans (Belgium)
- Clement (d. 1258), Professed Priest of the Dominicans; Bishop of Dunblane (United Kingdom)
- Hugh de Saint-Cher (c. 1200–1263), Professed Priest of the Dominicans; Bishop of Ostia; Cardinal (France–Italy)
- Humbert de Romans (1190–1227), Professed Priest of the Dominicans; 5th Master General (France)
- Yolanda von Vianden (1231–1283), Professed Religious of the Dominican Nuns (Luxembourg)
- Carino Pietro (d. 1293), Professed Religious of the Dominicans (Italy)
- Mechthild of Magdeburg (c. 1207–c. 1294), Layperson of the Diocese of Magdeburg; Member of the Lay Dominicans (Germany)
- Eckhart von Hochheim (c. 1260–c. 1328), Professed Priest of the Dominicans (Germany)
- Matteo Orsini (d. 1340), Professed Priest of the Dominicans; Archbishop of Palermo; Cardinal (Italy)
- Pierre de la Palud (c. 1275–1342), Professed Priest of the Dominicans; Patriarch of Jerusalem of the Latins (France–Israel)
- Simone Saltarelli (1261–1342), Professed Priest of the Dominicans; Archbishop of Pisa (Italy)
- Christina Ebner (1277–1356), Professed Religious of the Dominican Nuns (Germany)
- Elsbeth Stagel (c. 1300–1360), Professed Religious of the Dominican Nuns (Germany)
- Johannes Tauler (c. 1300–1361), Professed Priest of the Dominicans (Germany)
- Adelheid Langmann (c. 1306–1375), Professed Religious of the Dominican Nuns (Germany)
- Alain de la Roche (c. 1428–1475), Professed Priest of the Dominicans (France)
- Ursula Welser (rel. name: Veronika) (d. 1531), Professed Religious of the Dominican Nuns (Germany)
- Antonio de Montesinos (c. 1475–1540), Professed Priest of the Dominicans (Spain–Venezuela)
- Francisco de Vitoria Compludo (c. 1483–1546), Professed Priest of the Dominicans (Spain)
- Antonio de Valdivieso (1495–1550), Professed Priest of the Dominicans; Bishop of Nicaragua; Martyr (Spain–Nicargua)
- Ippolita Gonzaga (rel. name: Livia Osanna) (1503–1570), Professed Religious of the Dominican Nuns (Italy)
- Jerónimo de Loayza González (1498–1575), Professed Priest of the Dominicans; Archbishop of Lima (Spain–Peru)
- Pulisena Margherita Nelli (rel. name: Plautilla) (1524–1588), Professed Religious of the Dominican Nuns (Italy)
- Godfried van Mierlo (1518–1587), Professed Priest of the Dominicans; Bishop of Haarlem (Netherlands)
- Miguel de Benavides (c. 1552–1605), Professed Priest of the Dominicans; Bishop of Manila (Spain–Philippines)
- Michael van Ophoven (1570–1637), Professed Priest of the Dominicans; Bishop of s'Hertogenbosch (Netherlands)
- Fabian Maliszowski (1583–1644), Professed Priest of the Dominicans (Poland)
- Cristóbal de Torres Motones (1573–1654), Professed Priest of the Dominicans; Archbishop of Bogotá (Spain–Peru)
- Marie Lumague (1599–1657), Founder of the Daughters of Providence and the Christian Union of Saint-Chaumond (France)
- Anthony Le Quieu (1601–1676), Professed Priest of the Dominicans; Founder of the Religious of the Blessed Sacrament and of Our Lady (Sacramentine Nuns) (France)
- Maria Antonia Colonna (rel. name: Maria Isabella) (1634–1682), Professed Religious of the Dominican Nuns (Italy)
- Juan de Espinosa Medrano (c. 1630–1688), Professed Priest of the Dominicans (Peru)
- Alonso Enríquez de Guzmán de Orozco (rel. name: Alonso Enríquez of Saint Thomas) (1631–1692), Professed Priest of the Dominicans (Spain)
- Sebastiana de Jesus Salcedo (c. 1652–1692), Professed Religious of the Dominican Sisters of Saint Catherine of Siena (Philippines)
- María Gertrudis Orozco Jaimes Pastrana (rel. name: María Gertrudis Teresa of Saint Agnes) (1668–1730), Professed Religious of the Dominican Nuns (Spain)
- María Lorenzo Fuentes (1665–1741), Professed Religious of the Dominican Nuns (Spain)
- Charles-René Billuart (1685–1757), Professed Priest of the Dominicans (Belgium)
- Catalina de Jesús María Herrera Campusano (rel. name: Catalina Luisa of Jesus, Mary and Joseph) (1717–1795), Professed Religious of the Dominican Tertiary Nuns (Ecuador)
- Maria Carlotta di Bourdon-Parma (rel. name: Giacinta Domenica) (1777–1813), Professed Religious of the Dominican Nuns (Italy)
- Anna Vittoria Dolara (1754–1827), Professed Religious of the Dominican Nuns (Italy)
- Edward Dominic Fenwick (1768–1832), Professed Priest of the Dominicans; Bishop of Cincinnati (United States)
- Theodore Jan van den Broek (1783–1851), Professed Priest of the Dominicans (Netherlands–United States)
- Charles-Éléonore Dufriche-Desgenettes (1778–1860), Priest of the Archdiocese of Paris; Founder of the Archconfraternity of the Most Holy and Immaculate Heart of Mary (France)
- Richard Pius Miles (1791–1860), Professed Priest of the Dominicans; Bishop of Nashville (United States)
- Jean-Baptiste Besson (rel. name: Hyacinthe) (1816–1861), Professed Priest of the Dominicans (France)
- Jean-Baptiste Henri Lacordaire (1802–1861), Professed Priest of the Dominicans; Founder of the Society of Saint John (France)
- Domingo Canubio Alberto (1804–1864), Professed Priest of the Dominicans; Bishop of Segorbe (Spain)
- Alexandre Vincent Jandel (1810–1872), Professed Priest of the Dominicans; Master General (France–Italy)
- Rosa Orzi (1706–1783), Founder of the Sisters of Saint Aloysius Gonzaga of Parma (now part of Dominican Sisters of Blessed Imelda) (Italy)
- Mary Augustine Niehierl (d. 1877), Founder of the Dominican Sisters of the Most Holy Rosary of Newburgh (now part of Dominican Sisters of Hope) (Germany–United States)
- James Whelan (1823–1878), Professed Priest of the Dominicans; Bishop of Nashville; Founder of the Dominican Sisters of Saint Cecilia (Ireland–United States)
- Alice Mary Thorpe (Catherine Mary Antoninus) (1844–1879), Founder of the Dominican Sisters of Our Lady of the Rosary (now the Dominican Sisters of Sparkill) (United Kingdom–United States)
- Victor Chocarne (1824–1881), Priest of the Diocese of Dijon; Founder of the Little Dominican Sisters, Nurses of the Poor (France)
- Aquinata Lauter (1815–1883), Professed Religious of the Dominican Nuns (Germany)
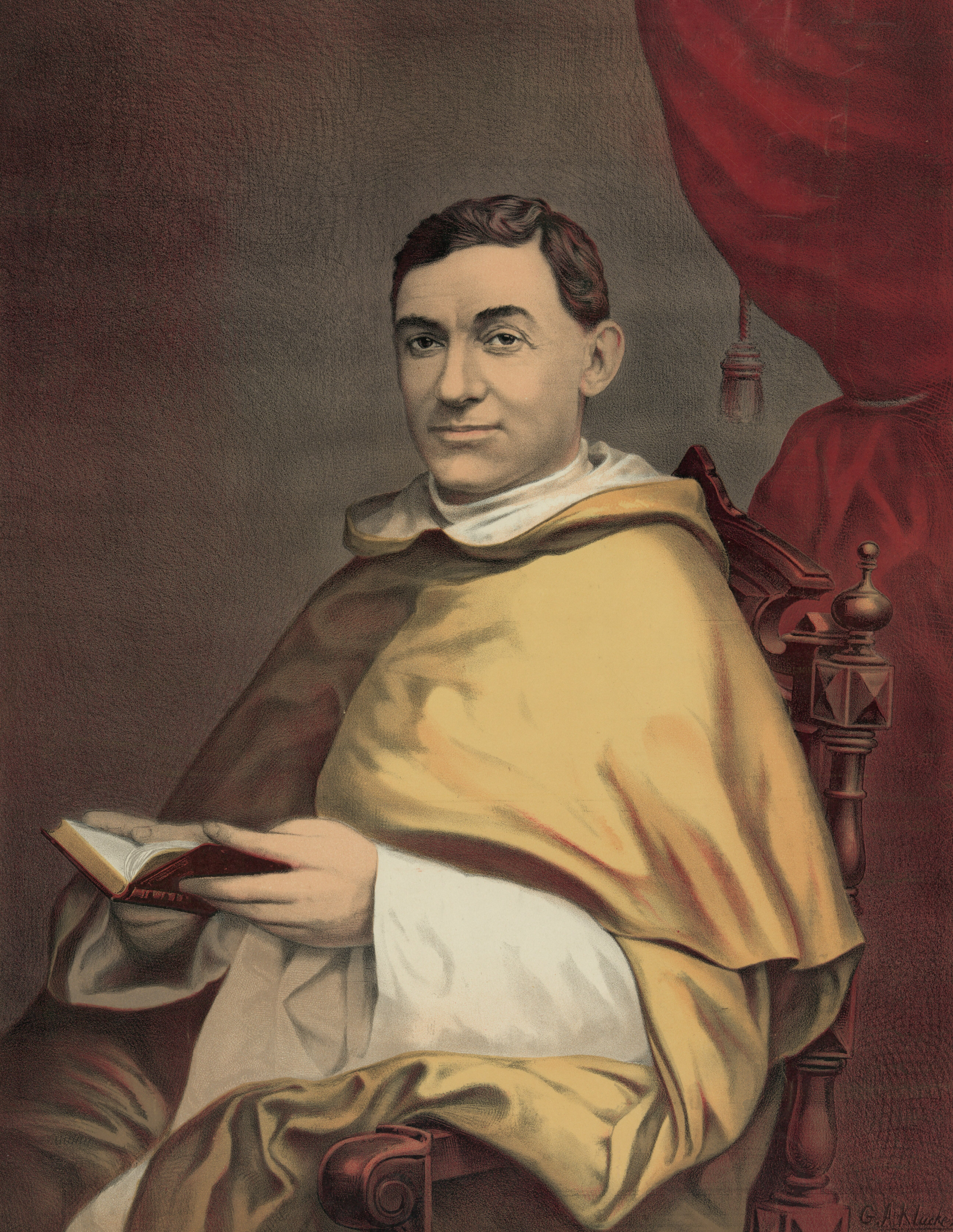
Thomas Nicholas Burke

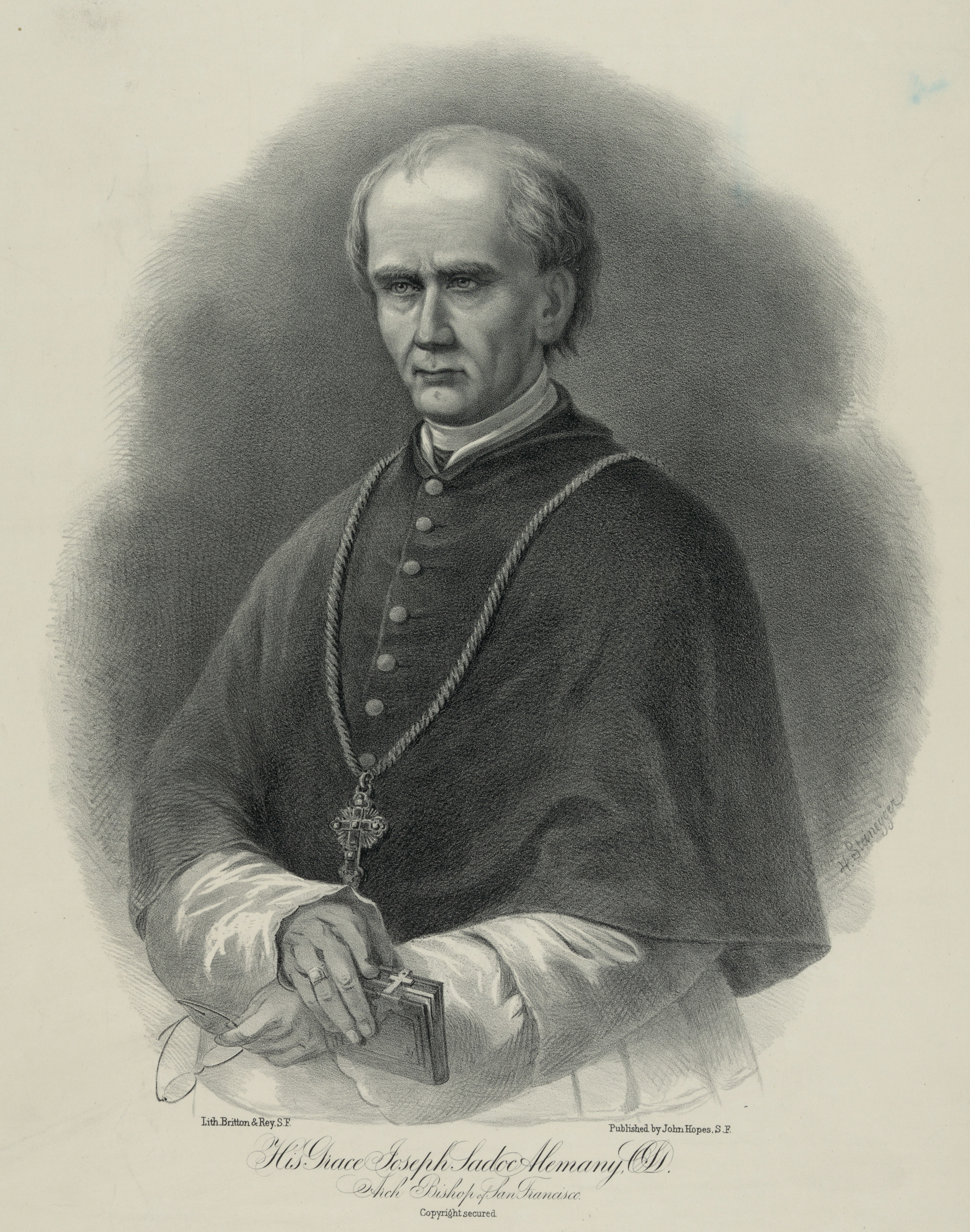
Bp. José Sadoc Alemany

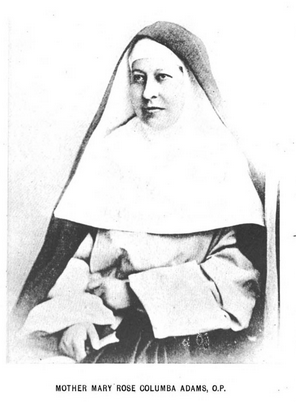
Mary Rose Columba Adams

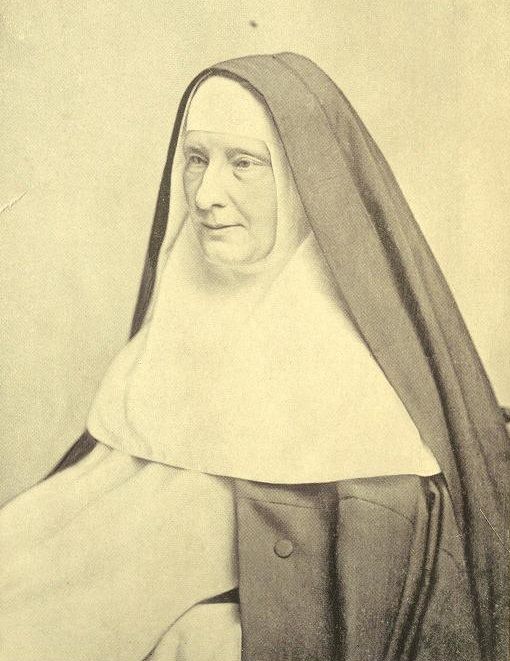
Frances Raphael Drane

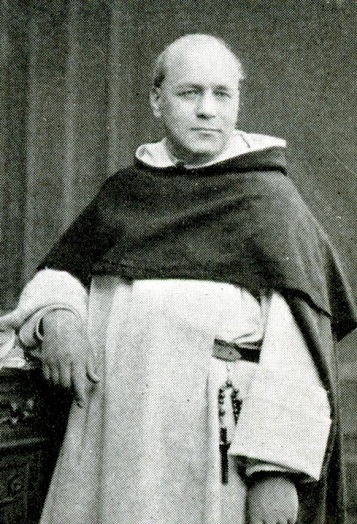
Bernard Chocarne

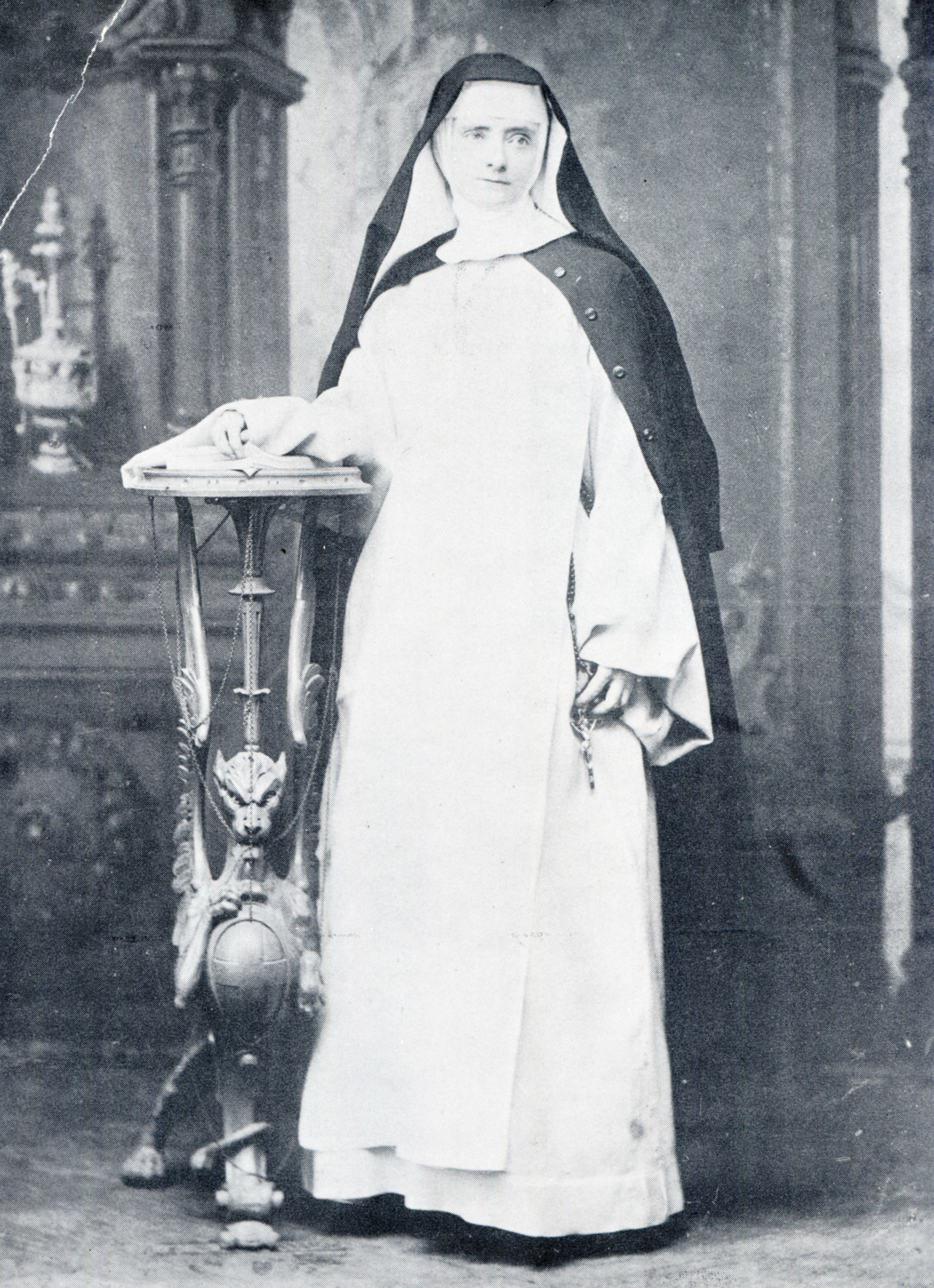
Mary Cathedrine Smith

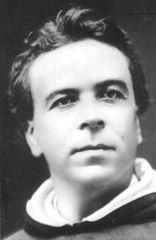
Henri Didon

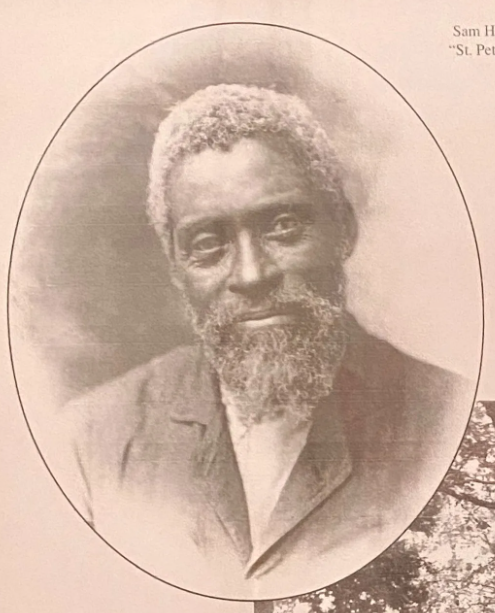
Samuel Henderson

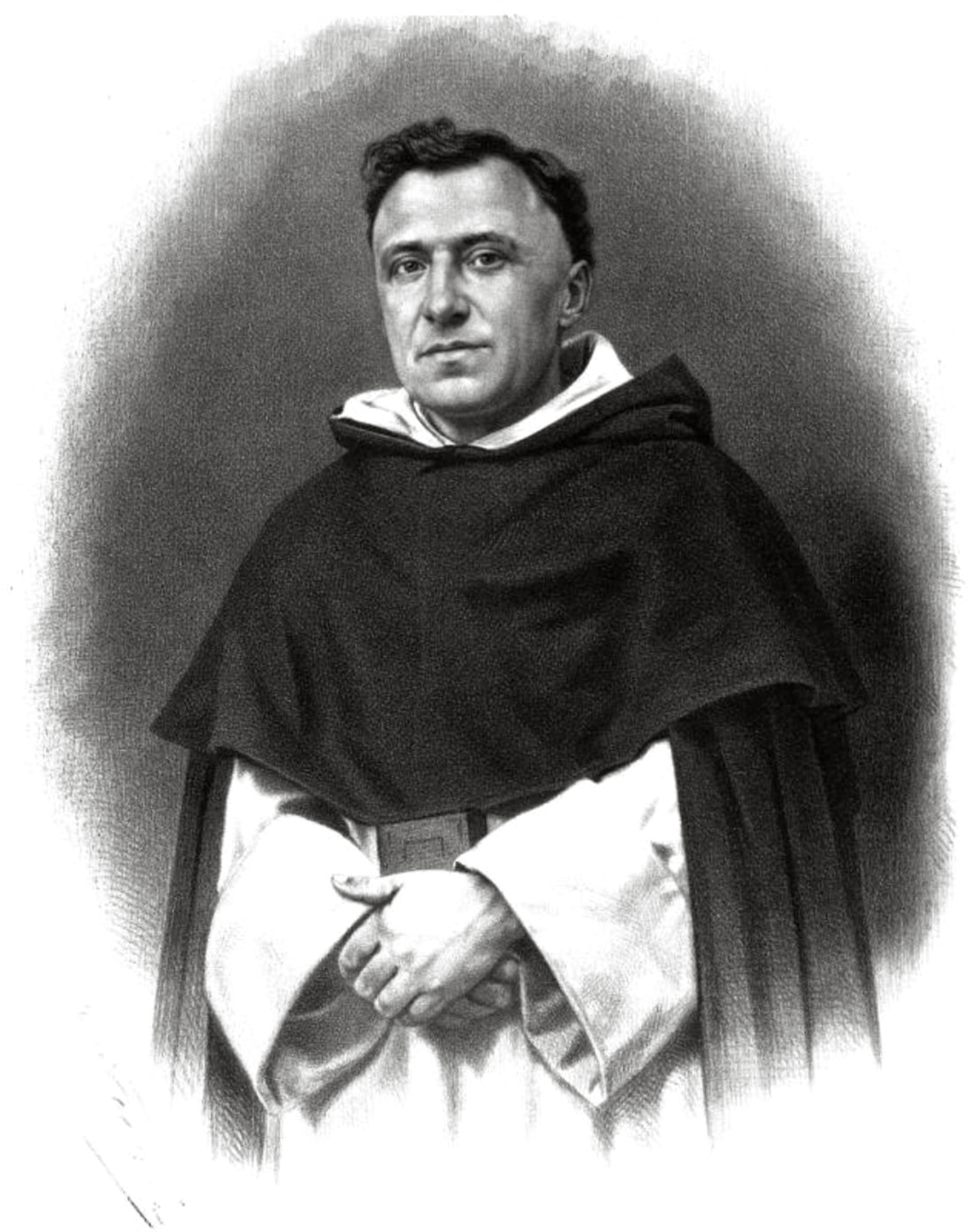
Jacques Monsabré

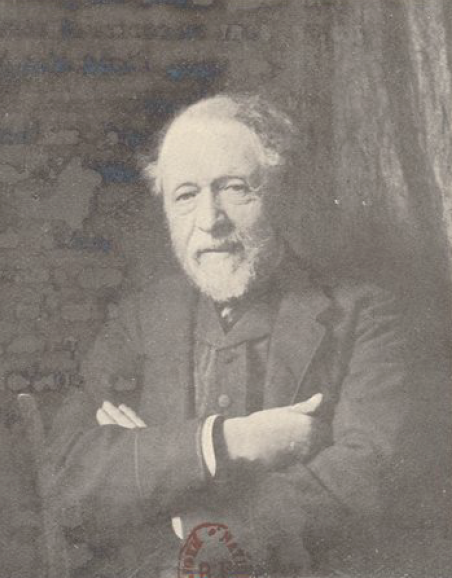
Félix Villé

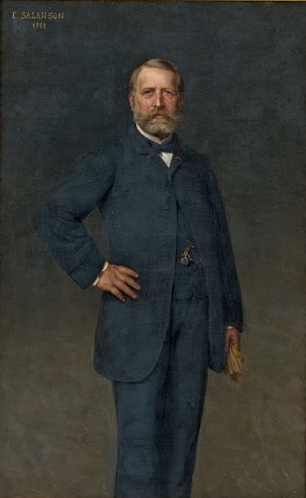
Maurice de Blic

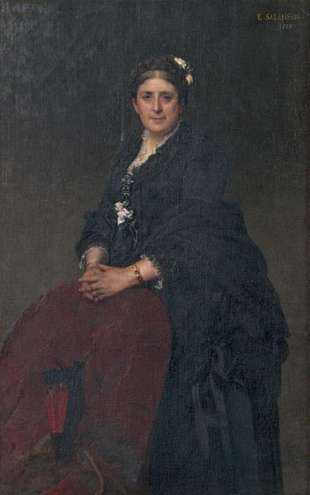
Marguerite Sophie de Blic

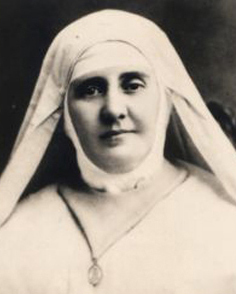
Marie Sabès

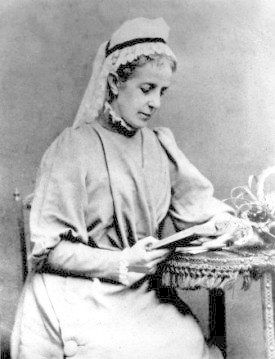
Agnes McLaren

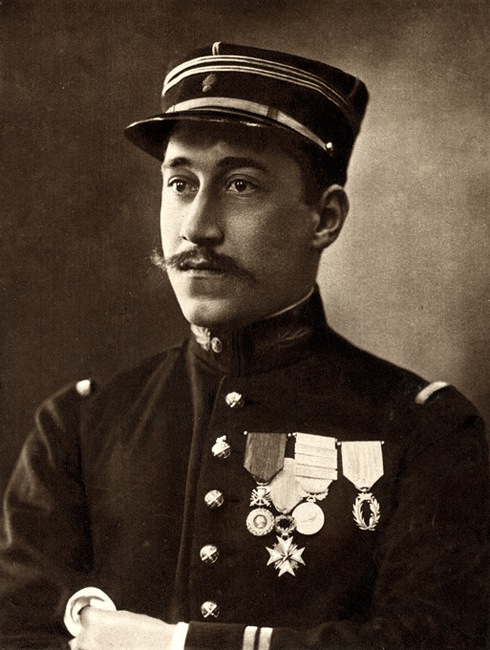
Ernest Psichari

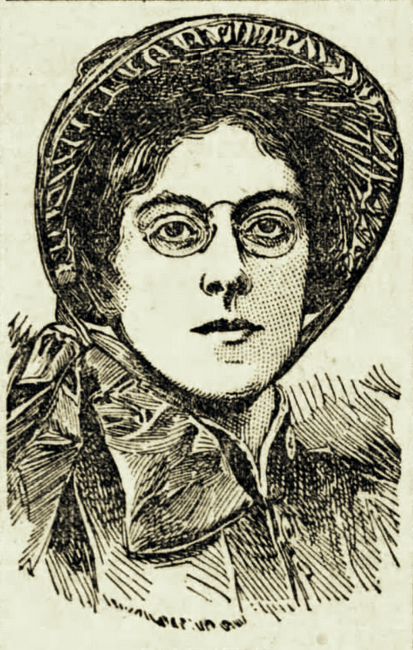
Susie Forrest Swift

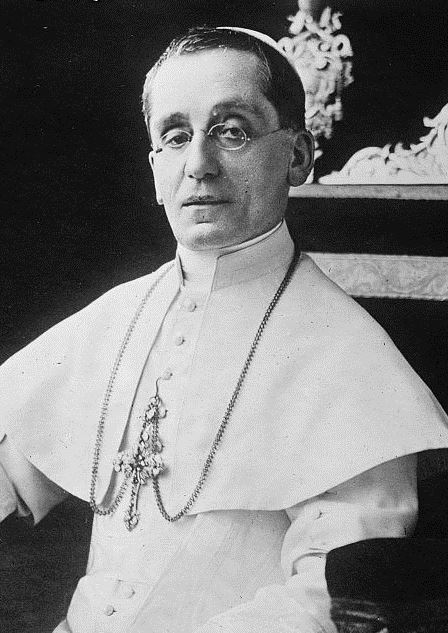
Pope Benedict XV

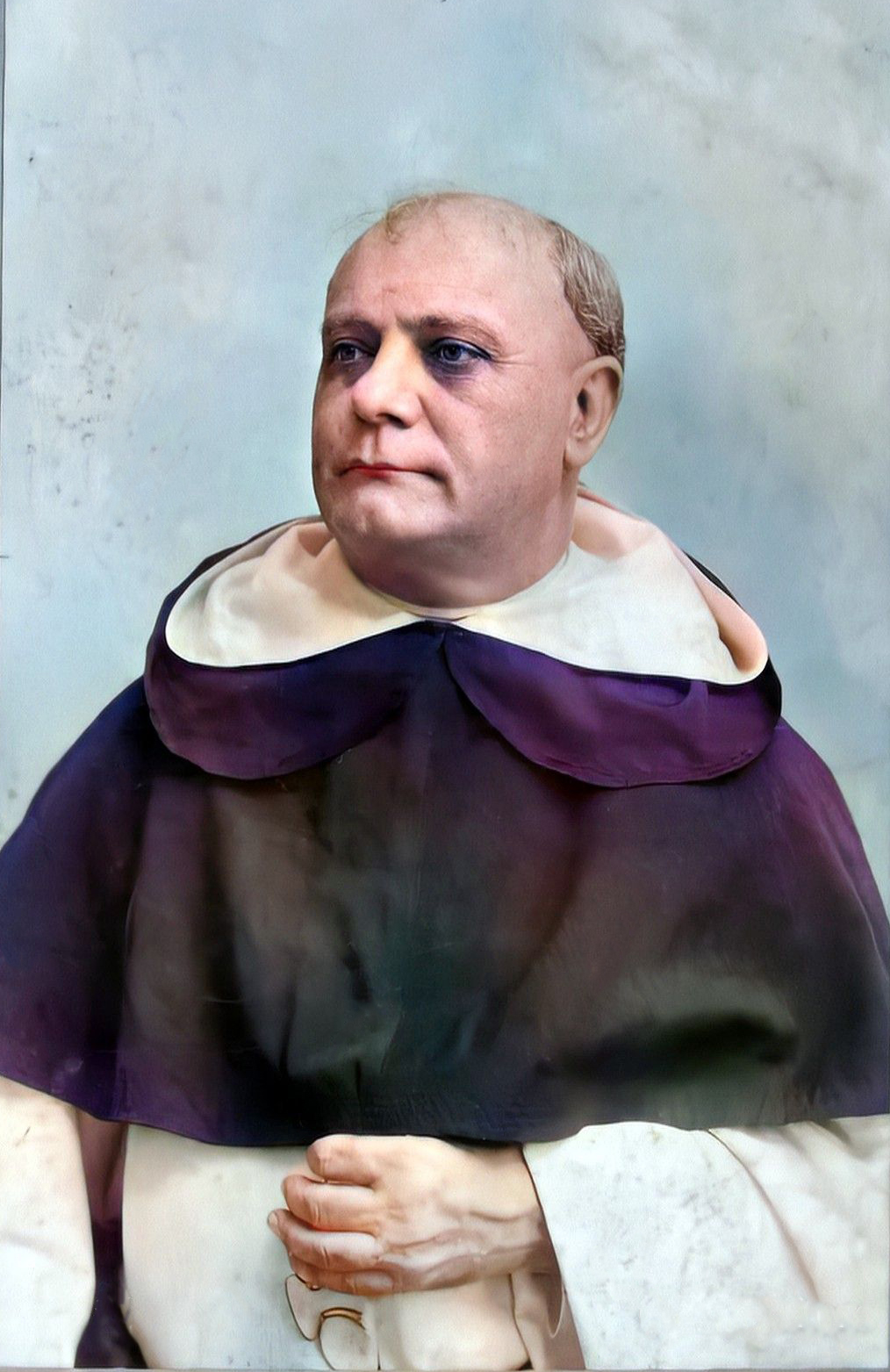
Angel María Boisdron

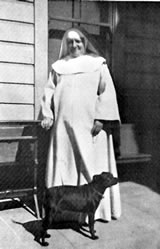
Maria Pia Backes

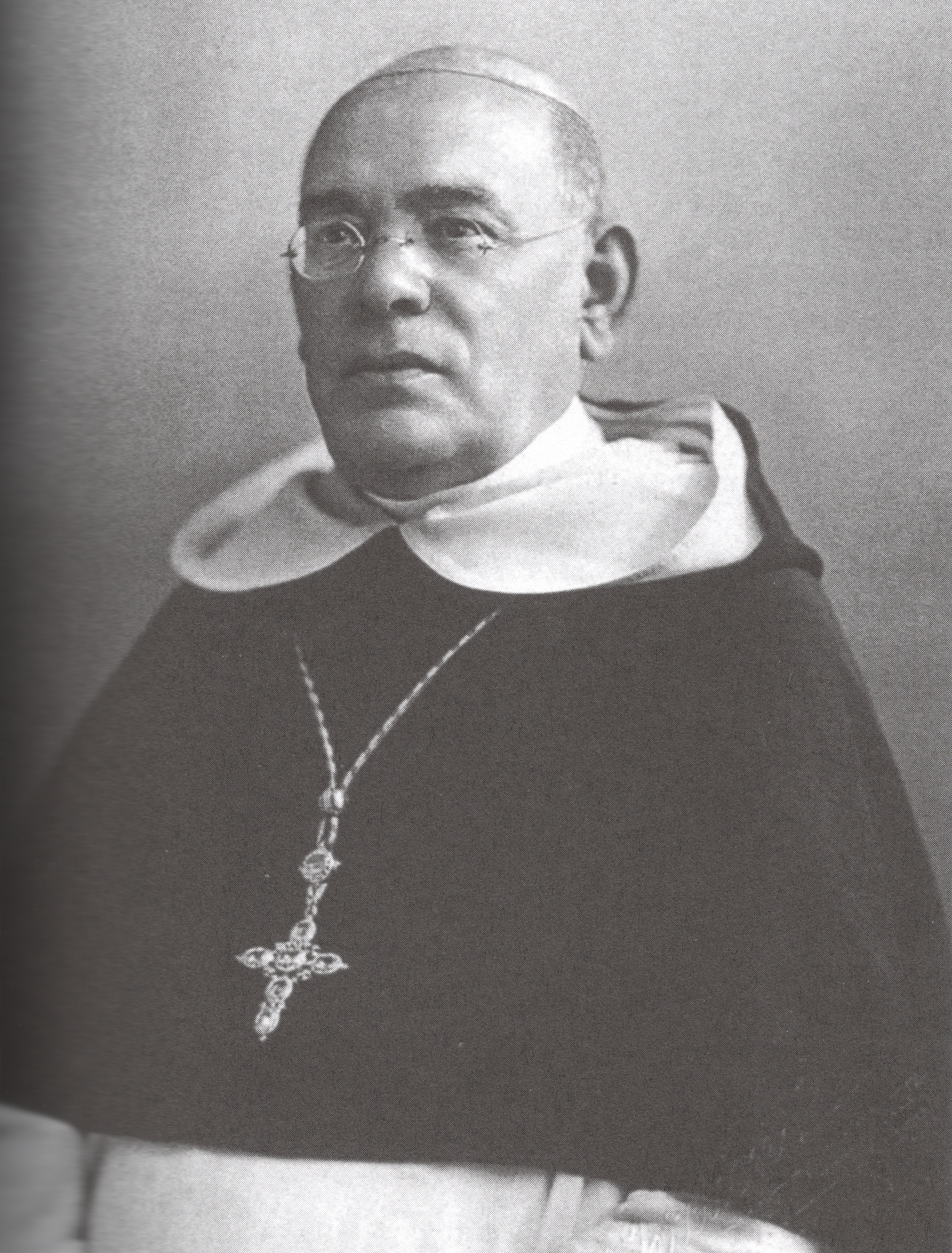
Bp. Angelo Portelli

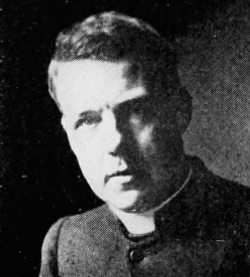
Bede Jarrett

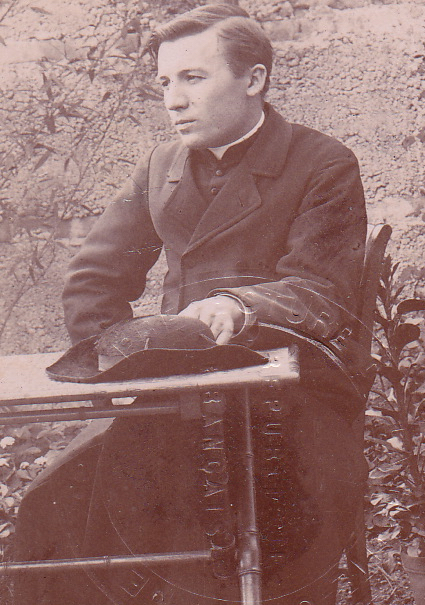
Marie-Vincent Bernadot

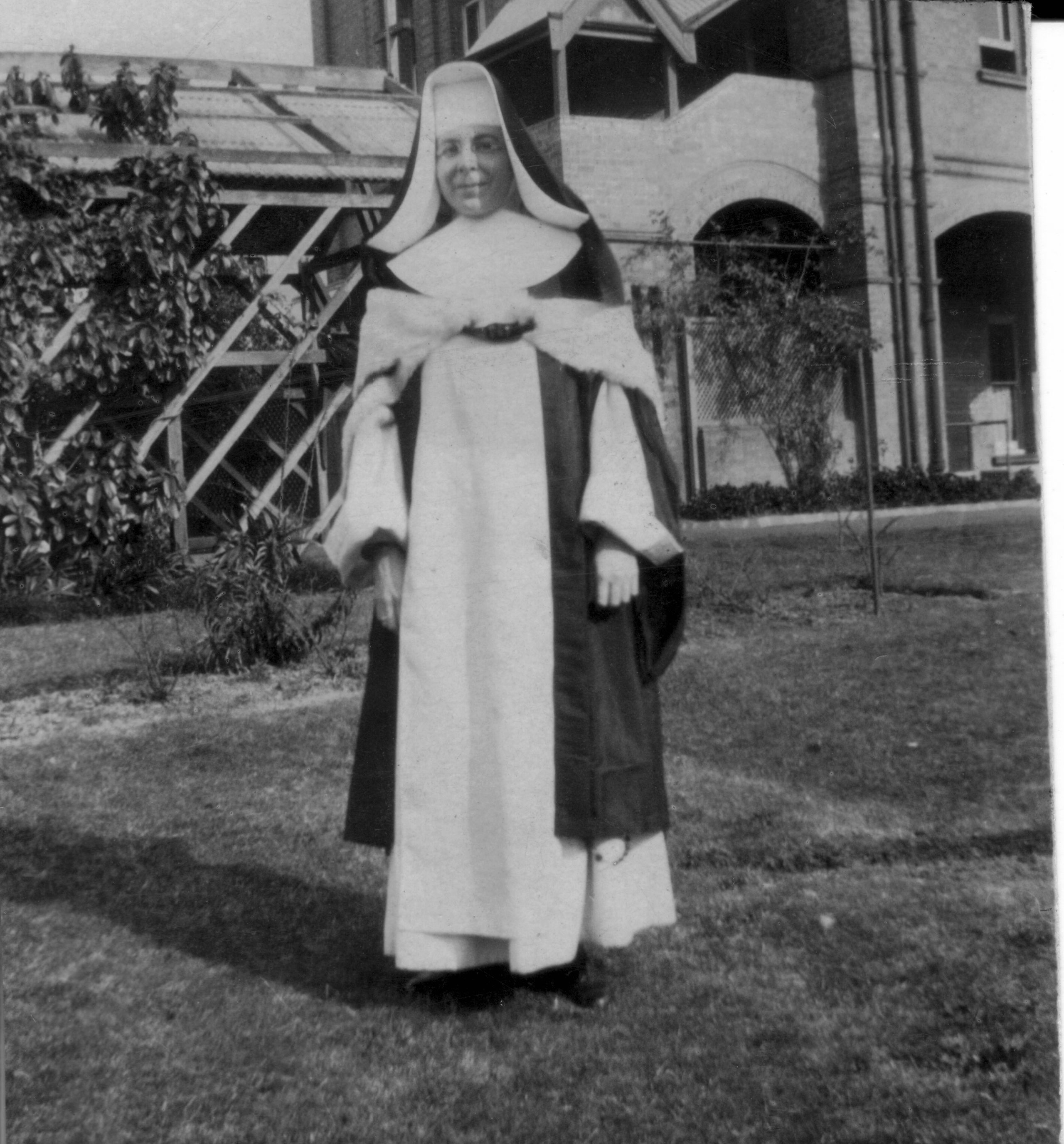
Mary Anselm O'Brien

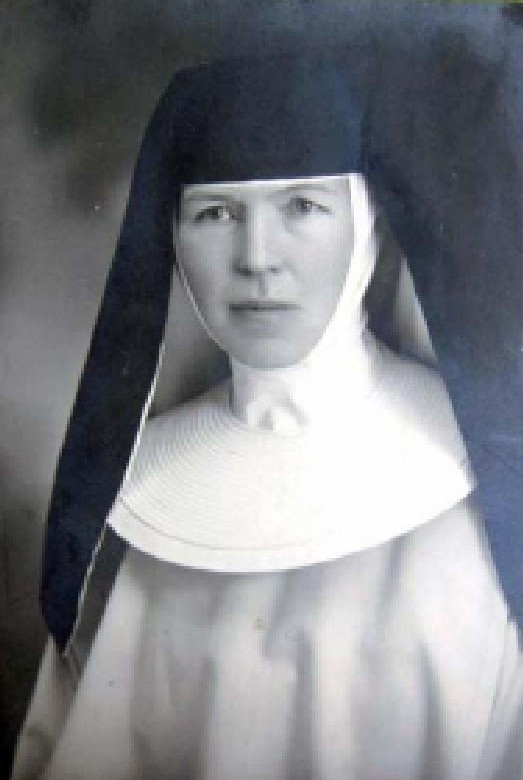
Marie Filomena Dolanská

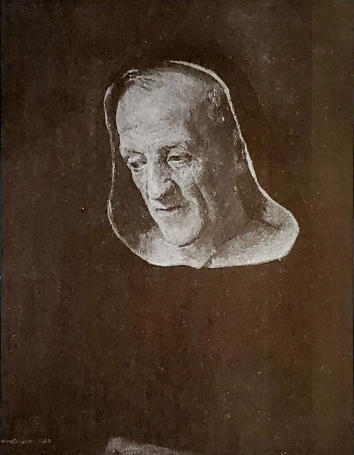
Vincent McNabb

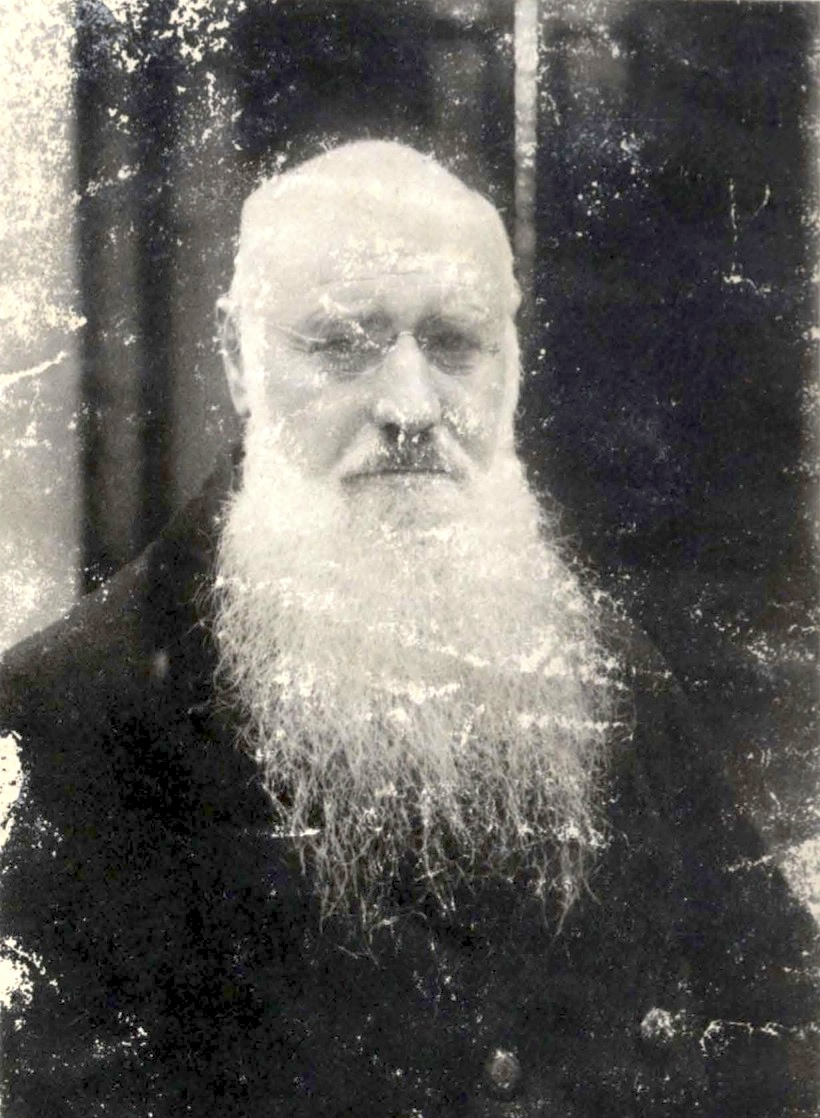
Bp. Thomas de la Hoz

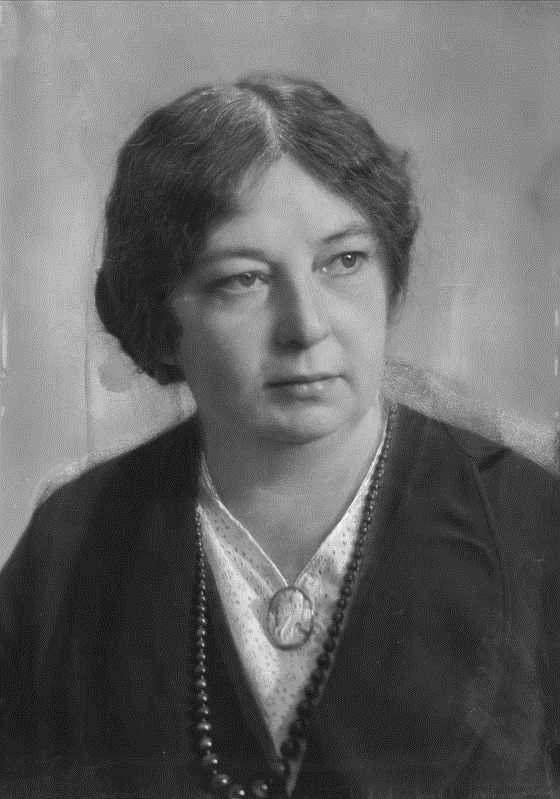
Sigrid Undset

Félix Leseur

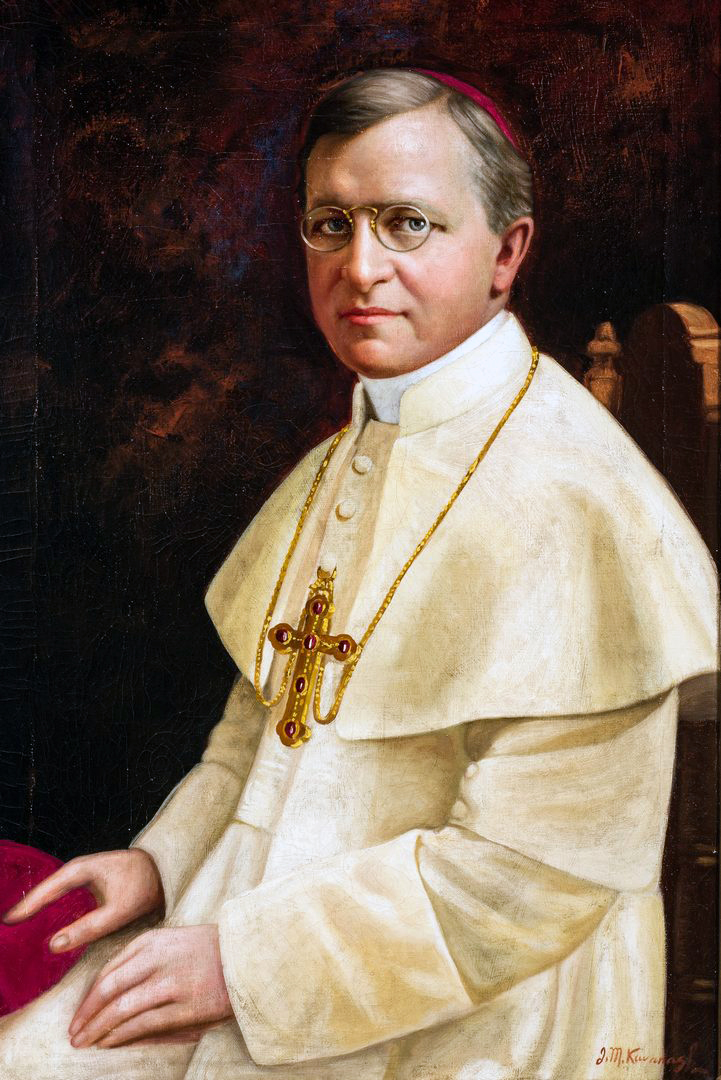
Abp. John Timothy McNicholas

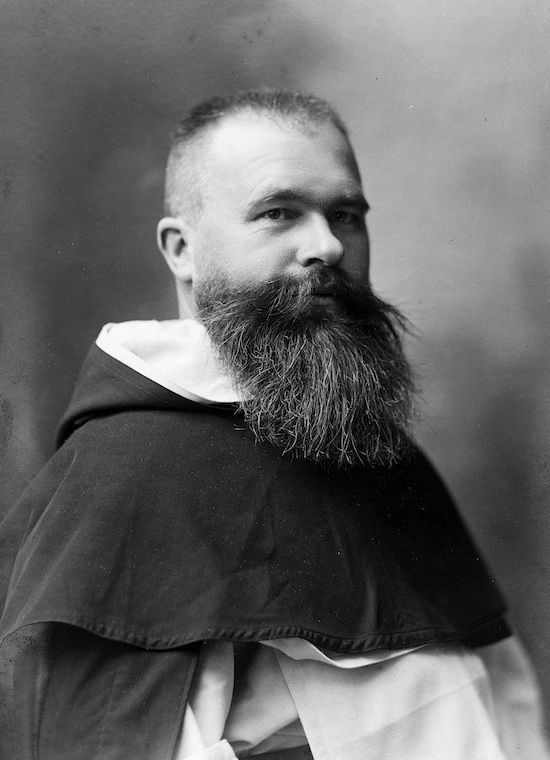
Antonin Jaussen

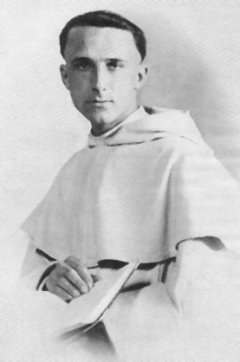
Réginald Garrigou-Lagrange

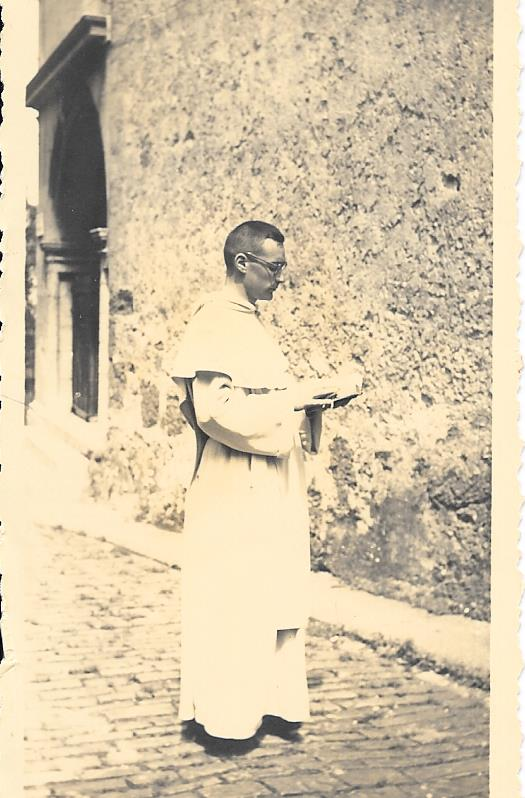
Joseba Aldamiz-Etxebarria

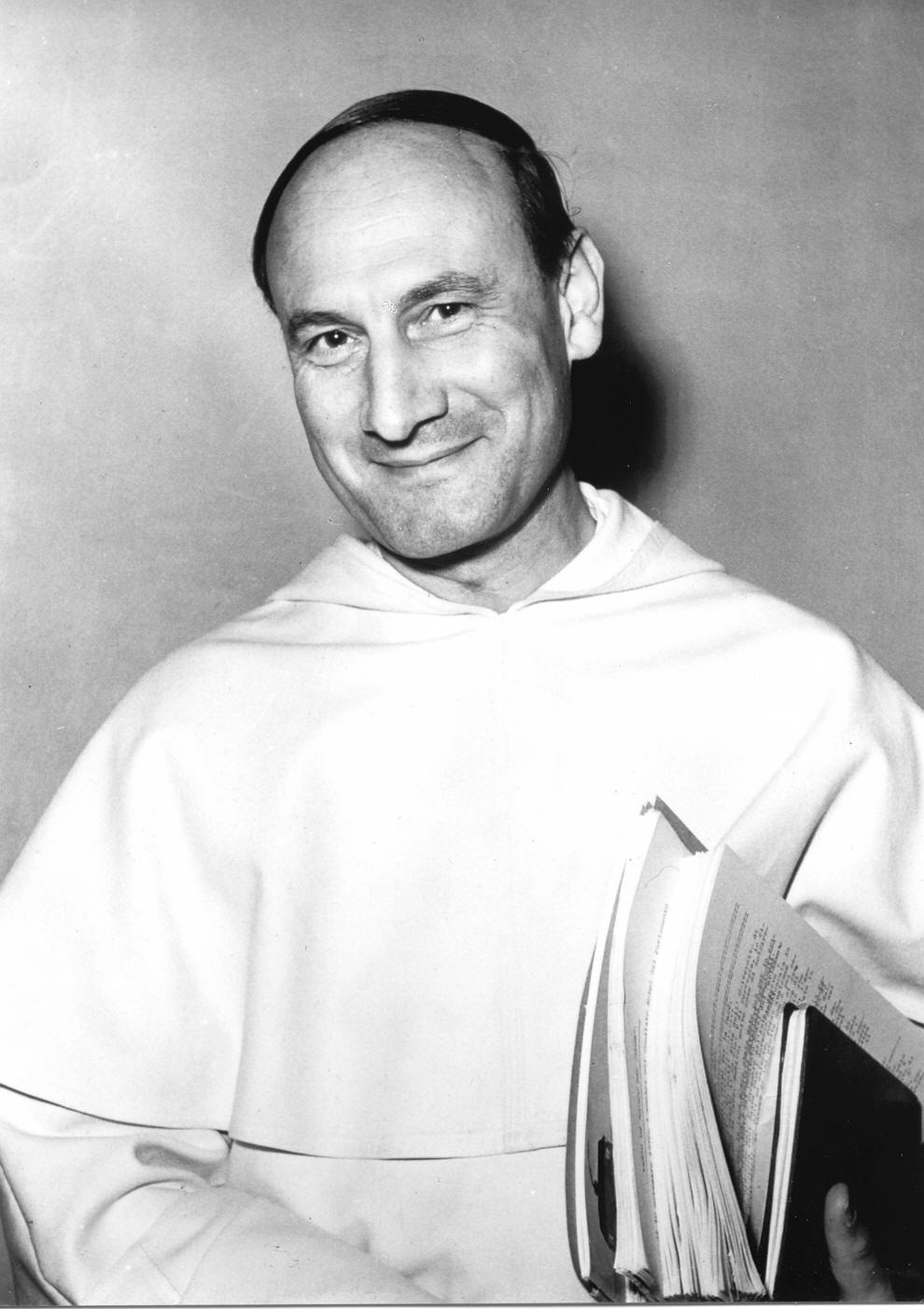
Dominique Pire

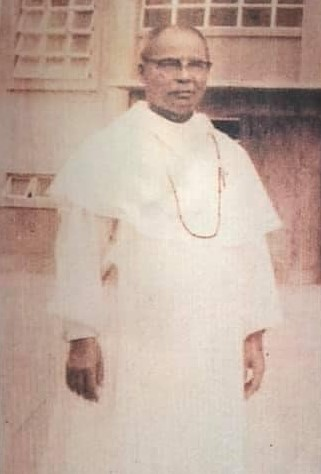
Gregorio Hontomin

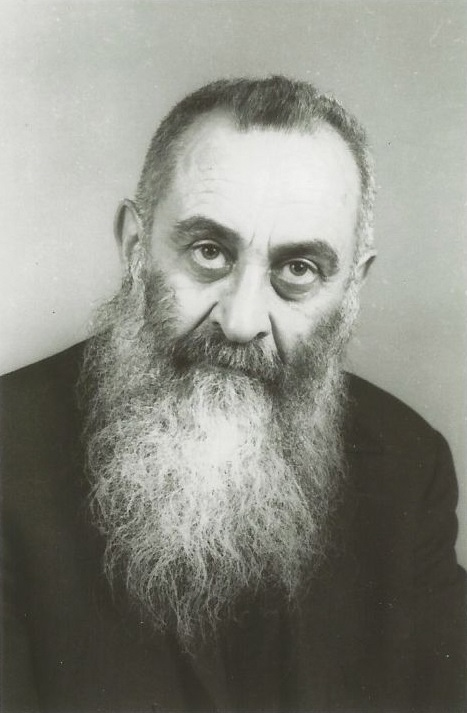
Georges Habra

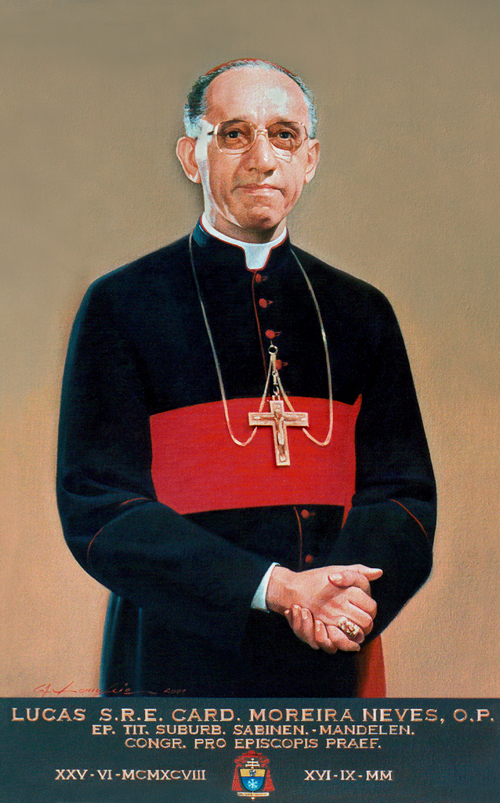
Lucas Moreira Neves

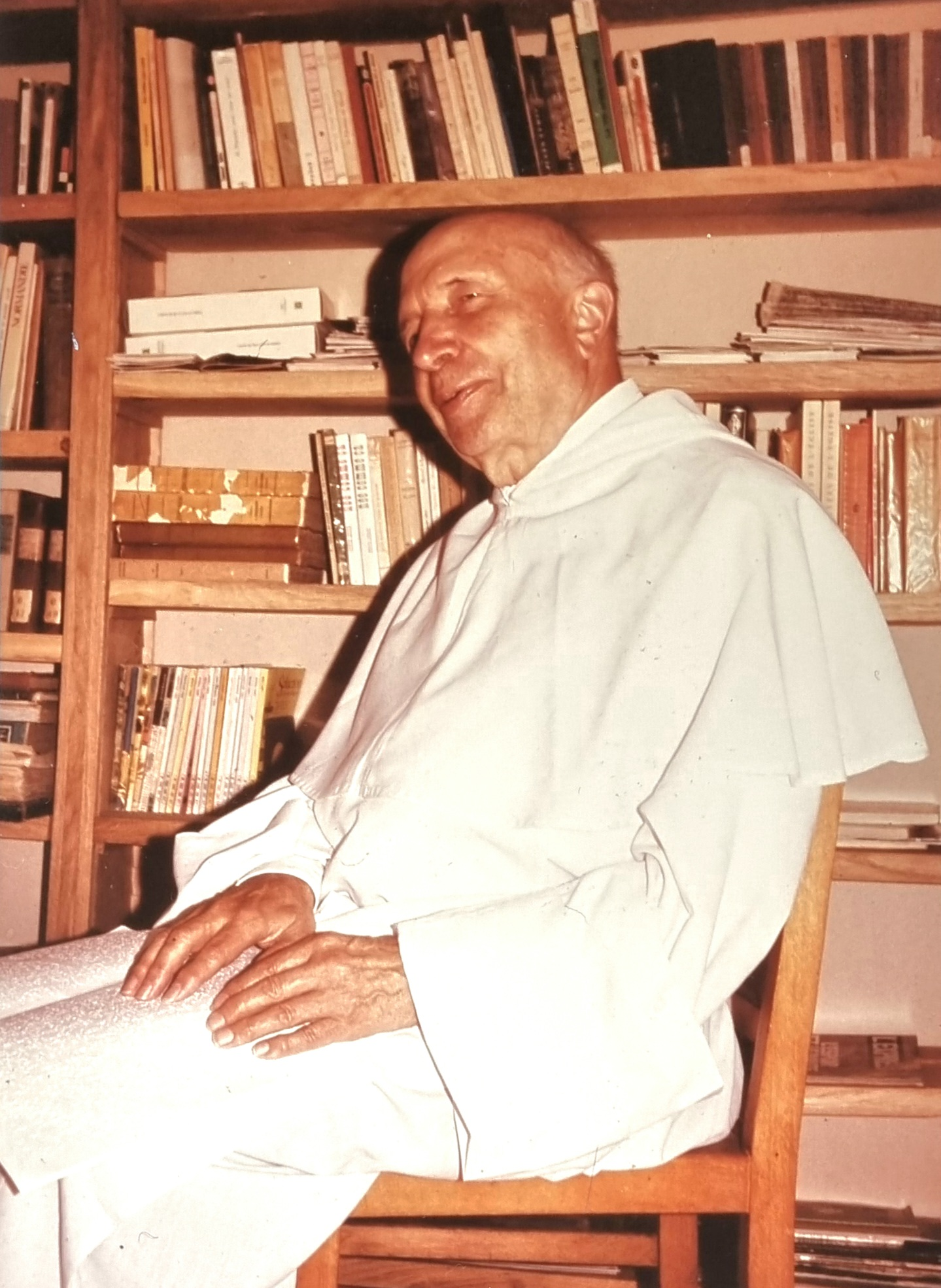
Joseph-Marie Perrin

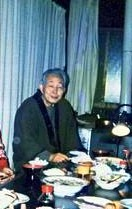
Shigeto Oshida

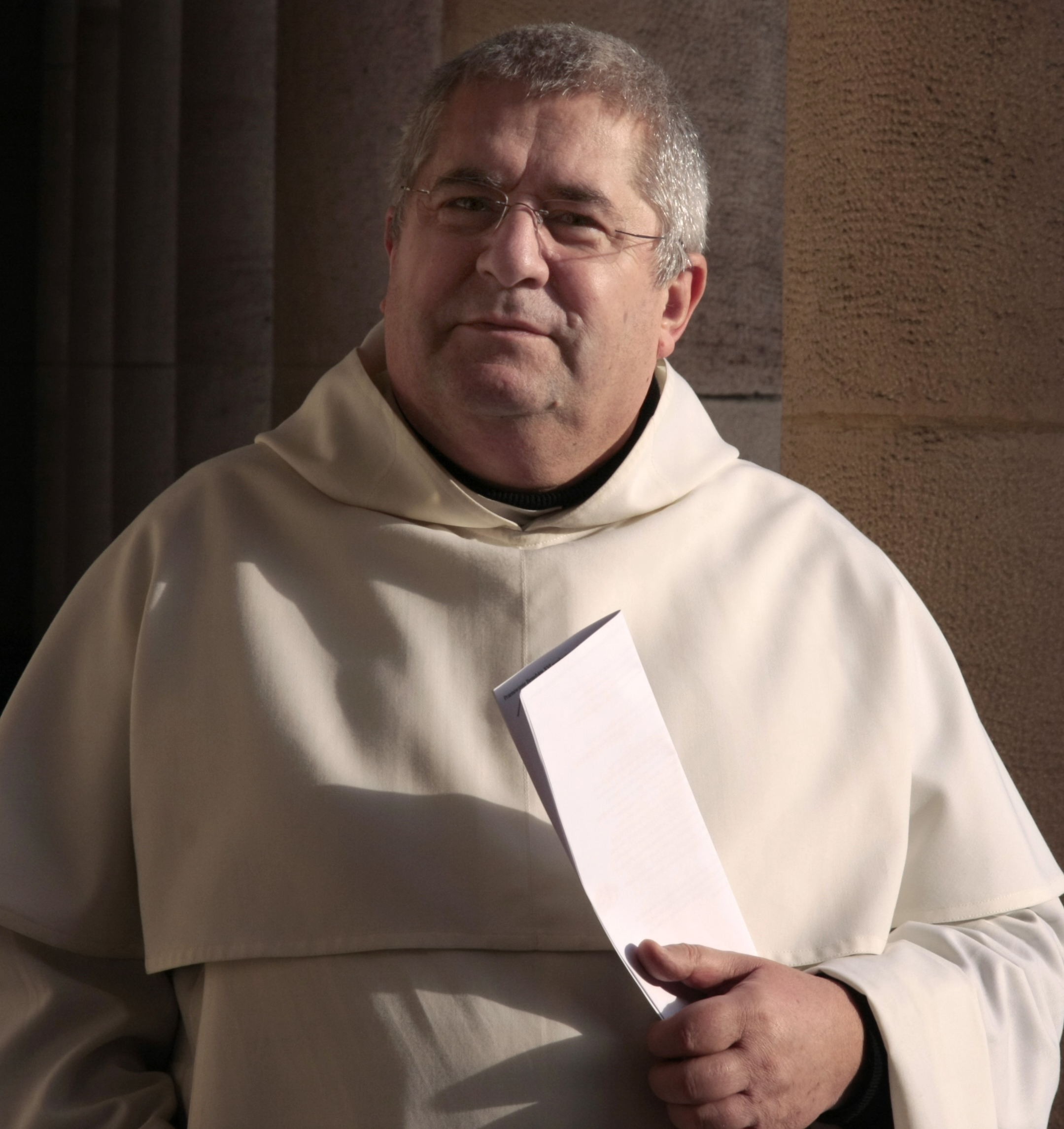
Jan Wojciech Góra

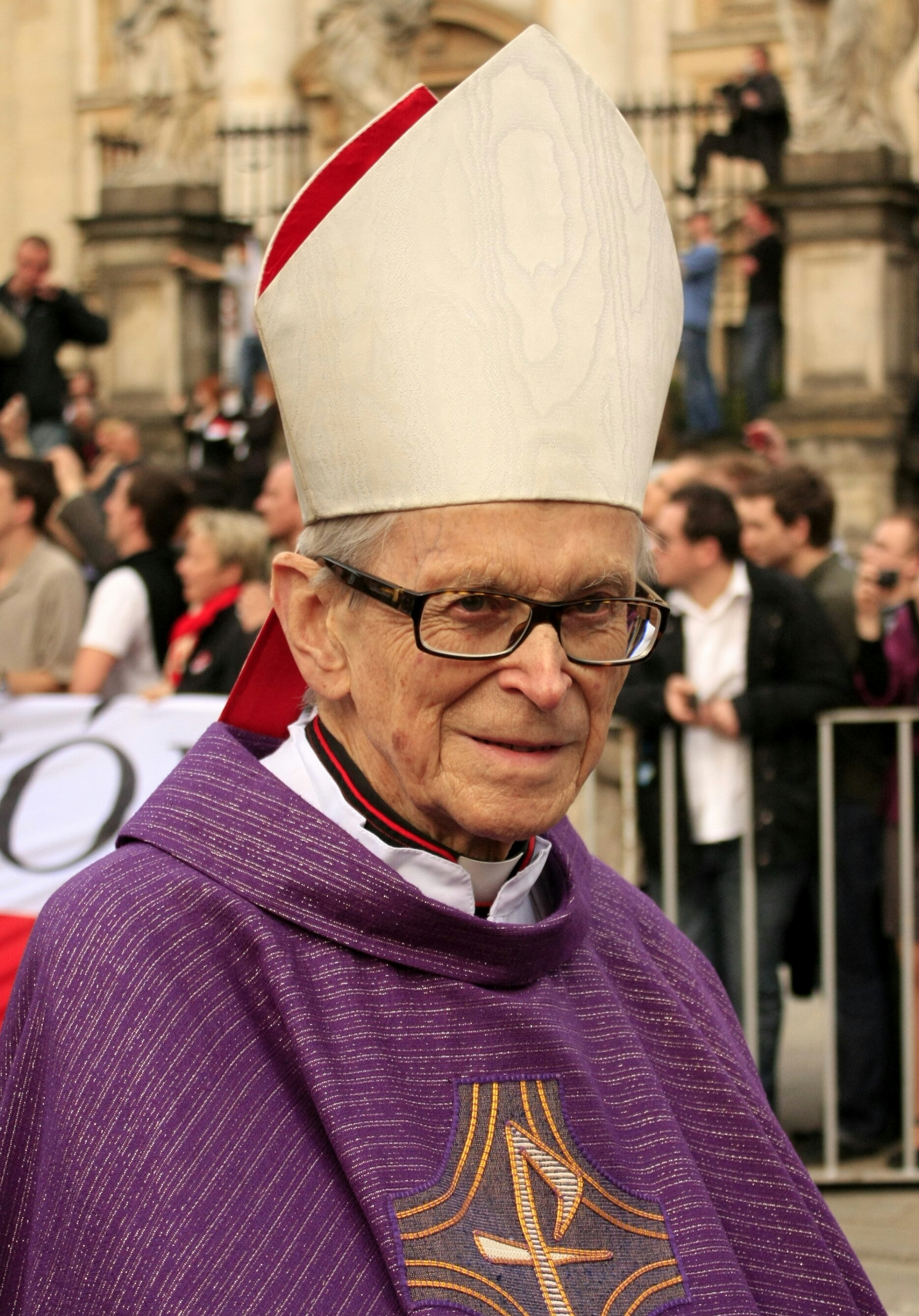
Franciszek Macharski

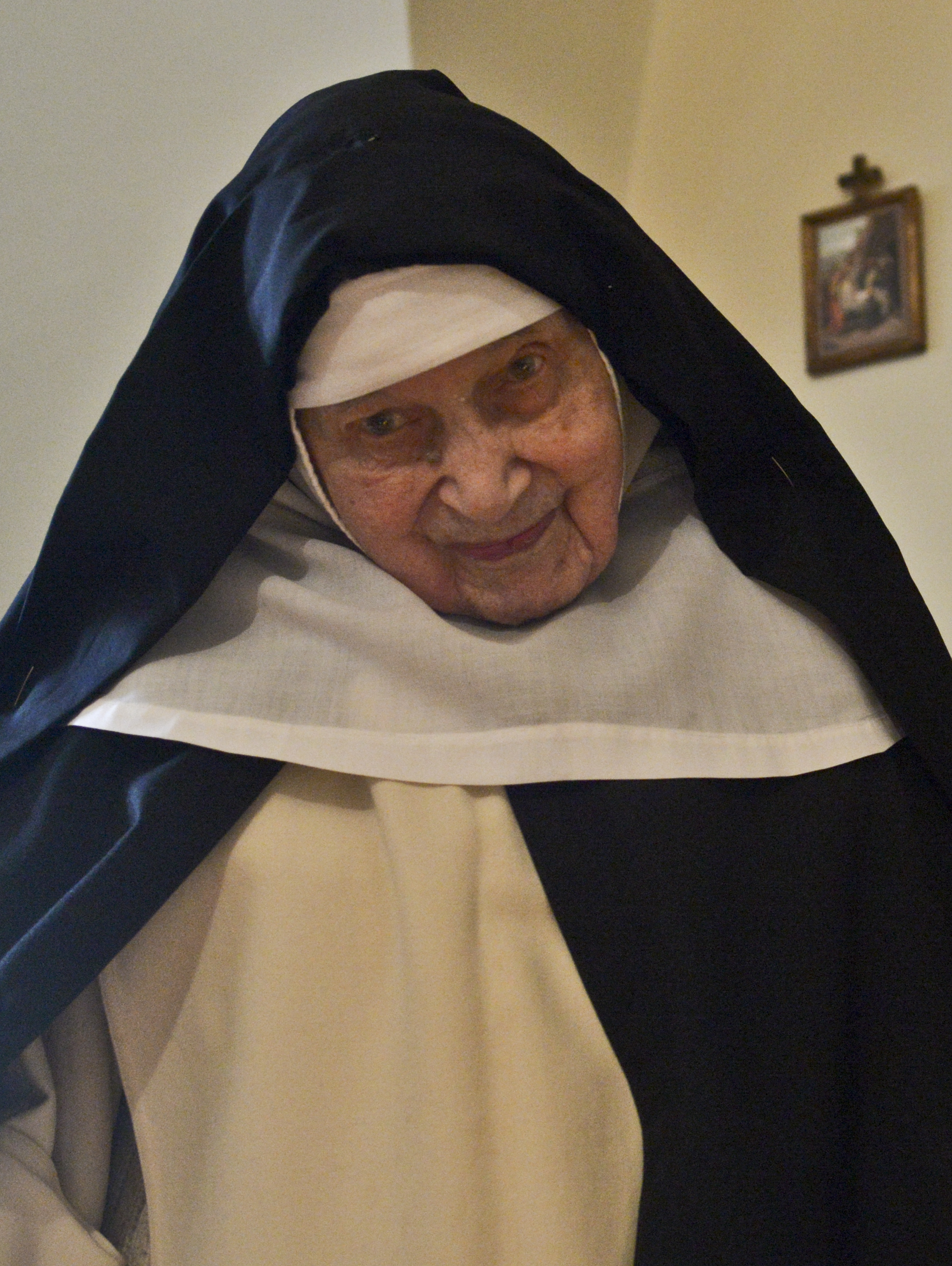
Cecylia Roszak
- Thomas Nicholas Burke (1830–1883), Professed Priest of the Dominicans (Ireland)
- Gèrine Fabre (1811–1887), Founder of the Dominican Sisters of the French Congregation of Saint Catherine of Siena (France)
- Josep Sadoc Alemany Conill (1814–1888), Professed Priest of the Dominicans; Archbishop of San Francisco (Spain–United States)
- Francesc Sadoc Vilarrasa Costa (1814–1888), Professed Priest of the Dominicans (Spain–United States)
- Sophia Charlotte Adams (rel. name: Mary Rose Columba) (1832–1891), Professed Religious of the Dominican Sisters of Stone (United Kingdom–Australia)
- Catherine Goemaere (rel. name: Mary of the Cross) (1809–1891), Founder of the Dominican Sisters of the Most Holy Name of Jesus (Belgium–United States)
- Augusta Theodosia Drane (rel. name: Frances Raphael) (1823–1894), Professed Religious of the Dominican Nuns (United Kingdom)
- Pierre-Alphonse Chocarne (rel. name: Bernard) (1826–1895), Professed Priest of the Dominicans (France)
- Victoire-Thérèse Chupin (1813–1896), Founder of the Dominican Sisters of Our Lady of Grace of Chatillon (France)
- Theresa Scheininger (rel. name: Hyacinth) (1835–1896), Professed Religious of the Dominican Sisters of Grand Rapids (Germany–United States)
- Lucy Eaton Smith (rel. name: Mary Catherine De Ricci of the Sacred Heart) (1845–1894), Founder of the Dominican Sisters of St. Catherine de' Ricci (United States)
- Henri Didon (rel. name: Martin) (1840–1900), Professed Priest of the Dominicans (France)
- Teresa Tiefenböck (rel. name: Mary Mauritia) (1835–1900), Founder of the Dominican Sisters of Saint Catherine of Siena of King William's Town (South Africa)
- Ceslaus von Robiano (1829–1902), Professed Priest of the Dominicans (Belgium–Germany)
- Maurice de Blic (1828–1904) and Marguerite Sophie de Blic née de Gravier (1833–1921), Married Laypersons of the Archdiocese of Dijon; Cofounders of the Little Dominican Sisters, Nurses of the Poor (France)
- Heinrich Seuse Denifle (1844–1905), Professed Priest of the Dominicans (Austria–Germany)
- Samuel Henderson (c. 1822–1907), Married Layperson of the Diocese of Memphis (United States)
- Jacques-Marie-Louis Monsabré (1827–1907), Professed Priest of the Dominicans (France)
- Félix Villé (1819–1907), Layperson of the Archdiocese of Paris; Member of the Lay Dominicans and Society of Saint John (France)
- Vicenta Bautista (1860–1908), Layperson of the Archdiocese of Lipa; Member of the Lay Dominicans (Philippines)
- Rose Wehrlé (rel. name: Rose of Saint Mary) (1846–1909), Founder of the Dominican Nuns of Perpetual Rosary (France)
- Marie Anne Jacques Laure Sabès (rel. name: Marie de la Providence) (1841–1911), Founder of the Dominican Missionaries of Our Lady of Deliverance (Martinique–France)
- Pia Elena Bruzzi Bonaguidi (1835–1913), Widow; Cofounder of the Dominican Sisters of the Holy Spirit (Italy)
- Agnes McLaren (1837–1913), Layperson of the Archdiocese of St. Andrews and Edinburgh; Member of the Lay Dominicans (United Kingdom–France)
- Ernest Psichari (1883–1914), Layperson of the Diocese of Versailles; Member of the Lay Dominicans (France–Belgium)
- Appolonia Fiegler (rel. name: Aquitana) (1848–1915), Founder of the Dominican Sisters of Grand Rapids (Germany–United States)
- Catharine Muth (d. 1916), Founder of the Dominican Sisters of the Sacred Heart of Caldwell (United States)
- Susie Forrest Swift (rel. name: Imelda Teresa) (1862–1916), Professed Religious of the Dominican Nuns (United States)
- Philomène Labrecque (rel. name: Marie de la Charité) (1852–1920), Founder of the Dominican Sisters of the Trinity (France)
- Pierre-Auguste Marie Saintourens (rel. name: Damien-Marie) (1835–1920), Professed Priest of the Dominicans; Founder of the Dominican Nuns of Perpetual Rosary (France)
- Pope Benedict XV [Giacomo Paolo della Chiesa] (1854–1922), Pope; Member of the Priestly Fraternity of Saint Dominic (Italy)
- Mary Walsh (1850–1922), Founder of the Dominican Sisters of the Sick Poor (now part of Dominican Sisters of Hope) (Ireland–United States)
- Ángel María Boisdron (1845–1924), Professed Priest of the Dominicans; Founder of the Dominican Sisters of the Holy Name of Jesus (Argentina)
- Mary Madden (rel. name: Camilla) (1854–1924), Founder of the Adrian Dominican Sisters (Ireland–United States)
- Maria Pia Backes (1852–1925), Founder of the Dominican Sisters of the Queen of the Most Holy Rosary (United States)
- Albert Maria Weiss (1844–1925), Professed Priest of the Dominicans (Germany)
- Manuel García Marina (1892–1926), Professed Religious of the Dominicans; Martyr in odium fidei (Spain–Peru)
- Francesca Tereża Parlar (1842–1927), Layperson of the Archdiocese of Malta; Member of the Lay Dominicans (Malta)
- Francesco Saverio Portelli (rel. name: Angelo) (1852–1927), Professed Priest of the Dominicans; Auxiliary Bishop of Malta (Malta)
- Raymond Dominique Carrerot (rel. name: Domingos) (1863–1933), Professed Priest of the Dominicans; Bishop of Porto Nacional (France–Brazil)
- Cyril Jarrett (rel. name: Bede) (1881–1934), Professed Priest of the Dominicans (United Kingdom)
- Urbano Martín (1907–1934), Professed Priest of the Dominicans; Martyr in odium fidei (Spain–China)
- Ignacio Arroyo (1851–1935) and Maria Pidal Arroyo (1864–1920), Married Laypersons of the Archdiocese of Jaro (Philippines)
- Felix Pierre Mandonnet (1858–1936), Professed Priest of the Dominicans (Belgium)
- Pierre Bernadot (rel. name: Marie-Vincent) (1883–1941), Professed Priest of the Dominicans (France)
- Joseph-Marie Guihaire (rel. name: Marc) (1891–1942), Professed Priest of the Dominicans; Martyr in odium fidei (France–Germany)
- František Kužela (rel. name: Patrik Maria) (1915–1942), Professed Deacon of the Dominicans; Martyr in odium fidei (Czech Republic–Poland)
- Lisamaria Meirowsky (1904–1942), Layperson of the Archdiocese of Köln; Member of the Lay Dominicans (Germany–Poland)
- Filomena Dolanská (rel. name: Marie) (1895–1943), Professed Religious of the Dominican Sisters of Bohemia; Martyr in odium fidei (Czech Republic–Germany)
- Denys Chenault (rel. name: Rémi) (1899–1943), Professed Priest of the Dominicans; Martyr in odium fidei (France–Poland)
- Vincent McNabb (1868–1943), Professed Priest of the Dominicans (Ireland–United Kingdom)
- Tonka Kezić (rel. name: Veronika) (1911–1944), Professed Religious of the Dominican Sisters of the Holy Guardian Angels; Martyr in odium fidei (Croatia)
- Henriëtte Mendes da Costa (rel. name: Judith) (1895–1944), Professed Religious of the Dominican Sisters of Saint Catherine of Siena of Voorschoten; Martyr in odium fidei (Netherlands–Poland)
- Rosario Mirabene (1912–1944), Professed Priest of the Dominicans; Martyr in odium fidei (Italy)
- František Hronek (rel. name: Benedikt) (1907–1945), Professed Priest of the Dominicans; Martyr in odium fidei (Czech Republic)
- Antoinette Kunkel (rel. name: Hyacinth) (1898–1945), Professed Religious of the Maryknoll Sisters of Saint Dominic; Martyr in odium fidei (United States–Philippines)
- Catherine Cecily O'Brien (rel. name: Mary Anselm) (1893–1945), Professed Religious of the Dominican Sisters of Eastern Australia and the Solomon Islands (Australia)
- James Luke Devine (1905–1947), Professed Priest of the Dominicans; Martyr in odium fidei (United States–China)
- Agnes Niland (rel. name: Mary Rose) (1860–1947), Founder of the Dominican Sisters of Saint Catherine of Siena of Newcastle (South Africa)
- Thomas de la Hoz (1879–1949), Professed Priest of the Dominicans; Apostolic Administrator of Shikoku and Apostolic Prefect of Formosa Island (Spain–Taiwan)
- Sigrid Undset (1882–1949), Layperson of the Diocese of Oslo; Member of the Lay Dominicans (Norway)
- Félix Leseur (1861–1950), Professed Priest of the Dominicans (France)
- Luis Mariano Torres (1924–1950), Professed Priest of the Company of Mary (Montfort Missionaries); Martyr in odium fidei (Colombia)
- John Timothy McNicholas (1877–1950), Professed Priest of the Dominicans; Archbishop of Cincinnati (Ireland–United States)
- Raphael Walter Farrell (1902–1951), Professed Priest of the Dominicans (United States)
- Jozef Lexmann (rel. name: Mikuláš) (1899–1952), Professed Priest of the Dominicans; Martyr in odium fidei (Slovakia–Czech Republic)
- Elsie Quinlan (rel. name: Mary Aidan) (1914–1952), Professed Religious of the Dominican Sisters of Saint Catherine of Siena of King William's Town; Martyr in odium fidei (Ireland-South Africa)
- Antonín Janovský (rel. name: Leo) (1928–1953), Professed Cleric of the Dominicans; Martyr in odium fidei (Czech Republic–Slovakia)
- Mary Josephine Rogers (rel. name: Mary Joseph) (1882–1955), Founder of the Maryknoll Sisters of Saint Dominic (United States)
- Josef Siemer (rel. name: Laurentius) (1888–1956), Professed Priest of the Dominicans (Germany)
- Josef Braito (rel. name: Silvestr Maria) (1898–1962), Professed Priest of the Dominicans; Martyr in odium fidei (Bulgaria–Czech Republic)
- Antonin Jaussen (1871–1962), Professed Priest of the Dominicans (France)
- Gerald Vann (1906–1963), Professed Priest of the Dominicans (United Kingdom)
- Daniel Hubertus Johannes Boormans (1931–1964), Professed Priest of the Company of Mary (Montfort Missionaries); Martyr in odium fidei (Netherlands–Mozambique)
- Gontran-Marie Garrigou-Lagrange (rel. name: Réginald Marie) (1877–1964), Professed Priest of the Dominicans (France)
- Margarete Sommer (1893–1965), Layperson of the Archdiocese of Berlin; Member of the Lay Dominicans (Germany)
- Joseba Aldamiz-Etxebarria Koskorrotza (rel. name: José) (1920–1966), Professed Priest of the Dominicans (Spain–Peru)
- Bernadette Beauté (rel. name: Marie of Saint John) (1876–1969), Founder of the Dominican Missionaries of the Countryside (France)
- Georges Charles Pire (rel. name: Dominique) (1910–1969), Professed Priest of the Dominicans (Belgium)
- Minna Rahmielovna Kugel (rel. name: Theresa) (1912–1977), Professed Religious of the Dominican Nuns (Russia–Lithuania)
- Juliette Molland (1902–1979), Layperson of the Archdiocese of Marseille; Founder of the Caritas Christi Secular Institute (France)
- Paule Marie Aimée de Mulatier (rel. name: Marie of the Trinity) (1903–1980), Professed Religious of the Dominican Missionaries of the Countryside (France)
- Carlos Morales López (1946–1980), Professed Priest of the Dominicans; Martyr in odium fidei (Guatemala)
- Gregorio Hontomin (1909–1982), Professed Religious of the Dominicans (Philippines)
- Stanisław Kowalczyk (rel. name: Honoriusz) (1935–1983), Professed Priest of the Dominicans; Martyr in odium fidei (Poland)
- Anthonius Hofstee (rel. name: Leo) (1903–1986), Professed Priest of the Dominicans (Netherlands–Philippines)
- Susan Wojciechowski (1952–1988), Professed Religious of the Dominican Sisters of Our Lady of the Rosary of Sparkill (Dominican Sisters of Sparkill); Martyr in odium fidei (United States–Pakistan)
- Róża Wanda Niewęgłowska (1928–1989), Layperson of the Archdiocese of Lublin; Member of the Lay Dominicans (Poland)
- Marcel-Léon Chenu (rel. name: Marie-Dominique) (1895–1990), Professed Priest of the Dominicans (France)
- Josef Arkenau (rel. name: Aurelius) (1900–1991), Professed Priest of the Dominicans (Germany)
- Pablo Fernández Villaroel (1917–1992), Professed Priest of the Dominicans; Founder of the Dominican Daughters of the Immaculate Mother, the Dominican Sisters of Saint Joseph; Cofounder of the Daughters of Saint Dominic and Company of Saint Dominic (Spain–Philippines)
- Georges Habra (1930–1994), Professed Priest of the Dominicans (Palestine–France)
- María Liliana Mónica Loyarte (1958–1994), Professed Religious of the Dominican Sisters of Saint Catherine of Siena; Martyr in odium fidei (Argentina–Uganda)
- Samuel Malo (1930–1994), Professed Priest of the Company of Mary (Montfort Missionaries); Martyr in odium fidei (France–Madagascar)
- Yves Marie-Joseph Congar (1904–1995), Professed Priest of the Dominicans; Cardinal (France)
- André Hussar (rel. name: Bruno) (1911–1996), Professed Priest of the Dominicans (Egypt–Israel)
- Joaquín Bernardo Barbado (1957–2000), Professed Priest of the Dominicans; Martyr in odium fidei (Spain–Albania)
- Sheila Corcoran (1925–2000), Professed Religious of the Dominican Sisters of Cabra; Martyr in odium fidei (Ireland–South Africa)
- Lucas Moreira Neves (1925–2002), Professed Priest of the Dominicans; Titular Archbishop of Vescovìo; Cardinal (Brazil–Brazil)
- Michel Perrin (rel. name: Joseph-Marie) (1905–2002), Professed Priest of the Dominicans; Founder of the Caritas Christi Secular Institute (France)
- Vincentus Shigeto Oshida (1922–2003), Professed Priest of the Dominicans (Japan)
- Kevin William Barden (1908–2004), Professed Priest of the Dominicans; Archbishop of Ispahan (Ireland)
- Jesus Sison (1918–2004), Bishop of Tarlac; Founder of the Dominican Sisters of Our Lady of Peace (Philippines)
- Thomas Richard Heath (1920–2005), Professed Priest of the Dominicans; Martyr in odium fidei (United States–Kenya)
- Renée de Tryon-Montalembert (rel. name: Renata) (1920–2007), Consecrated Virgin of the Archdiocese of Paris; Member of the Lay Dominicans (France)
- Jan Wojciech Góra (1948–2015), Professed Priest of the Dominicans (Poland)
- Franciszek Macharski (rel. name: Jacek) (1927–2016), Archbishop of Kraków; Cardinal; Member of the Priestly Fraternity of Saint Dominic
- Henri Burin des Roziers (1930–2017), Professed Priest of the Dominicans (France–Brazil)
- Maria Roszak (Cecylia) (1908–2018), Professed Religious of the Dominican Nuns (Poland)
- Giuse Trần Ngọc Thanh (1981–2022), Professed Priest of the Dominicans (Vietnam)
- Donald Hughes Salisbury (1928–2023), Professed Priest of the Dominicans (United States)

== Group Martyrs ==
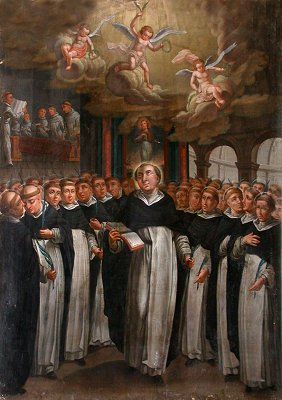
Bl. Sadok and his 48 companions.

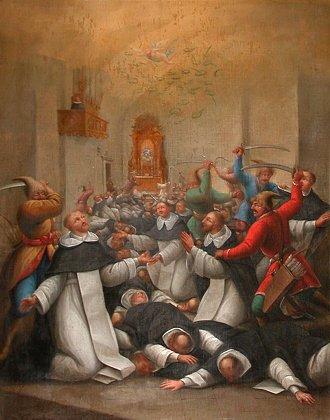
The Martyrdom of Sadok and his companions in Sandomierz.

=== Martyrs of Sandomierz (1260) ===
- Sadok (d. 1260), Professed Priest of the Dominicans
- Malachiasz (d. 1260), Professed Priest of the Dominicans
- Paweł (d. 1260), Professed Priest of the Dominicans
- Andrzej (d. 1260), Professed Priest of the Dominicans
- Piotr (d. 1260), Professed Priest of the Dominicans
- James (d. 1260), Professed Priest of the Dominicans
- Abel (d. 1260), Professed Priest of the Dominicans
- Szymon (d. 1260), Professed Priest of the Dominicans
- Klemens (d. 1260), Professed Priest of the Dominicans
- Barnaba (I) (d. 1260), Professed Priest of the Dominicans
- Eliasz (d. 1260), Professed Priest of the Dominicans
- Bartłomiej (d. 1260), Professed Priest of the Dominicans
- Łukasz (d. 1260), Professed Priest of the Dominicans
- Mateusz (d. 1260), Professed Priest of the Dominicans
- Jan (d. 1260), Professed Priest of the Dominicans
- Barnaba (II) (d. 1260), Professed Priest of the Dominicans
- Philip (d. 1260), Professed Priest of the Dominicans
- Onufrego (d. 1260), Professed Cleric of the Dominicans
- Dominik (d. 1260), Professed Cleric of the Dominicans
- Michał (d. 1260), Professed Cleric of the Dominicans
- Mateusz (d. 1260), Professed Cleric of the Dominicans
- Maur (d. 1260), Professed Cleric of the Dominicans
- Tymotka (d. 1260), Professed Cleric of the Dominicans
- Gordian (d. 1260), Professed Religious of the Dominicans
- Felicjanek (d. 1260), Professed Religious of the Dominicans
- Markus (d. 1260), Professed Religious of the Dominicans
- Jan (d. 1260), Professed Religious of the Dominicans
- Gerwaz (d. 1260), Professed Religious of the Dominicans
- Krzysztof (d. 1260), Professed Religious of the Dominicans
- Donatus (d. 1260), Professed Religious of the Dominicans
- Medart (d. 1260), Professed Religious of the Dominicans
- Valentinus (d. 1260), Professed Religious of the Dominicans
- Joachim (d. 1260), Professed Deacon of the Dominicans
- Józef (d. 1260), Professed Deacon of the Dominicans
- Stefan (d. 1260), Professed Subdeacon of the Dominicans
- Tadeusz (d. 1260), Professed Subdeacon of the Dominicans
- Mojżesz (d. 1260), Professed Subdeacon of the Dominicans
- Abraham (d. 1260), Professed Subdeacon of the Dominicans
- Bazyl (d. 1260), Professed Subdeacon of the Dominicans
- David (d. 1260), Professed Cleric of the Dominicans
- Aaron (d. 1260), Professed Cleric of the Dominicans
- Benedikt (d. 1260), Professed Cleric of the Dominicans
- Daniel (d. 1260), Novice of the Dominicans
- Tobiasz (d. 1260), Novice of the Dominicans
- Makarios (d. 1260), Novice of the Dominicans
- Rafał (d. 1260), Novice of the Dominicans
- Izajasz (d. 1260), Novice of the Dominicans
- Cyryl (d. 1260), Novice of the Dominicans
- Jeremiasz (d. 1260), Postulant of the Dominicans
  - Beatified: 18 October 1807 by Pope Pius VII

=== Martyrs of the "La Florida" Missions (1549–1715) ===
- Diego (d. 1549), Professed Priest of the Dominicans (Spain–United States)
- Fuentes (d. 1549), Oblate of the Dominicans (Spain or Mexico–United States)
- Luis Cáncer de Barbastro (c. 1500–1549), Professed Priest of the Dominicans (Spain–United States)

=== Martyrs of Ireland (1572–1681) ===
- Peter O'Higgins [Peadar Ó hUiginn] (c. 1600–1642), Professed Priest of the Dominicans (Ireland)
- Terence Albert O'Brien [Toirdhealbhach Albert Ó Briain] (1601–1651), Professed Priest of the Dominicans; Bishop of Emly (Ireland)
  - Declared "Venerable": 6 July 1991
  - Beatified: 27 September 1992 by Pope John Paul II
- John Bourke (1550–1607), Married Layperson of the Diocese of Limerick; Member of the Confraternity of the Rosary (Ireland)
- Richard Barry (d. 1647), Professed Priest of the Dominicans (Ireland)
- Dominic Dillon (d. 1649), Professed Priest of the Dominicans (Ireland)
- Richard Overton (d. 1649), Professed Priest of the Dominicans (Ireland)
- Laurence O'Ferrall (d. 1649), Professed Priest of the Dominicans (Ireland)
- Bernard O'Ferrall (d. 1649), Professed Priest of the Dominicans (Ireland)
- Thaddeus Moriarty (d. 1653), Professed Priest of the Dominicans (Ireland)

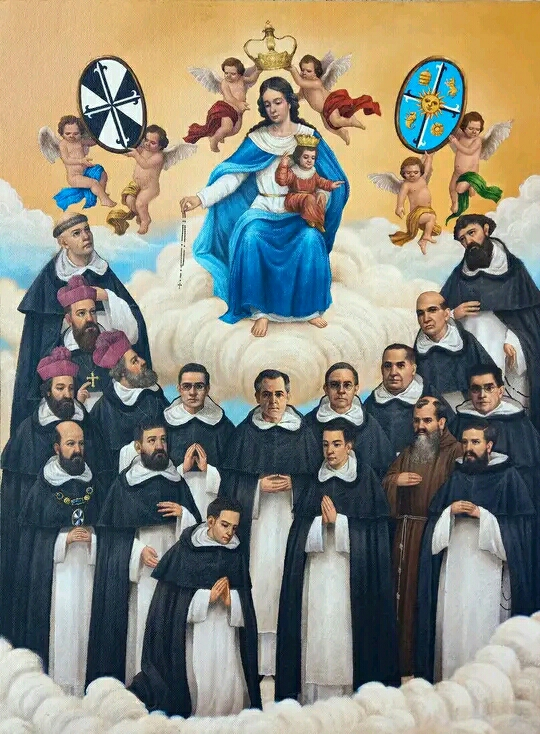
17 Thomasian Martyrs

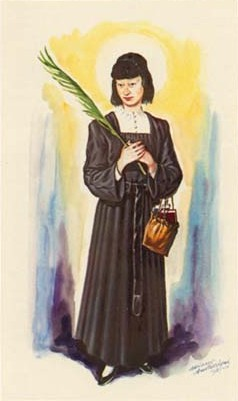
Magdalena of Nagasaki

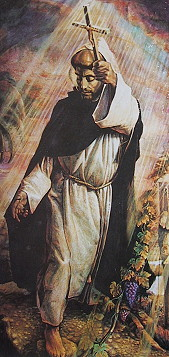
Giacinto Giordano Ansalone

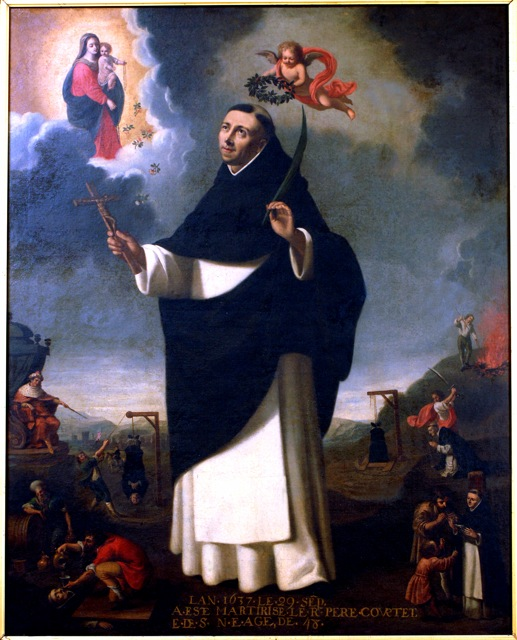
Guillaume Courtet

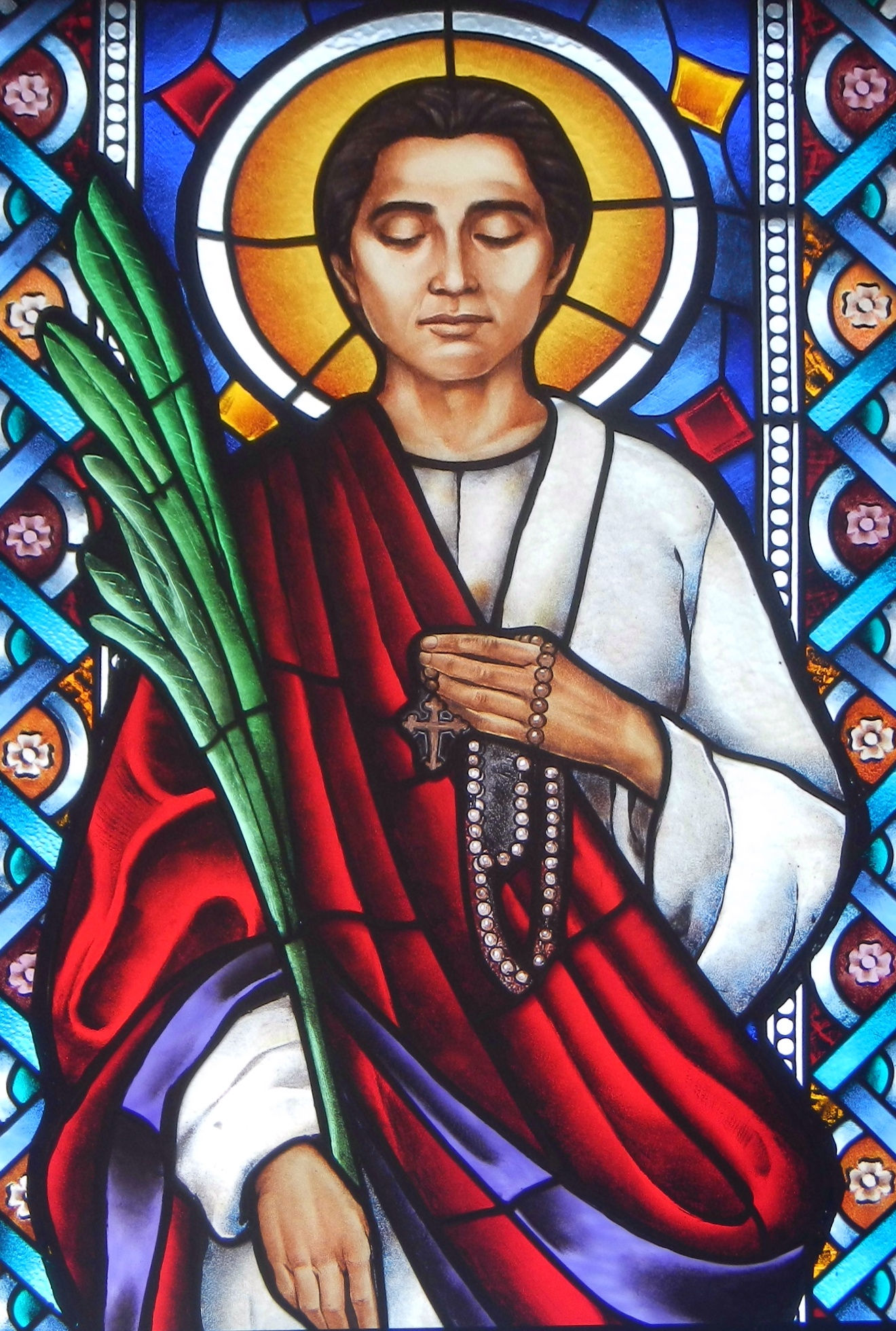
Lorenzo Ruiz

=== Martyrs of Japan (1597–1637) ===
- Domingo Ibáñez de Erquicia Pérez de Lete (1589–1633), Professed Priest of the Dominicans (Spain–Japan)
- Franciscus Shōemon (d. 1633), Professed Religious of the Dominicans (Japan)
- Iacobus Tomonaga Gorōbyōe (rel. name: Iacobus of Saint Mary) (1582–1633), Professed Priest of the Dominicans (Japan)
- Michaël Kurōbyōe (d. 1633), Layperson of the Archdiocese of Nagasaki; Catechist (Japan)
- Matthaeus Kohyōe (1615–1633), Novice of the Dominicans (Japan)
- Lucas Alonso Gorda (rel. name: Lucas of the Holy Spirit) (1594–1633), Professed Priest of the Dominicans (Spain–Japan)
- Magdalena (c. 1610–1634), Young Layperson of the Archdiocese of Nagasaki; Member of the Lay Augustinian Recollects and Lay Dominicans (Japan)
- Marina (d. 1634), Layperson of the Archdiocese of Nagasaki; Member of Lay Dominicans (Japan)
- Giordano Ansalone (rel. name: Giordano of Saint Stephen) (1598–1634), Professed Priest of the Dominicans (Italy–Japan)
- Thomas Hioji Nishi Rokuzaemon (1590–1634), Professed Priest of the Dominicans (Japan)
- Antonio González (1593–1637), Professed Priest of the Dominicans (Spain–Japan)
- Guillaume Courtet (rel. name: Thomas of Saint Dominic) (c. 1590–1637), Professed Priest of the Dominicans (France–Japan)
- Miguel González de Aozaraza de Leibar (1598–1637), Professed Priest of the Dominicans (Spain–Japan)
- Lorenzo Ruiz (c. 1600–1637), Married Layperson of the Archdiocese of Manila; Member of the Confraternity of the Rosary (Philippines–Japan)
- Lazarus (d. 1637), Layperson of the Archdiocese of Nagasaki (Japan)
  - Declared "Venerable": 11 October 1980
  - Beatified: 18 February 1981 by Pope John Paul II
  - Canonized: 18 October 1987 by Pope John Paul II
- Alfonso Navarrete Benito (1571–1617), Professed Priest of the Dominicans (Spain–Japan)
- Gaspar Ueda Hikojirō (d. 1617), Layperson of the Archdiocese of Nagasaki; Member of the Confraternity of the Rosary (Japan)
- Andreas Yoshida (d. 1617), Layperson of the Archdiocese of Nagasaki; Member of the Confraternity of the Rosary (Japan)
- Juan Martínez Cid (rel. name: Juan of Saint Dominic) (1577–1618), Professed Priest of the Dominicans (Spain–Japan)
- Andreas Murayama Tokuyasu (d. 1619), Layperson of the Archdiocese of Nagasaki; Member of the Confraternity of the Rosary (Japan)
- Cosmas Takeya Chōbei (d. 1619), Layperson of the Archdiocese of Nagasaki; Member of the Confraternity of the Rosary (Japan)
- Ioannes Yoshida Shōemon Shoun (d. 1619), Layperson of the Archdiocese of Nagasaki; Member of the Confraternity of the Rosary (Japan)
- Domingos Jorge (d. 1619), Layperson of the Archdiocese of Nagasaki; Member of the Confraternity of the Rosary (Portugal–Japan)
- Thomas Koteda Kyūmi (c. 1576–1619), Layperson of the Archdiocese of Nagasaki; Member of the Confraternity of the Rosary (Japan)
- Bartholomaeus Seki (c. 1582–1619), Layperson of the Archdiocese of Nagasaki; Member of the Confraternity of the Rosary (Japan)
- Antonius Kimura (c. 1596–1619), Layperson of the Archdiocese of Nagasaki; Member of the Confraternity of the Rosary (Japan)
- Ioannes Iwanaga (c. 1555–1619), Layperson of the Archdiocese of Nagasaki; Member of the Confraternity of the Rosary (Japan)
- Alexius Nakamura (c. 1561–1619), Layperson of the Archdiocese of Nagasaki; Member of the Confraternity of the Rosary (Japan)
- Leo Nakanishi (c. 1577–1619), Layperson of the Archdiocese of Nagasaki; Member of the Confraternity of the Rosary (Japan)
- Michaël Takeshita (c. 1594–1619), Layperson of the Archdiocese of Nagasaki; Member of the Confraternity of the Rosary (Japan)
- Matthias Kosaka (d. 1619), Layperson of the Archdiocese of Nagasaki; Member of the Confraternity of the Rosary (Japan)
- Romanus Matsuoka Miyota (d. 1619), Layperson of the Archdiocese of Nagasaki; Member of the Confraternity of the Rosary (Japan)
- Matthias Nakano (d. 1619), Layperson of the Archdiocese of Nagasaki; Member of the Confraternity of the Rosary (Japan)
- Ioannes Motoyama (d. 1619), Layperson of the Archdiocese of Nagasaki; Member of the Confraternity of the Rosary (Japan)
  - Declared "Venerable": 26 February 1866
  - Beatified: 7 May 1867 by Pope Pius IX

=== Martyrs of Vietnam (1745–1862) ===
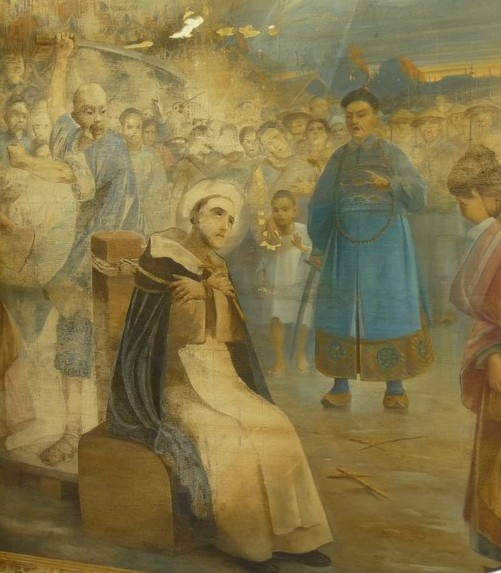
Francesc Gil de Federich

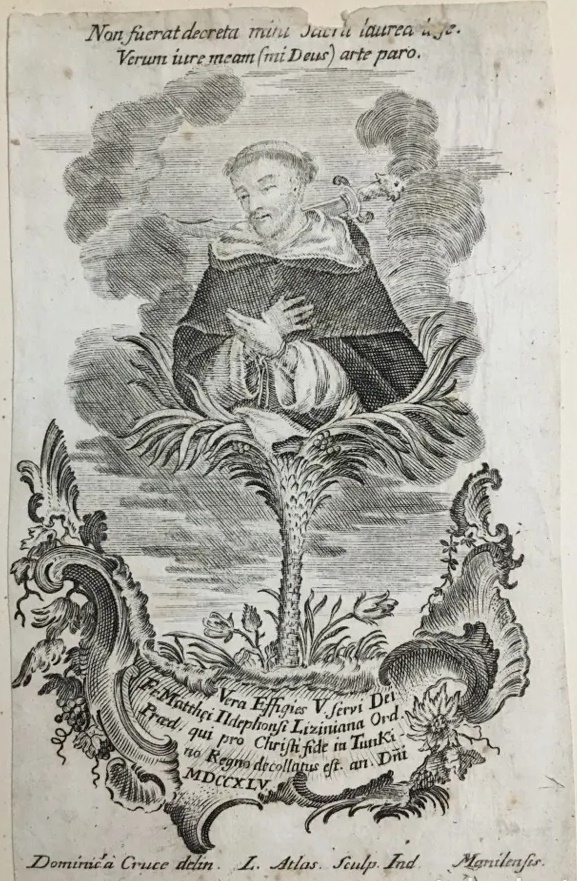
Mateo Alonso Leciniana

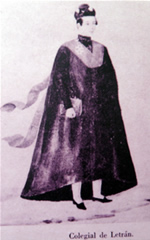
Vinh Sơn Lê Quang Liêm

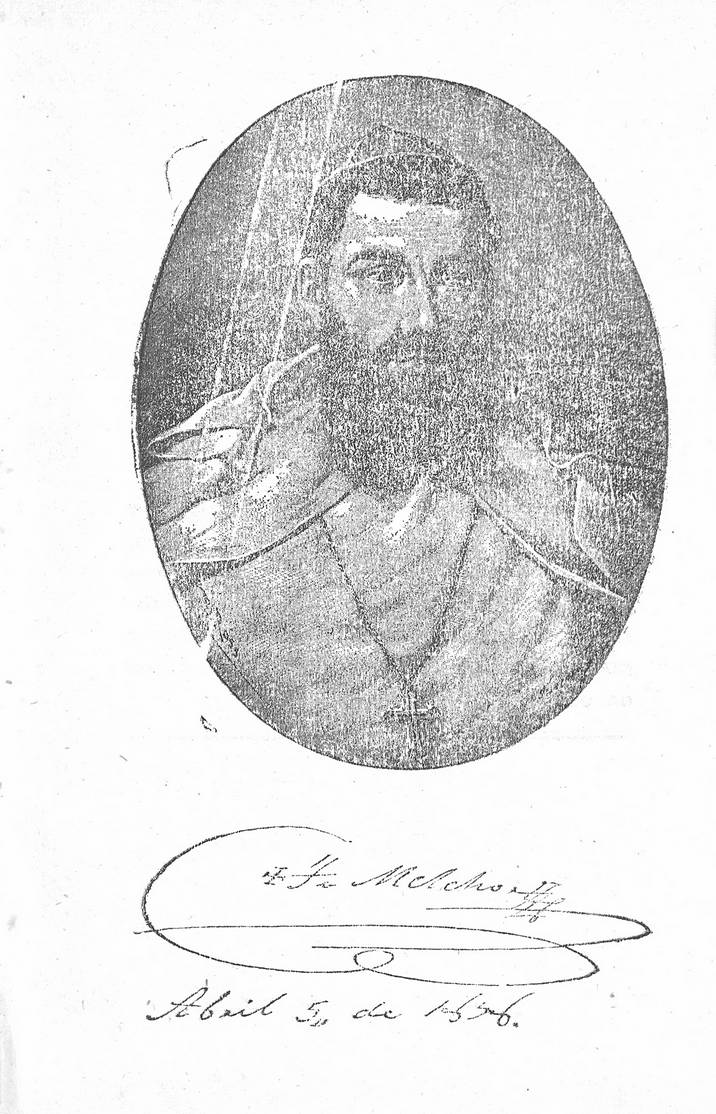
Melchor García Sampedro

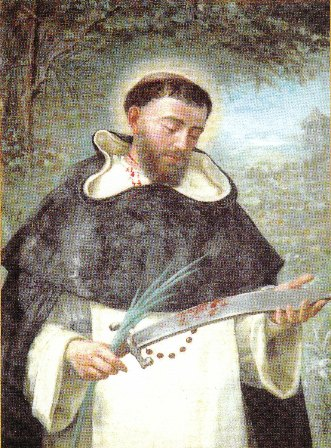
Josep Almató Ribera Auras

- Francesc Gil de Federich de Sans (1702–1745), Professed Priest of the Dominicans (Spain–Vietnam)
- Mateo Alonso de Leciniana y Alonso (1702–1745), Professed Priest of the Dominicans (Spain–Vietnam)
- Vinh Sơn Lê Quang Liêm (c. 1732–1773), Professed Priest of the Dominicans (Vietnam)
- Jacinto Castañeda Puchasóns (1743–1773), Professed Priest of the Dominicans (Spain–Vietnam)
- Domingo Henares de Zafra Cubero (1765–1838), Professed Priest of the Dominicans; Titular Bishop of Fessëe; Auxiliary Apostolic Vicar of East Tonkin (Spain–Vietnam)
- Phanxicô Đỗ Văn Chiểu (c. 1797–1838), Layperson of the Diocese of Bùi Chu; Catechist; Member of the Lay Dominicans (Vietnam)
- Vinh Sơn Đỗ Yến (c. 1764–1838), Professed Priest of the Dominicans (Vietnam)
- Giuse Nguyễn Đình Uyển (c. 1775–1838), Layperson of the Diocese of Bùi Chu; Catechist; Member of the Lay Dominicans (Vietnam)
- Clemente Ignacio Delgado Cebrián (1762–1838), Professed Priest of the Dominicans; Titular Bishop of Milopotamos; Apostolic Vicar of East Tonkin (Spain–Vietnam)
- José Fernández de Ventosa (1775–1838), Professed Priest of the Dominicans (Spain–Vietnam)
- Ðaminh Nguyễn Văn Hạnh (1772–1838), Professed Priest of the Dominicans (Vietnam)
- Phêrô Nguyễn Văn Tự (c. 1796–1838), Professed Priest of the Dominicans (Vietnam)
- Giuse Hoàng Lương Cảnh (c. 1763–1838), Layperson of the Diocese of Bắc Ninh; Catechist; Member of the Lay Dominicans (Vietnam)
- Đaminh Vũ Đình Tước (c. 1775–1838), Professed Priest of the Dominicans (Vietnam)
- Tôma Đinh Viết Dụ (c. 1783–1839), Professed Priest of the Dominicans (Vietnam)
- Đaminh Nguyễn Văn Xuyên (c. 1786–1839), Professed Priest of the Dominicans (Vietnam)
- Phanxicô Xaviê Hà Trọng Mậu (c. 1790–1839), Layperson of the Diocese of Bắc Ninh; Catechist; Member of the Lay Dominicans (Vietnam)
- Ðaminh Bùi Văn Úy (c. 1812–1839), Layperson of the Diocese of Bắc Ninh; Catechist; Member of the Lay Dominicans (Vietnam)
- Augustinô Nguyễn Văn Mới (c. 1806–1839), Layperson of the Diocese of Bắc Ninh; Member of the Lay Dominicans (Vietnam)
- Tôma Nguyễn Văn Đệ (c. 1811–1839), Layperson of the Diocese of Bắc Ninh; Member of the Lay Dominicans (Vietnam)
- Stêphanô Nguyễn Văn Vinh (c. 1814–1839), Layperson of the Diocese of Bắc Ninh; Member of the Lay Dominicans (Vietnam)
- Giuse Ðỗ Quang Hiển (c. 1769–1840), Professed Priest of the Dominicans (Vietnam)
- Tôma Đào Đình Toán (c. 1764–1840), Layperson of the Diocese of Thái Bình; Catechist; Member of the Lay Dominicans (Vietnam)
- José María Díaz Sanjurjo (1818–1858), Professed Priest of the Dominicans; Titular Bishop of Plataea; Apostolic Vicar of Central Tonkin (Spain–Vietnam)
- José Melchór García-Sampedro Suárez (1821–1858), Professed Priest of the Dominicans; Titular Bishop of Tricomia; Auxiliary Bishop of Central Tonkin (Spain–Vietnam)
- Đaminh Đinh Đức Mậu (c. 1808–1858), Professed Priest of the Dominicans (Vietnam)
- Đaminh Phạm Trọng Khảm (c. 1780–1859), Married Layperson of the Diocese of Bùi Chu; Member of the Lay Dominicans (Vietnam)
- Giuse Phạm Trọng Tả (c. 1800–1859), Married Layperson of the Diocese of Bùi Chu; Member of the Lay Dominicans (Vietnam)
- Luca Phạm Trọng Thìn (c. 1820–1859), Married Layperson of the Diocese of Bùi Chu; Member of the Lay Dominicans (Vietnam)
- Ðaminh Cẩm (d. 1859), Priest of the Diocese of Bắc Ninh; Member of the Dominican Fraternity of Priests (Vietnam)
- Tôma Ngô Túc Khuông (c. 1789–1860), Priest of the Diocese of Thái Bình; Member of the Dominican Fraternity of Priests (Vietnam)
- Giuse Trần Văn Tuấn (c. 1821–1861), Professed Priest of the Dominicans (Vietnam)
- Jerónimo Hermosilla Aransáez (1800–1861), Professed Priest of the Dominicans; Titular Bishop of Miletopolis; Apostolic Vicar of East Tonkin (Spain–Vietnam)
- Valentín Berrio-Ochoa de Aristi (1827–1861), Professed Priest of the Dominicans; Titular Bishop of Centuria; Apostolic Vicar of Central Tonkin (Spain–Vietnam)
- Josep Almató Ribera Auras (1830–1861), Professed Priest of the Dominicans (Spain–Vietnam)
- Giuse Nguyễn Duy Khang (1832–1861), Layperson of the Diocese of Thái Bình; Catechist; Member of the Lay Dominicans (Vietnam)
  - Beatified: 27 May 1900 by Pope Leo XIII; 20 May 1906 and 2 May 1909 by Pope Pius X; and 29 April 1951 by Pope Pius XII
  - Canonized: 19 June 1988 by Pope John Paul II

=== Martyrs of the French Revolution (1794–1799) ===
- Marie-Gabrielle-Françoise-Suzanne de Gaillard de Lavaldène (rel. name: Iphigénie of Saint Matthew) (1761–1794), Professed Religious of the Sacramentine Nuns (France)
- Rosalie-Clotilde Bes (rel. name: Sœur Pelagia of Saint John the Baptist) (1753–1794), Professed Religious of the Sacramentine Nuns (France)
- Marie-Elisabeth Pélissier (rel. name: Théotiste of the Blessed Sacrament) (1741–1794), Professed Religious of the Sacramentine Nuns (France)
- Marie-Clotilde Blanc (rel. name: Sœur Saint Martin) (1742–1794), Professed Religious of the Sacramentine Nuns (France)
- Madeleine-Thérèse Talieu (rel. name: Rose of Saint Xavier) (1746–1794), Professed Religious of the Sacramentine Nuns (France)
- Marie Cluse (rel. name: Marthe of the Good Angel) (1761–1794), Professed Religious of the Sacramentine Nuns (France)
- Élisabeth Verchière (rel. name: Madeleine of the Mother of God) (1769–1794), Professed Religious of the Sacramentine Nuns (France)
- Thérèse-Henriette Faurie (rel. name: Marie of the Annunciation) (1770–1794), Professed Religious of the Sacramentine Nuns (France)
- Anne-Andrée Minutte (rel. name: Sœur Saint Alexis) (1740–1794), Professed Religious of the Sacramentine Nuns (France)
- Marguerite-Rose de Gordon (rel. name: Aimée of Jesus) (1733–1794), Professed Religious of the Sacramentine Nuns (France)
- Marguerite-Thérèse Charensol (rel. name: Marie of Jesus of the Conception of the Blessed Sacrament) (1758–1794), Professed Religious of the Sacramentine Nuns (France)
- Marie-Anne Béguin-Royal (rel. name: Sœur Saint Joachim) (1736–1794), Professed Religious of the Sacramentine Nuns (France)
- Marie-Marguerite Bonnet (rel. name: Sœur Saint Augustine) (1719–1794), Professed Religious of the Sacramentine Nuns (France)
  - Declared "Venerable": 19 March 1925
  - Beatified: 10 May 1925 by Pope Pius XI

=== Martyrs of the Paris Commune (1871) ===
- François-Eugène Captier (rel. name: Louis-Raphaël) (1829–1871), Professed Priest of the Third Order of Saint Dominic for the Education of the Youth (now extinct)
- Louis-Ferdinand Bourard (rel. name: Thomas) (1818–1871), Professed Priest of the Third Order of Saint Dominic for the Education of the Youth (now extinct)
- Eugène Delhorme (rel. name: Constant) (1831–1871), Professed Priest of the Third Order of Saint Dominic for the Education of the Youth (now extinct)
- Henri Cotrault (1840–1871), Professed Priest of the Third Order of Saint Dominic for the Education of the Youth (now extinct)
- Gabriel Chatagneret (rel. name: Pie-Marie) (1841–1871), Professed Priest of the Third Order of Saint Dominic for the Education of the Youth (now extinct)
- Louis-Eugène-Antoine Gauquelin (1839–1871), Married Layperson of the Archdiocese of Paris
- François-Hermand Volant (1828–1871), Layperson of the Archdiocese of Paris
- Aimé Gros (1835–1871), Layperson of the Archdiocese of Paris
- Antoine-Gézelin Marce (1831–1871), Married Layperson of the Archdiocese of Paris
- Théodore Cathala (1830–1871), Married Layperson of the Archdiocese of Paris
- François-Sébastien-Siméon Dintroz (1838–1871), Layperson of the Archdiocese of Paris
- Marie-Joseph Cheminal (1815–1871), Layperson of the Archdiocese of Paris
- Germain-Joseph Petit (1849–1871), Young Layperson of the Archdiocese of Paris

=== Martyrs of the Spanish Civil War (1934–1939) ===
==== Dominican Province of Aragón ====
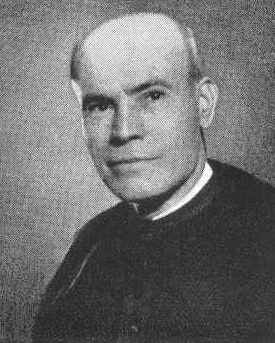
Matías Manuel Albert Ginés

- Matías Manuel Albert Ginés (1867–1936), Priest of the Diocese of Zaragoza; Member of the Dominican Fraternity of Priests
- Antonio Manuel López Couceiro (1869–1936), Professed Priest of the Dominicans
- Lucio Martínez Mancebo (1902–1936), Professed Priest of the Dominicans
- Felicísimo Díez González (1907–1936), Professed Priest of the Dominicans
- Saturio Rey Robles (1907–1936), Professed Priest of the Dominicans
- Tirso Manrique Melero (1877–1936), Professed Priest of the Dominicans
- Gumersindo Soto Barros (1869–1936), Professed Priest of the Dominicans
- Lamberto María de Navascués de Juan (1911–1936), Novice of the Dominicans
- Zósimo Izquierdo Gil (1895–1936), Priest of the Diocese of Zaragoza; Member of the Dominican Fraternity of Priests
- José María Muro Sanmiguel (1905–1936), Professed Priest of the Dominicans
- Joaquín Prats Baltueña (1915–1936), Novice of the Dominicans
- Francisco Calvo Burillo (1881–1936), Professed Priest of the Dominicans
- Luis Urbano Lanaspa (1882–1936), Professed Priest of the Dominicans
- Ramon Peiró Victori (1891–1936), Professed Priest of the Dominicans
- Francisco Monzón Romeo (1912–1936), Professed Priest of the Dominicans
- Constantino Fernández Álvarez (1907–1936), Professed Priest of the Dominicans
- Josep María Vidal Segú (1912–1936), Professed Priest of the Dominicans
- Rafael Pardo Molina (1899–1936), Professed Religious of the Dominicans
- Santiago Meseguer Burillo (1885–1936), Professed Priest of the Dominicans
- Jacinto Serrano López (1901–1936), Professed Priest of the Dominicans
  - Declared "Venerable": 20 December 1999
  - Beatified: 11 March 2001 by Pope John Paul II

==== Provinces of the Holy Rosary (SR), Spain (ES), and Bética (BE) ====
- Abraham Furones y Furones [Arenas] (rel. name: Luis) (1892–1936), Professed Priest of the Dominicans (ES)
- Jacinto García Riesco (1894–1936), Professed Priest of the Dominicans (ES)
- José López Tascón (1896–1936), Professed Priest of the Dominicans (ES)
- José Luis Palacio Muñiz (1870–1936), Professed Priest of the Dominicans (SR)
- Antonio Varona Ortega (1901–1936), Professed Priest of the Dominicans (SR)
- Higinio Roldan Iriberri (1895–1936), Professed Priest of the Dominicans (SR)
- Juan Crespo Calleja (1895–1936), Professed Religious of the Dominicans (SR)
- Manuel Moreno Martínez (1862–1936), Professed Priest of the Dominicans (SR)
- Maximino Fernández Marinas (1867–1936), Professed Priest of the Dominicans (SR)
- Victor García Ceballos (1880–1936), Professed Priest of the Dominicans (SR)
- Eduardo González Santo Domingo (1889–1936), Professed Religious of the Dominicans (SR)
- Buenaventura García-Paredes Pallasá (1866–1936), Professed Priest of the Dominicans; 78th Master General (SR)
- Inocencio García Díez (1875–1936), Professed Priest of the Dominicans (SR)
- Luciano Hernández Ramírez (rel. name: Reginaldo) (1909–1936), Professed Priest of the Dominicans (ES)
- Josep Santonja Pinsach (1879–1936), Professed Priest of the Dominicans (SR)
- Vicente Álvarez Cienfuegos (1863–1936), Professed Priest of the Dominicans (ES)
- Pedro Ibáñez Alonso (1892–1936), Professed Priest of the Dominicans (SR)
- José María López Carrillo (1892–1936), Professed Priest of the Dominicans (SR)
- Nicasio Romo Rubio (1891–1936), Professed Religious of the Dominicans (SR)
- Leoncio Arce Urrutia (1899–1936), Professed Priest of the Dominicans (SR)
- Manuel Alvarez y Alvarez (1871–1936), Professed Priest of the Dominicans (SR)
- Teófilo Montes Calvo (1912–1936), Professed Religious of the Dominicans (SR)
- José Gafo Muñiz (1881–1936), Professed Priest of the Dominicans (ES)
- Cipriano Alguacil Torredenaida (1884–1936), Professed Priest of the Dominicans (SR)
- Jesús Villaverde Andrés (1877–1936), Professed Priest of the Dominicans (SR)
- Isabelino Carmona Fernández (1908–1936), Professed Priest of the Dominicans (ES)
- Alfredo Fanjul Acebal (1867–1936), Professed Priest of the Dominicans (ES)
- Juan Mendibelzúa Ocerín (1878–1936), Professed Priest of the Dominicans (ES)
- Vicente Rodríguez Fernández (1897–1936), Professed Priest of the Dominicans (ES)
- José Delgado Pérez (1917–1936), Professed Cleric of the Dominicans (BE)
- Vidal Luis Gómara (1891–1936), Professed Priest of the Dominicans (ES)
- Félix Alonso Muñiz (1896–1936), Professed Priest of the Dominicans (ES)
- Juan Herrero Arroyo (1859–1936), Professed Religious of the Dominicans (SR)
- José Prieto Fuentes (1913–1936), Professed Cleric of the Dominicans (BE)
- Amado Cubeñas Díaz-Madrazo (1880–1936), Professed Priest of the Dominicans (SR)
- Juan Peña Ruiz (rel. name: Vicente) (1883–1936), Professed Priest of the Dominicans (ES)
- Manuel Santiago y Santiago (1916–1936), Professed Cleric of the Dominicans (BE)
- Francisco Fernández Escosura (1917–1936), Professed Cleric of the Dominicans (BE)
  - Declared "Venerable": 26 June 2006
  - Beatified: 28 October 2007 by Cardinal José Saraiva Martins, CMF

==== Dominicans of Almagro ====
- Antolín Martínez-Santos Ysern (1914–1936), Novice of the Dominicans
- José Garrido Francés (1893–1936), Professed Priest of the Dominicans
- Santiago de Prado Fernández (rel. name: Mateo) (1907–1936), Professed Religious of the Dominicans
- Justo Vicente Martínez (1913–1936), Professed Cleric of the Dominicans
- Paulino Reoyo García (1913–1936), Professed Cleric of the Dominicans
- Santiago Aparicio López (1913–1936), Professed Cleric of the Dominicans
- Ricardo Manuel López y López (1914–1936), Professed Cleric of the Dominicans
- Ángel Marina Álvarez (1890–1936), Professed Priest of the Dominicans
- Manuel Fernández-Herba Pereira (1878–1936), Professed Priest of the Dominicans
- Antonio Trancho Andrés (1900–1936), Professed Priest of the Dominicans
- Natalio Camazón Junquera (1873–1936), Professed Priest of the Dominicans
- Luis Suárez Velasco (1897–1936), Professed Priest of the Dominicans
- Eduardo Sáinz Lantarón (1906–1936), Professed Priest of the Dominicans
- Pedro López Delgado (1909–1936), Professed Priest of the Dominicans
- Francisco Santos Cadierno (1913–1936), Professed Cleric of the Dominicans
- Sebastián Sáinz López (1915–1936), Professed Cleric of the Dominicans
- Arsenio de la Viuda Solla (1880–1936), Professed Religious of the Dominicans
- Ovidio Bravo Porras (1908–1936), Professed Religious of the Dominicans
- Dionisio Pérez García (1912–1936), Professed Religious of the Dominicans
- Fernando García de Dios (1916–1936), Novice of the Dominicans
  - Declared "Venerable": 11 December 2019
  - Beatified: 18 June 2022 by Cardinal Marcello Semeraro

==== Dominicans of Barcelona ====
- Antero Mateo García (1875–1936), Married Layperson of the Archdiocese of Barcelona; Member of the Lay Dominicans
- Miquel Peiro Victori (1887–1936), Married Layperson of the Archdiocese of Barcelona; Member of the Lay Dominicans
- Ventureta Sauleda Paulís (rel. name: Josefina) (1885–1936), Professed Religious of the Dominican Nuns
- María del Carmen Zaragoza y Zaragoza (1888–1936), Professed Religious of the Dominican Sisters of Education of the Immaculata
- María Rosa Adrover Martí (1888–1936), Professed Religious of the Dominican Sisters of Education of the Immaculata
- Ramona Fossas Románs (1881–1936), Professed Religious of the Dominican Sisters of the Annunciata
- Adelfa Soro Bó (1887–1936), Professed Religious of the Dominican Sisters of the Annunciata
- Teresa Prats Martí (1896–1936), Professed Religious of the Dominican Sisters of the Annunciata
- Otilia Alonso González (1916–1936), Professed Religious of the Dominican Sisters of the Annunciata
- Ramon Perramón Vila (1898–1936), Professed Religious of the Dominican Sisters of the Annunciata
- Reginalda Picas Planas (1895–1936), Professed Religious of the Dominican Sisters of the Annunciata
- Rosa Jutglar Gallart (1900–1936), Professed Religious of the Dominican Sisters of the Annunciata
  - Declared "Venerable": 19 December 2005
  - Beatified: 28 October 2007 by Cardinal José Saraiva Martins, CMF
- Florentino Fernández de Fuentes (1870–1936), Professed Priest of the Dominicans
- José García Díaz (1880–1936), Professed Priest of the Dominicans
- Cándido Fernández García (1888–1936), Professed Priest of the Dominicans
- Manuel Escabias García (1891–1936), Professed Priest of the Dominicans

==== Dominicans of Ocaña and Almagro ====
- José Mira Lloret (1872–1936), Professed Priest of the Dominicans
- Ubaldo Albacete Moraleda (1909–1936), Professed Religious of the Dominicans
- Félix Osés Abaurre (1866–1936), Professed Priest of the Dominicans
- Canuto Arregui Luis (1867–1936), Professed Priest of the Dominicans
- Isaías Arroyo San José (1904–1936), Professed Priest of the Dominicans
- Casimiro Adeva Fernández (1876–1936), Professed Priest of the Dominicans
- Floro Casamitjana Carrera (1867–1936), Professed Priest of the Dominicans
- Antonio Abad Bernad (1890–1936), Professed Priest of the Dominicans
- José Pérez García (1895–1936), Professed Priest of the Dominicans
- Toribio Fuertes Cabello (1901–1936), Professed Priest of the Dominicans

==== Other Dominican Martyrs ====
- Concepciò Bosch Massó (rel. name: Maria Lurdes) (1888–1936), Professed Religious of the Dominican Beatas of Girona (now extinct)
- Carles Bosch Massó (1882–1936), Layperson of the Diocese of Girona
- Rosa Bosch Massó (1884–1936), Layperson of the Diocese of Girona
- Tomasa Medina González de Candinas (1891–1936), Married Layperson of the Archdiocese of Toledo; Member of the Lay Dominicans
- María del Carmen Candinas Medina (1917–1936), Young Layperson of the Archdiocese of Toledo

=== Martyrs killed in odium fidei by Nazis ===
==== Martyred under the Nazis in Poland ====
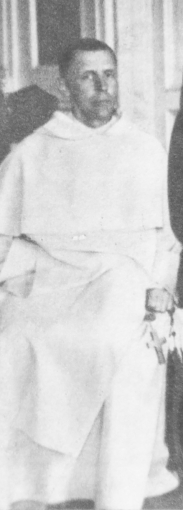
Michał Czartoryski

- Jan Franciszek Czartoryski (rel. name: Michał) (1897–1944), Professed Priest of the Dominicans (Poland)
- Stanisława Maria Józefa Rodzińska (rel. name: Maria Julia) (1899–1945), Professed Religious of the Sisters of Saint Dominic (Dominican Sisters of Poland) (Poland)
  - Declared "Venerable": 26 March 1999
  - Beatified: 13 June 1999 by Pope John Paul II

=== Martyrs killed in odium fidei under Communist Regimes ===
==== Dominican Martyrs of Chortkiv ====
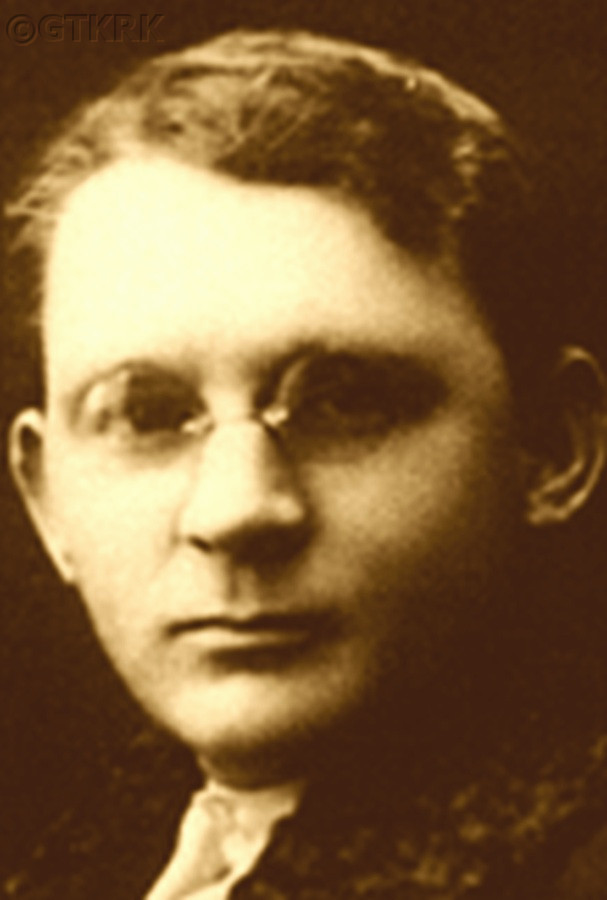
Justyn Spyrłak

- Jan Spyrłak (rel. name: Justyn) (1895–1941), Professed Priest of the Dominicans (Poland–Ukraine)
- Franciszek Longawa (rel. name: Hieronim) (1872–1941), Professed Priest of the Dominicans (Poland–Ukraine)
- Stanisław Misiuta (rel. name: Jacek) (1909–1941), Professed Priest of the Dominicans (Poland–Ukraine)
- Adam Znamirowski (rel. name: Anatol) (1910–1941), Professed Priest of the Dominicans (Poland–Ukraine)
- Stanisław Bojakowski (rel. name: Andrzej) (1897–1941), Professed Religious of the Dominicans (Ukraine)
- Martin Czerwonka (rel. name: Reginald) (1857–1941), Professed Religious of the Dominicans (Poland–Ukraine)
- Karol Iwaniszczów (rel. name: Metody) (1910–1941), Professed Religious of the Dominicans (Ukraine)
- Józef Wincentowicz (1869–1941), Layperson of the Archdiocese of Lviv of the Latins; Member of the Lay Dominicans (Poland–Ukraine)

=== Martyrs of the Simba rebellion (1963–1965) ===
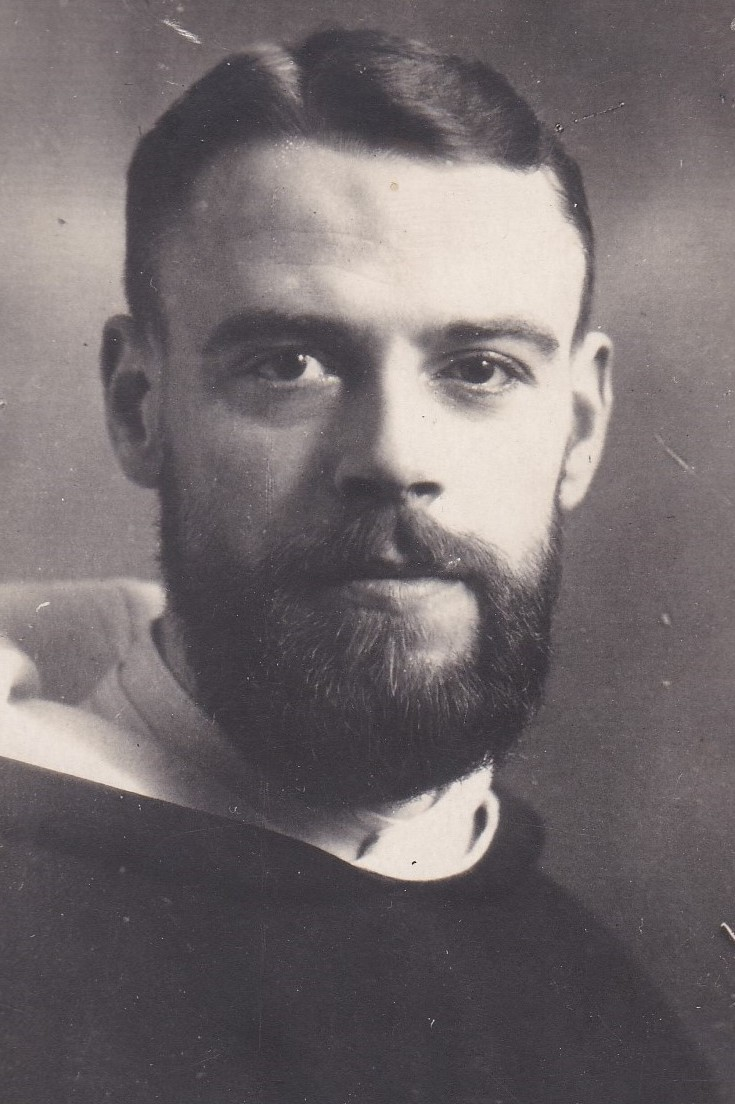
Fr. Valentinus Dox

- Walther Cornelis Vennis (rel. name: Clemens) (1901–1964), Professed Religious of the Company of Mary (Montfort Missionaries) (Netherlands)
- Leonardus Maria Ammerlaan (1932–1964), Professed Priest of the Company of Mary (Montfort Missionaries) (Netherlands)
- Anne Lucy Donniacuo (rel. name: Marie Antoinette) (1912–1964), Professed Religious of the Daughters of Wisdom (United States)
- Christiane Guillaume (rel. name: Anne-Françoise) (1928–1964), Professed Religious of the Daughters of Wisdom (Belgium)
- Justa Álvarez Yaben (rel. name: María Justa of Jesus) (1914–1964), Professed Religious of the Missionary Dominican Sisters of the Rosary (Spain)
- Rosalia Gorostiaga Ochagavia (rel. name: María Olimpia of the Sacred Heart) (1926–1964), Professed Religious of the Missionary Dominican Sisters of the Rosary (Spain)
- Pilar Eslava Sola (rel. name: María Cándida of Jesus) (1934–1964), Professed Religious of the Missionary Dominican Sisters of the Rosary (Spain)
- Angelina del Prado Zorita (rel. name: María del Buen Consejo of the Eucharist) (1937–1964), Professed Religious of the Missionary Dominican Sisters of the Rosary (Spain)
- Karel van den Broek (rel. name: Ignatius) (1911–1964), Professed Priest of the Dominicans (Belgium)
- Jozef Robberechts (rel. name: Valentinus) (1920–1964), Professed Priest of the Dominicans (Belgium)
- Albert Martin (rel. name: Pie) (1923–1964), Professed Priest of the Dominicans (Belgium)
- Jean Deltour (rel. name: Xavier) (1931–1964), Professed Priest of the Dominicans (Belgium)
- Petrus Dox (rel. name: Valentinus) (1898–1964), Professed Priest of the Dominicans (Belgium)
- Frans Dox (rel. name: Hilarius) (1907–1964), Professed Priest of the Dominicans (Belgium)
- Karel Jacobs (rel. name: Laurent) (1902–1964), Professed Priest of the Dominicans (Belgium)
- Alex Duchesne (rel. name: Réginald) (1910–1964), Professed Priest of the Dominicans (Belgium)
- Maurits Broché (rel. name: Petrus) (1898–1964), Professed Religious of the Dominicans (Belgium)
- Michel Baeyens (rel. name: Jacobus) (1914–1964), Professed Religious of the Dominicans (Belgium)
- Germaine Pepinster (rel. name: Rose of Saint Mary) (1895–1964), Professed Religious of the Dominican Missionary Sisters of Namur (Belgium)
- Simone Longly (rel. name: Marie of the Rosary) (1899–1964), Professed Religious of the Dominican Missionary Sisters of Namur (Belgium)
- Jeanne Merry (rel. name: Marie Gabriel) (1906–1964), Professed Religious of the Dominican Missionary Sisters of Namur (Belgium)
- Elisabeth Caprasse (rel. name: Marie Agnes) (1931–1964), Professed Religious of the Dominican Missionary Sisters of Namur (Belgium)
- Ida Royer (rel. name: Marie Michel) (1916–1964), Professed Religious of the Dominican Missionary Sisters of Namur (Belgium)
- Juliette Branle (rel. name: Génèvieve) (1922–1964), Professed Religious of the Dominican Missionary Sisters of Namur (Belgium)
- Luce Balfroid (rel. name: Véronique) (1922–1964), Professed Religious of the Dominican Missionary Sisters of Namur (Belgium)
- Louise Georges (rel. name: Marie Louise) (1923–1964), Professed Religious of the Dominican Missionary Sisters of Namur (Belgium)
- Jeanne Marie Burnotte (rel. name: Marie Vinciane) (1935–1964), Professed Religious of the Dominican Missionary Sisters of Namur (Belgium)
- Frans van den Wyngaert (rel. name: Augustinus) (1909–1964), Professed Priest of the Dominicans (Belgium)
- Norbert Cools (rel. name: Jozef) (1915–1964), Professed Priest of the Dominicans (Belgium)
- Marcel de Doncker (rel. name: Vincent) (1912–1964), Professed Religious of the Dominicans (Belgium)
- Ludovicus van Loon (rel. name: Leonard de Port-Maurice) (1898–1965), Professed Religious of the Brothers of Saint Gabriel (Belgium)
- Ludovic Bosmans (rel. name: Laurent-Joseph) (1900–1965), Professed Religious of the Brothers of Saint Gabriel (Belgium)
- Marcel Verschueren (rel. name: Stanislas-Joseph) (1909–1965), Professed Religious of the Brothers of Saint Gabriel (Belgium)
- Frans de Kegel (rel. name: Bernard-Joseph) (1925–1965), Professed Religious of the Brothers of Saint Gabriel (Belgium)
- Jeroom Asselman (rel. name: Gilbert-François) (1930–1965), Professed Religious of the Brothers of Saint Gabriel (Belgium)
- Gilbert Félix de Zwaef (rel. name: Guido-Maria) (1932–1965), Professed Religious of the Brothers of Saint Gabriel (Belgium)
- Hubert Jacobs (rel. name: Hubert van Monfort) (1941–1965), Professed Religious of the Brothers of Saint Gabriel (Netherlands)
