= Teresa Titos Garzón =

Spanish Dominican religious sister

Servant of God Teresa de Jesús CSDG
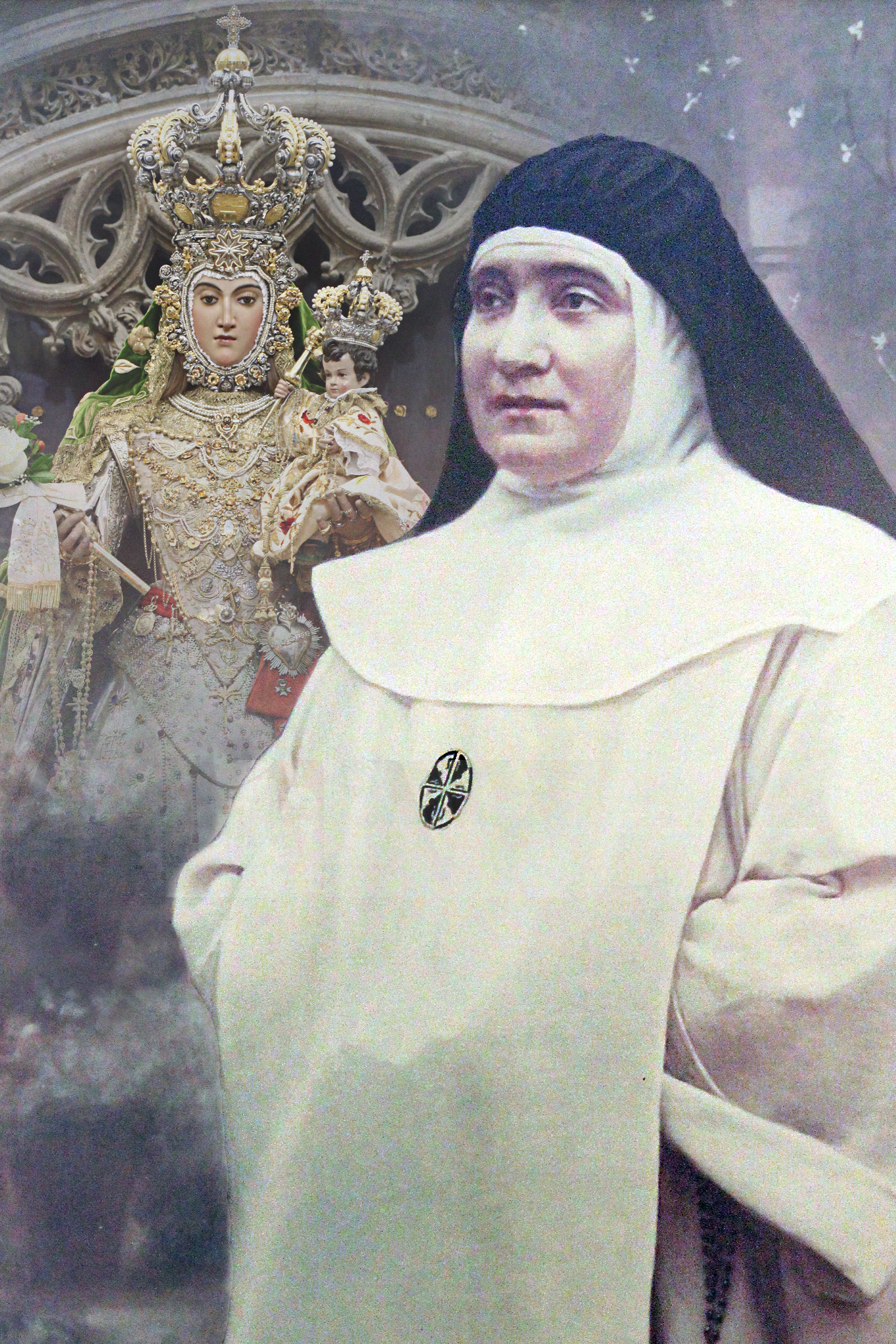
- Born: Teresa Titos Garzón; 4 January 1852; Granada, Spain
- Died: 14 February 1915 (aged 63); Granada, Spain

Teresa Titos Garzón, CSDG (religious name: Teresa de Jesús, 4 January 1852 – 14 February 1915) was a Spanish religious sister and founder of the Congregation of the Sisters of Saint Dominic of Granada. Her beatification process was opened in 1990.

== Biography ==
Teresa Titos Garzón was born on 4 January 1852 in Granada, Spain to an influential couple Fernando Titos Gómez and Isidora Garzón Moral. She was baptized a day after her birth with the name Teresa Aquilina del Espíritu Santo at the Parroquia Santa María Magdalena, Granada. Her mother died when she was very young. Being the youngest child in the family, she stayed with her sickly father, taking care of him while her older sisters got married.

In 1871, when she was 20, Teresa's father died and she decided thereafter to enter the Beaterio de Santo Domingo where she became a Dominican nun. In 1882, at the age of 31, she was elected superior of her community and devoted most of her energies to teaching humility and pursuing maximum perfection in religious life. Walking through the streets of Granada, particularly in the Barrio Realejo, she discovered the great injustice suffered by girls. In response, she created the Escuela de Santo Domingo, which took several years to build, where all girls received free education. To help continue her mission of helping and educating girls, she founded the Congregation of the Hermanas de Santo Domingo de Granada, which built numerous schools in and out of Spain.

Teresa died on 14 February 1915. Her last words were: "Let me die on the cross. How crazy we are if we are not saints. Take advantage, daughters, and do not waste your time."
