= List of Dominican friars =

The Order of Preachers, or the Dominican Order, are a Catholic mendicant order founded by Dominic de Guzman and approved by Pope Innocent III in 1216.

== Saints ==
The following friars belonging to the order have been proclaimed saints throughout history (for women and Third Order saints see List of Dominican saints and beatified):

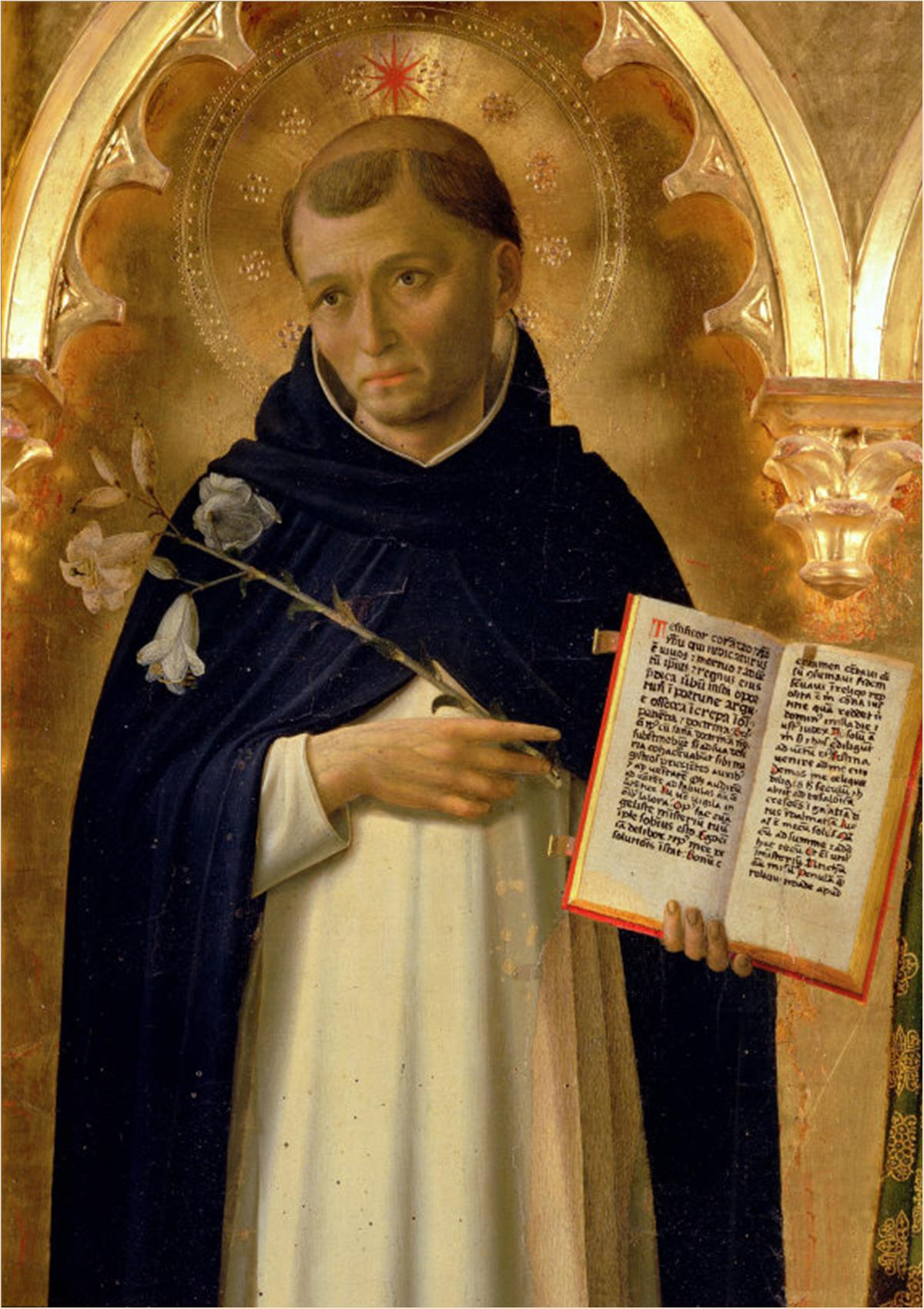
Dominic de Guzman (1170–1221), portrayed in the Perugia Altarpiece by Fra Angelico. Galleria Nazionale dell'Umbria, Perugia.

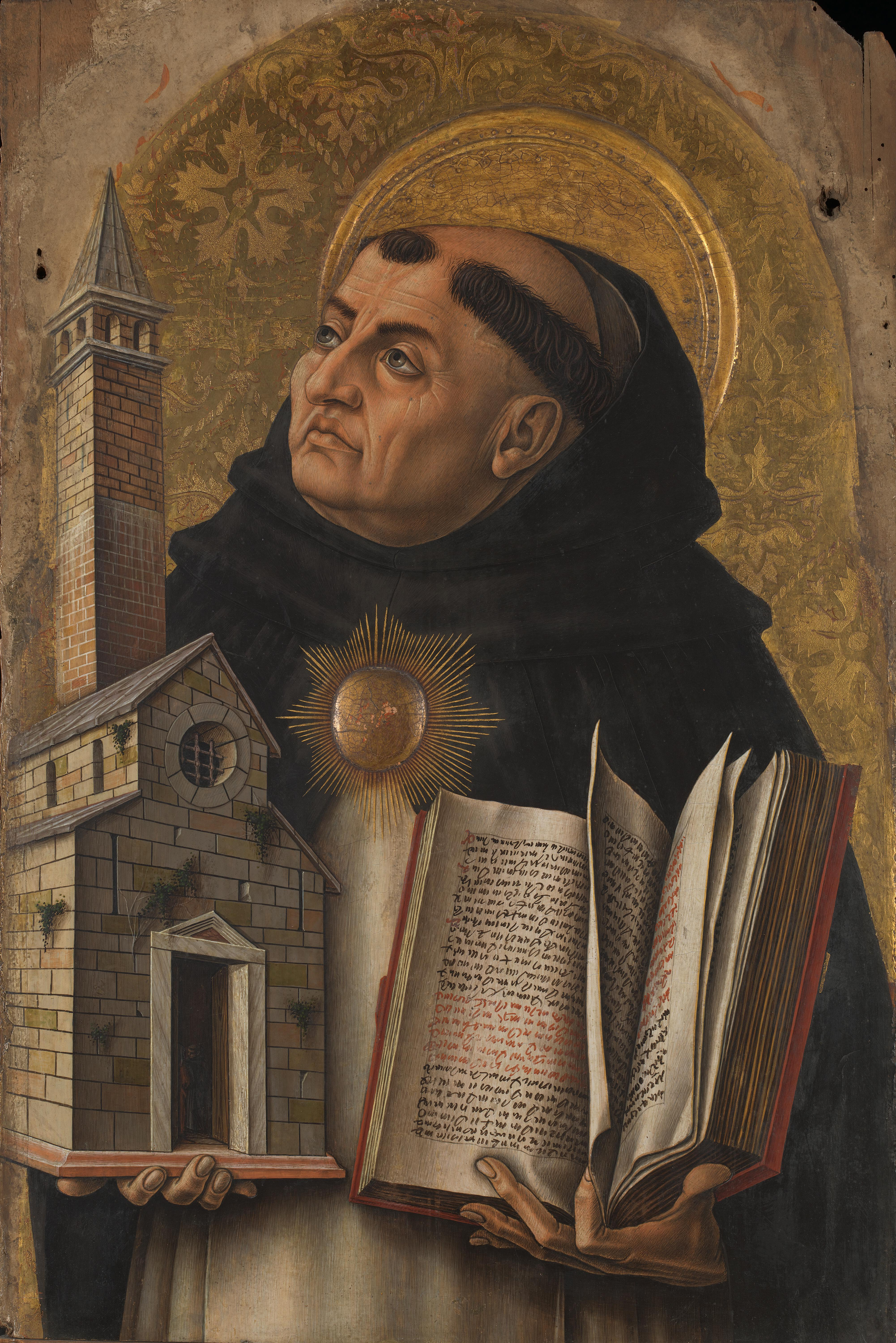
"St Thomas Aquinas" altarpiece in Ascoli Piceno, Italy, by Carlo Crivelli, 15th century

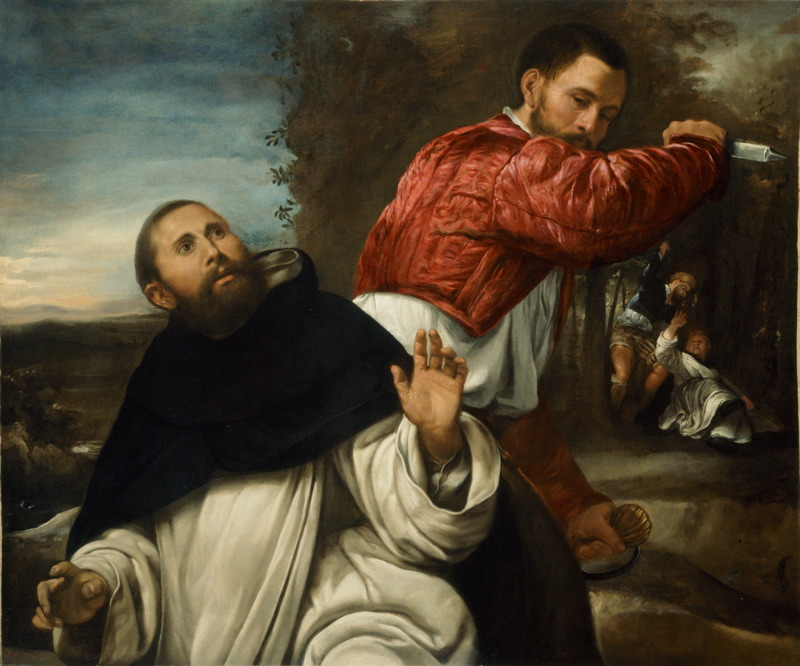
Death of Peter of Verona (1206–1252) by Girolamo Savoldo, ca. 1530–35

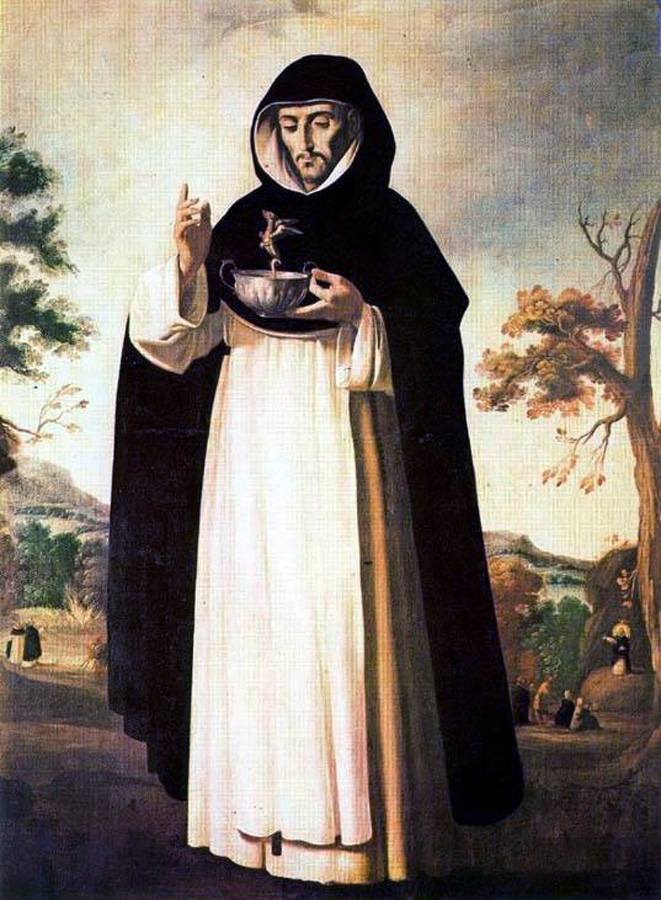
Louis Bertrand (1526–1581), portrait by Francisco de Zurbarán, 1640

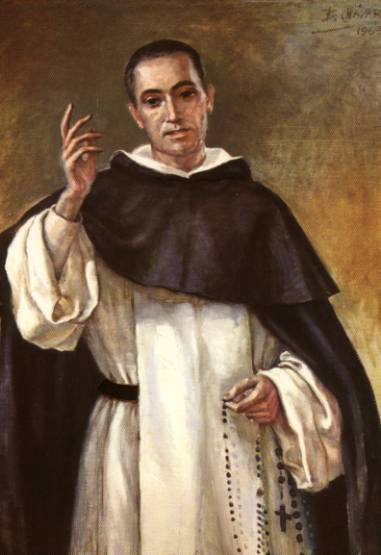
Francisco Coll Guitart (1812–1875)

- Dominic de Guzman (d. 1221)
- Peter Martyr (d. 1252)
- Hyacinth (d. 1257)
- Thomas Aquinas (d. 1274)
- Raymond of Penyafort (d. 1275)
- Albert the Great (d. 1280)
- Vincent Ferrer (d. 1419)
- Antoninus of Florence (d. 1459)
- Pope Pius V (d. 1572)
- Louis Bertrand (d. 1581)
- Bartholomew of Braga (d. 1590)
- John of Cologne (d. 1600)
- Domingo Ibáñez de Erquicia (d. 1633)
- Martin de Porres (d. 1639)
- John Macias (d. 1645)
- Thomasian Martyrs (Asia and Spain, 17th and 18th centuries)
- John Alcober (d. 1748)
- Francisco Coll Guitart (d. 1875)

Numerous Dominicans were included in the canonization of the 117 martyrs of Vietnam and a group of martyrs in Nagasaki.

== Beatified ==
Numerous Dominican friars have been beatified, including:

- Gundisalvus of Amarante (d. 1259), priest and hermit
- Fra Angelico (d. 1455), early Renaissance painter
- Benedict XI, reigned from 1303-04
- Raymond of Capua (d. 1399), twenty-third Master General of the Order of Preachers
- Ceslaus (died c. 1242), provincial superior for Poland and brother of St Hyacinth
- Antonio della Chiesa (d. 1459), priest and religious reformer
- Hyacinthe-Marie Cormier (d. 1916), seventy-sixth Master of the Order of Preachers
- Jan Franciszek Czartoryski (d. 1944), one of the 108 Martyrs of World War II
- John Dominici (d. 1419), Italian cardinal, writer, and reformer
- Giuseppe Girotti (d. 1945), scholar and martyr of World War II
- Peter González (d. 1246), renowned preacher
- Mannes de Guzman (died c. 1235), brother of St Dominic
- Innocent V, reigned in 1276
- Giovanni Liccio (d. 1511)
- Alfonso Navarrete (d. 1617), missionary to Japan, martyr
- Anthony Neyrot (d. 1460), apostate, reconvert, and martyr
- Robert Nutter (d. 1600) English Reformation martyr
- Terence O'Brien (1600 – 30 October 1651) Irish Bishop, reformation martyr
- Peter O'Higgins (d. 1642), Irish reformation martyr
- Reginald of Orleans (d. 1220), also known as Reginald of Saint-Gilles
- Jordan of Pisa (d. 1311), theologian
- Humbert of Romans (d. 1263), fifth Master of the Order of Preachers
- Alanus de Rupe (d. 1475), theologian
- Sadok and 48 Dominican martyrs from Sandomierz (d. 1260), killed by the Golden Horde
- Giles of Santarém (d. 1265), renowned scholar
- Jordan of Saxony (d. 1237), second Master of the Order of Preachers
- Henry Suso (d. 1366), mystic of the German tradition
- Jacobus de Voragine (d. 1298), author of the Golden Legend
- John of Vercelli (d. 1283), sixth Master General of the Order of Preachers
- Thomas of Zumárraga (d. 1622), missionary and martyr of Japan

== Popes and cardinals ==
Four Dominican friars have served as Bishop of Rome:

- Pope Innocent V (r. 1276)
- Pope Benedict XI (r. 1303-04)
- Pope Pius V (r. 1566-72)
- Pope Benedict XIII (r. 1724-30)

There are six Dominican friars in the College of Cardinals:

- Dominik Duka (b. 1943), Czech, Archbishop Emeritus of Prague
- Christoph Schönborn (b. 1945), Austrian, Archbishop of Vienna
- Jose Advincula Jr. (b. 1952), Filipino, Archbishop of Manila
- Jean-Paul Vesco (b. 1962), French, Archbishop of Algiers
- Frank Leo (b. 1971), Canadian, Archbishop of Toronto
- Timothy Radcliffe (b. 1945), British, 85th Master Emeritus of the Order of Preachers

== Others ==
Other notable Dominicans include:

- Matteo Bandello (c. 1480-1562), author of novellas and soldier
- Gabriel Barletta (fl. 15th century), renowned preacher
- Fra Bartolomeo (1472-1517), Italian Renaissance painter
- Conradin of Bornada (d. 1429), renowned preacher
- Vincent of Beauvais (c. 1184–c. 1264), author/compiler of the encyclopedic text The Great Mirror (Speculum Maius)
- Frei Betto (b. 1945), Brazilian friar, theologian, political activist and former government adviser
- Martin Bucer (1491-1551), apostate who left the Order to join the Protestant Reformation
- Meister Eckhart (c. 1260–c. 1328) German mystic and preacher
- Giordano Bruno (1548–1600), philosopher and astronomer condemned as a heretic condemned and burned in Rome
- Edward Ambrose Burgis (c. 1673–1747), historian and theologian
- Elias Bruneti of Bergerac (fl. 13th century), theologian
- Anne Buttimer (1938–2017), University College Dublin
- Thomas Cajetan (1469-1534), theologian, philosopher, and cardinal, who famously debated Martin Luther
- Tommaso Campanella (1568-1639), philosopher, theologian, astrologer, and poet, who was denounced by the Inquisition
- Melchor Cano (1509-1560), Spanish theologian of the School of Salamanca
- Oliviero Carafa (1430-1511), Italian cardinal and diplomat
- Diego Carranza (b. 1559), Mexican missionary
- Bartolomé de las Casas (1484–1566), Spanish bishop in the West, known as the Protector of the Indians
- Marie-Dominique Chenu (1895–1990), French theologian of the Nouvelle Théologie
- Richard Luke Concanen (1747–1810), first Bishop of New York
- Yves Congar (1904–1995), French theologian of the Nouvelle Théologie, later cardinal
- Brian Davies (b. 1951), distinguished Professor of Philosophy, Fordham University; former Regent of Blackfriars, Oxford
- Jeanine Deckers (1933–1985), briefly famous Belgian singer-songwriter
- Nicholas Eymerich (c. 1316-1399), Inquisitor General of the Kingdom of Aragon and theologian
- Anthony Fisher (b. 1960), Archbishop of Sydney
- Réginald Marie Garrigou-Lagrange (1877–1964), leading 20th-century Thomist
- Bernard Gui (1261–1331), French bishop and inquisitor of the Cathars
- Gustavo Gutierrez (b. 1928), Peruvian liberation theologian
- Jean Jérôme Hamer (1916–1996), Belgian theologian and Curia official, cardinal
- Hermann of Minden, 13th century provincial superior of the German province of Dominicans
- Henrik Kalteisen (c. 1390-1464), 24th Archbishop of Nidaros
- Robert Kilwardby (c. 1215-1279), Archbishop of Canterbury and cardinal
- Heinrich Kramer (1430–1505), German author of the Malleus Maleficarum, a handbook for witch hunting
- Jean-Baptiste Henri Lacordaire (1802-1861), French theologian, journalist, and political activist
- James of Lausanne (d. 1321), superior of the Order in France
- Osmund Lewry (1929-1987), English theologian
- Jacques Loew (1908–1999), French worker-priest
- Domingo de Soto (1494-1546), Spanish theologian and philosopher of the School of Salamanca
- John Tauler (c. 1300-1361), one of the Rhineland Mystics
- Johann Tetzel (c. 1465-1519), Inquisitor for Poland and Saxony, renowned preacher and indulgence seller
- Herbert McCabe (1926–2001), English theologian and scholar
- José S. Palma (b. 1950), Archbishop of Cebu
- Teodoro Bacani Jr. (b. 1947), Bishop of Novaliches
- Rufino Sescon Jr. (b. 1972), Bishop of Balanga
- Napoleon Sipalay Jr., (b. 1970), Bishop of Alaminos
- Rodolfo Fontiveros Beltran (1948–2017), Bishop of San Fernando de La Union
- Socrates Villegas (b. 1960), Archbishop of Lingayen-Dagupan
- Malcolm McMahon (b. 1949), Archbishop of Liverpool
- Vincent McNabb (1868–1943), Irish scholar, apologist and ecumenist
- Aidan Nichols (b. 1948), English theologian
- Marco Pellegrini (fl.1500), Vicar-General of the Dominicans in Lombardy
- Dominique Pire (George) (1910–1969), recipient of the Nobel Peace Prize
- Girolamo Savonarola (1452–1498), Italian orator, de facto ruler of Florentine Republic after the overthrow of the Medici family, burned by the Inquisition
- Edward Schillebeeckx (1914–1998), Belgian theologian
- Francisco de Vitoria (c. 1483-1546), Spanish philosopher and theologian of the School of Salamanca, renowned for his work in international law
- Michel-Louis Guérard des Lauriers (1898-1988), French theologian, professor at the Pontifical Lateran University in Rome, advisor of Pope Pius XII on the dogma of the Assumption of Mary, author of the Thesis of Cassiciacum, Sedevacantist bishop
