= Alessandro della Spina =

Alessandro della Spina (born 13th century-died 1313) was a Dominican friar, credited with the invention of spectacles.

== Life ==
Spina was a Dominican friar, in the second half of the 13th century, at the monastery of the Church of Santa Caterina, Pisa. The church's history is known by a manuscript, the Chronica antiqua, a Pisan chronicle of the 14th century. This chronicle portrays him as a modest, intelligent, and mechanically versed copyist and illuminator, "capable of remaking anything he saw".

In 1305, Jordan of Pisa, a friar of the same monastery, was recorded to have spoken of Spina in one of his sermons; lay listeners wrote the sermons down. Jordan declared that glasses were less than 20 years old, and he had known their creator well, but without giving his name.

== Discussion ==
In the 17th century, Carlo Roberto Dati argued Jordan meant Spina. He did not have access to the Chronica antiqua manuscript, but relied on a transcription by his friend Francesco Redi, who had altered the text by modifying or omitting phrases. When Dati died in 1676, Redi published a letter on Spina's invention of spectacles, falsifying both the Chronica antiqua and Jordan's sermon.

In the 17th century, people wanted to give a name and country to the inventor of glasses. Out of parochialism, people wanted it to be a fellow citizen of their town.

Around the same time, Ferdinando Leopoldo Del Migliore wrote that Spina was a Florentine. In 1684, he too made forgeries to attribute the invention of spectacles to fellow Florentine Salvino D'Armati. The myth of Salvino, the inventor of glasses, was transmitted until the 20th century. It was not until 1920 that the manufacture of this fake was revealed by the philologist Isidoro del Lungo.

In 1956, historian Edward Rosen published a detailed history of deliberate forgeries or unintentional errors in the invention of eyeglasses, passed down from author to author, since the 17th century. According to Rosen, Allessandro della Spina was indeed a friar in Pisa, but he was not a native of that city.
