= Edward Ambrose Burgis =

English Dominican historian and theologian

Edward Ambrose Burgis was an English Dominican historian and theologian.

== Biography ==
He was born in England c.1673. When a young man he left the Church of England, of which his father was a minister, and became a Catholic, joining the Dominican Order at Rome, where he passed his noviceship in the convent of Saints John and Paul on the Caelian Hill, then occupied by the English Dominicans. After his religious profession (1696) he was sent to Naples to the Dominican school of St. Thomas, where he displayed unusual mental ability.

Upon the completion of his studies he was sent to the Flemish university of Louvain, where for nearly thirty years he taught philosophy, theology, Sacred Scripture and church history in the College of St. Thomas, established in 1697 for the Dominicans of England through the bequest of Cardinal Thomas Howard, O.P. He was the rector of the college from 1715 to 1720 and again from 1724 to 1730. In the latter year he was elected to the office of provincial superior; in 1741 he became Prior of the English Dominican convent at Bornhem, and in 1746 he was appointed Vicar general of the English Dominicans in Belgium. He died in Brussels on 27 April 1747.

== Works ==
He published a number of pamphlets of considerable merit containing theses written in Latin on Scriptural, theological and historical subjects. It was as a writer of English that he excelled, especially along historical lines; his style is easy and pleasing, and he is accurate in his statements.

In 1712 he published in London "The Annals of the Church", a volume embracing the period from A.D. 34 to 300. As stated in the preface it was his intention to bring the annals down to his own time in a work of nine volumes, but he abandoned this plan, rewrote the first period and published "The Annals of the Church from the Death of Christ", in five octavo volumes (London, 1738), the first work of the kind written in English by Catholic or Protestant.

The book entitled "An Introduction to the Catholic Faith", by Thomas Worthington, O.P. (London, 1709), was completed by Burgis, although his name does not appear in connection with it.
