= Simon of Cascia =

Blessed Simon of Cascia
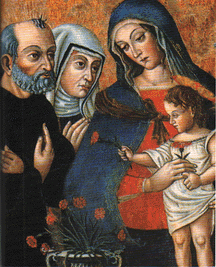
- Simon of Cascia and Rita of Cascia (Madonna of liberation), by Pier Paolo Agabiti

Ascetic
- Born: c. 1295; Cascia, Italy
- Died: 2 February 1348; Florence, Italy
- Venerated in: Roman Catholic Church
- Beatified: 1833 by Pope Gregory XVI
- Feast: 16 February

Simon of Cascia (or Simeone Fidati) (c. 1295–1348) was an ascetic and preacher from Cascia, Italy. In his early days, he was influenced by the Spiritual Franciscan Angelo Clareno da Cingoli. He is commemorated on February 16.

== Life and career ==
Simon was born in Cascia, Italy, around 1295, of the distinguished Fidati family. His initial studies were in the natural sciences, which he later gave up for theology and scripture. He entered the Order of Augustinian Hermits at about the age of twenty. It was probably during the time when Simon was completing his theological and philosophical training in accordance with the Order’s programme of study that he encountered the Franciscan divine Angelo da Clareno. This encounter shaped his life thereafter (this was his so-called ‘conversion experience’).

From then on, Simon’s main interest centred not on the scientiae saeculares, which formed part of the training, but on the gospel, on preaching, and on the cure of souls. Although Simon studied the Scriptures as well as patristic, monastic, martyrological, and hagiographic works intensively throughout his life, as a simplex frater he renounced holding any academic title or any position of authority within the Order. He worked instead in the churches and convents of the Order, particularly in Rome, Florence, Pisa, Perugia, Siena, Gubbio, and Foligno, as an itinerant preacher and as a counsellor who was held in esteem by both clerics and lay including figures like Tommaso Corsini, Giovanni delle Celle, and Taddeo Gaddi. His model of austerity and strict penances brought him more followers. He was a gifted spiritual advisor and confessor, and spent many nights writing letters to those seeking his guidance.

His desire for a spiritual life of study, prayer and solitude caused him to reject all episcopal appointments. He often sought council from the Benedictine Camaldolese monk, Bl Silvester of Valdiseve.

He wrote in both Latin and vernacular Italian. The origin and influence of his writings have sparked some debate among scholars, both literary and theological. His most significant writing, The Works of Our Savior (De Gestis Domini Salvatoris), was read widely during the Middle Ages, and is believed to have influenced the 16th century reformer Martin Luther.

He also worked to reform those involved in prostitution, converting many and founding a "house of penance" for them. In Florence, he founded a woman's convent, and a refuge for unmarried mothers.

Simon died in Florence on February 2, 1348, during the Great Plague. His remains are preserved in Cascia at the Basilica of St. Rita. He was beatified by Pope Gregory XVI in 1833.

== Works ==
Simon’s main work is a Gospel commentary comprising fifteen books, De gestis Domini salvatoris, which he composed between 1338 and 1347 at the urging of Tommaso Corsini in Rome. His treatise L’ordine della vita Cristiana, written earlier in Florence in 1333, is reckoned to be the first catechism for adults in the Italian vernacular (Volgare). In addition to these works, he left behind an abundant corpus of letters, some in Latin, some in Italian, as well as a number of devotional verses (laude) in the style of Jacopone da Todi. His Vita was written by the Augustinian Hermit Giovanni of Salerno under the title Tractatus de vita et moribus fratris Simonis de Cassia.

Simon's work is strongly marked by Augustinian thinking. This is particularly apparent in his conception of the relationship between God and human person, grace, the cross, redemption, the Church, and the Christian way of life. This Augustinian spirituality also connects Simon with elements of Franciscan spirituality, with which he became familiar during his preaching activity in Umbria, and with which he strongly sympathized through his close contact with Angelo Clareno. His emphasis on the ideal of poverty (paupertas) can be attributed to this.

== List of works ==
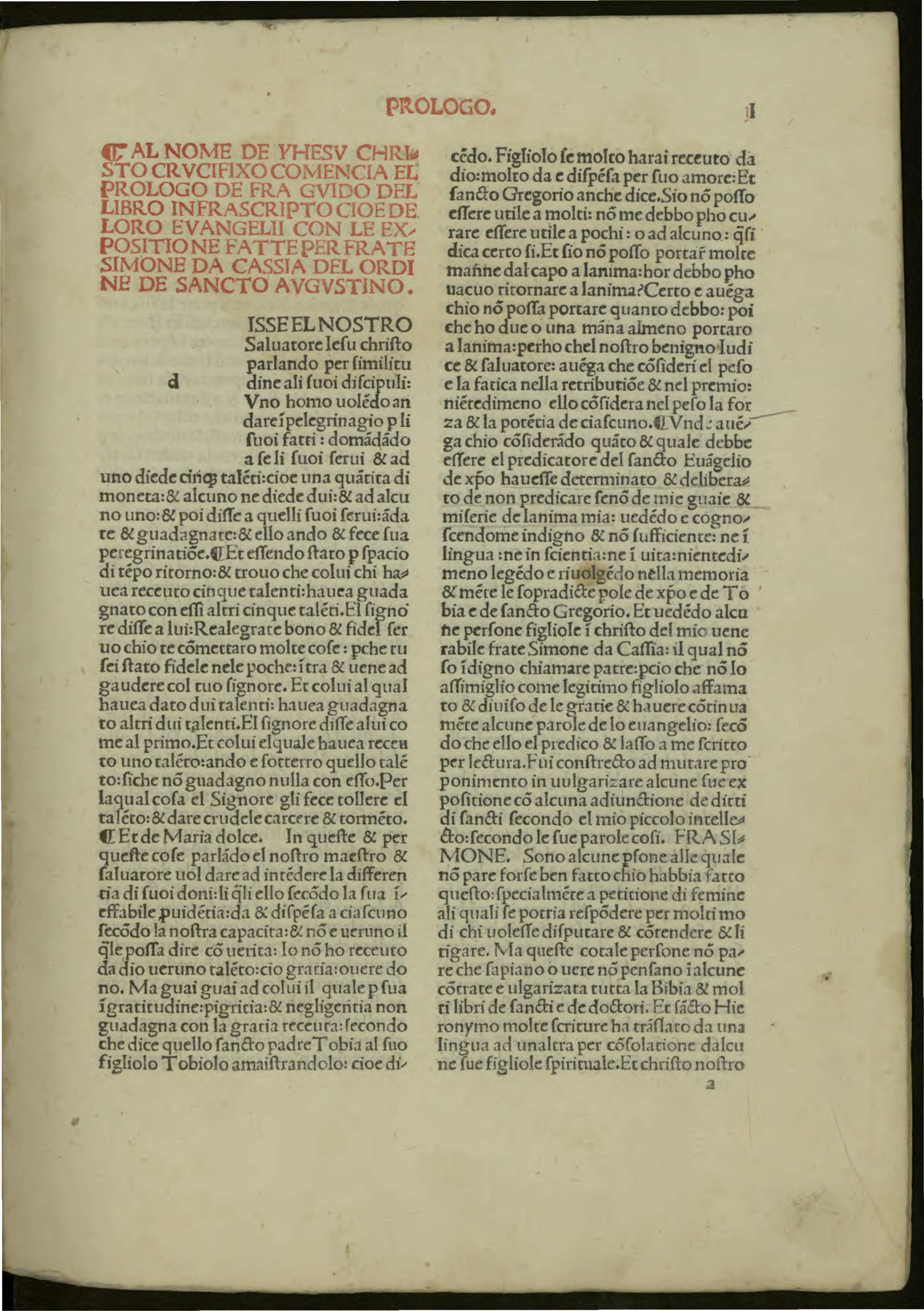
Expositio super totum corpus Evangeliorum, 1486

=== Published ===
- De gestis Christis
- Expositio super evangelia
- De beata Virgine

=== Unpublished ===
- De cognitione peccati
- Expositio symboli
- De speculo crucis
- De conflictu christiano
- De vita christiana
- De doctrina christiana
