= Jordan of Pisa =

Italian theologian (c. 1255–1311)

Blessed Jordan of Pisa OP

Priest
- Born: c 1255; Pisa, Italy
- Died: 19 August 1311; Piacenza, Italy
- Venerated in: Roman Catholic Church (Dominican Order)
- Beatified: 23 August 1833, Saint Peter's Basilica, Papal States by Pope Gregory XVI

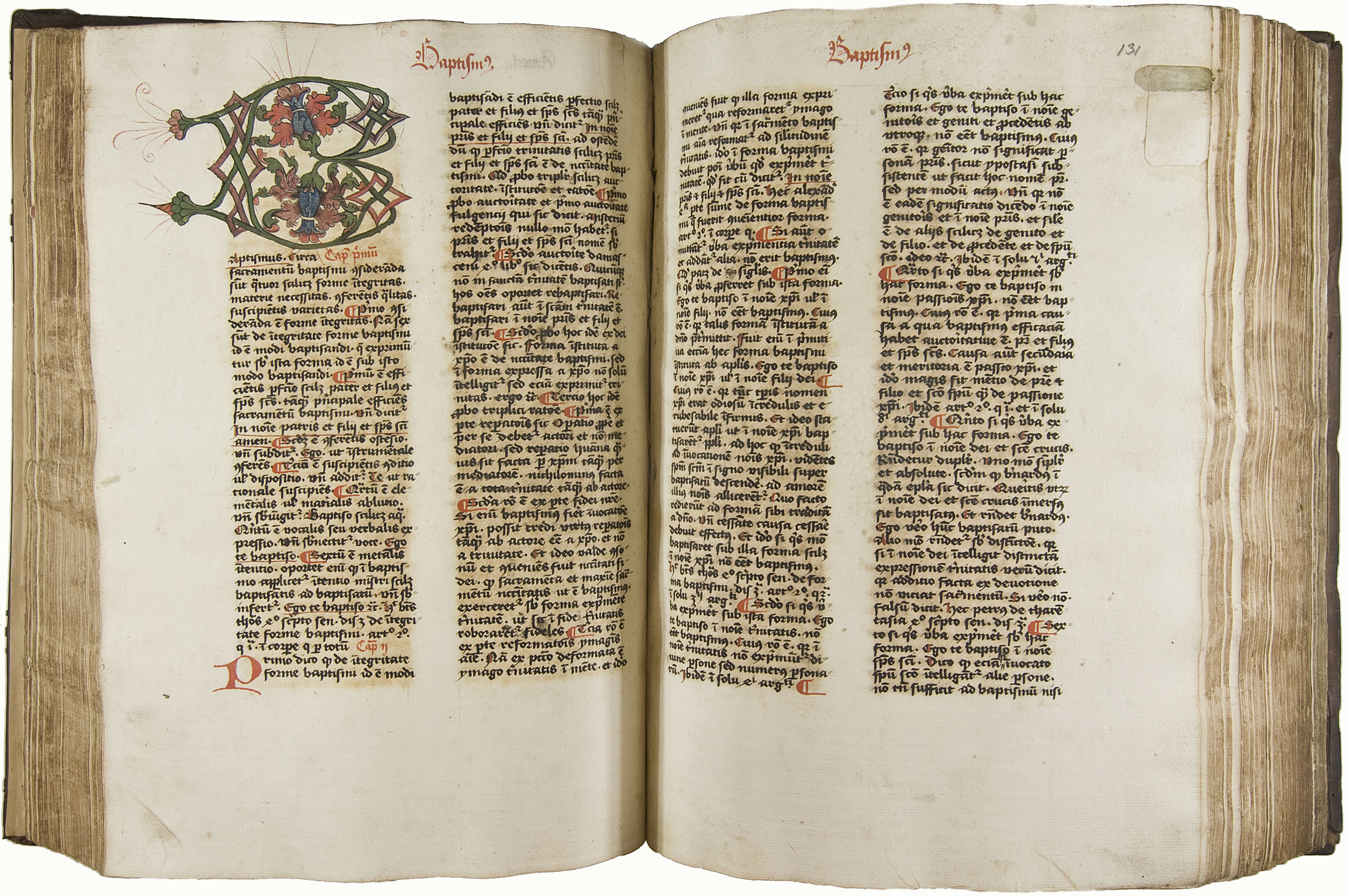
Giordano's Pantheologia (written early 14th c, this manuscript from 1470)

Jordan of Pisa (Italian: Giordano da Pisa), also called Jordan of Rivalto (Italian: Giordano da Rivalto; c. 1255 – 19 August 1311), was a Dominican theologian and the first preacher whose vernacular Italian sermons are preserved. His cultus was confirmed on 23 August 1833 by Pope Gregory XVI and he was beatified in 1838; his day is either March 6 or August 19. His relics are in the church of Santa Caterina in Pisa.

== Life ==
Jordan was born in the mid thirteenth century at Pisa. He was educated at Pisa and then Paris in the late 1270s, where he received his bachelor's in theology. He went on to join the Dominican house there in 1280. He returned to Pisa in 1280, where he lived as one of the brothers at the convent of Santa Caterina. At Pisa he founded the Confraternity of the Holy Redeemer, whose constitution survives, and several others.

Jordan continued his studies at the University of Bologna and lived in Paris from 1285 to 1288, before returning to Pisa. He preached and taught variously at Siena, Viterbo, and Perugia before eventually moving to Florence, in which area he was a widely respected preacher, eventually being appointed by the provincial chapter at Rieti as a lector in the church of Santa Maria Novella in 1305. He held that post for the next three years, and contributed greatly to its esteem. In 1301, he attended a general meeting of the order held in Cologne, Germany.

Jordan was renowned for his knowledge, especially of the breviary, missal, the Bible, and its marginal notes, and the second half of the Summa Theologiae, all of which he had memorised, according to the chronicle of the Dominican convent of Pisa.

Jordan studied the use of preaching for evangelisation. Following a new custom just coming then into vogue, he preached in the vernacular. His Tuscan was reputedly versatile and musical, but never elaborate or ornate.

At Florence he would reportedly preach five times a day, walking about, both indoors and out, followed by a crowd of listeners as he developed his topic. During his lengthy sermons his friend and disciple, Silvester of Valdiseve, sometimes sat near the pulpit with wine to refresh him. Some of his listeners took notes that have survived. His preaching was said to have a positive effect on Florentine public life and morality by its emphasis on sound Thomistic doctrine, Christian living, and perseverance.

In 1311 the Master General Aymericus Giliani appointed him professor of theology at the friary of Saint James in Paris, to deliver his reading of the Lombard's Sentences and obtain his master's degree, but he died at Piacenza on the journey.

== Bibliography ==
- Delcorno, Carlo (2000). "GIORDANO da Pisa". Dizionario Biografico degli Italiani (in Italian). Vol. 55: Ginammi–Giovanni da Crema. Rome: Institute of the Italian Encyclopaedia. ISBN 978-88-12-00032-6.
- Smalley, Beryl. Review of Carlo Delcorno, Giordano da Pisa e l'antica predicazione volgare (Florence: Olschki, 1975). The English Historical Review, 91:359 (1976), pp. 412–413.
- John Cumming, ed. Butler's Lives of the Saints, VIII: August. Continuum International Publishing Group, 1998. ISBN 0-86012-257-3.
- Blessed Jordan of Pisa at Patron Saints Index
