= Blessed Imelda's School =

- 臺北市天主教靜修高級中學

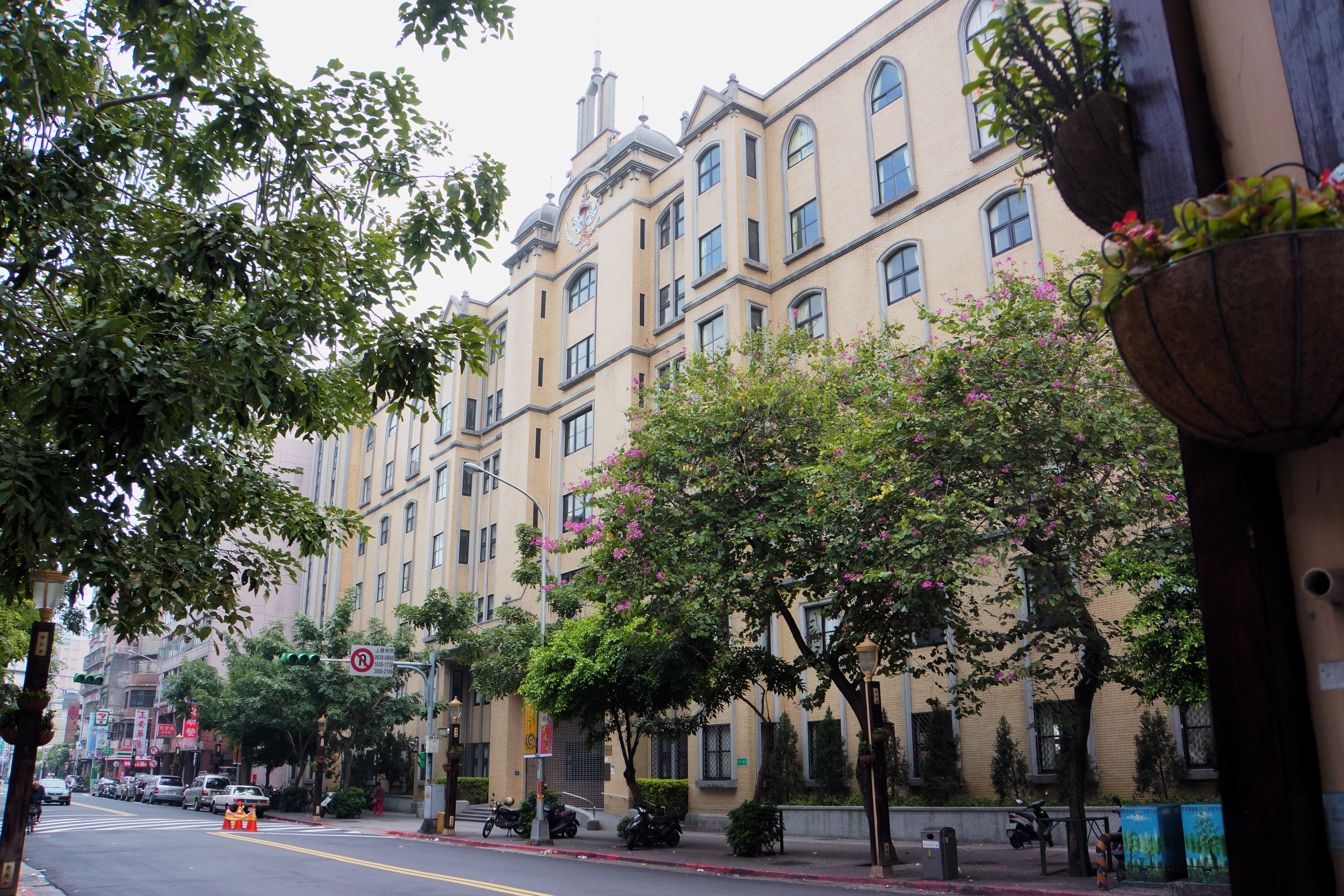

Location
- No. 59, Ningxia Road, Datong District; Taipei City; Taiwan
- Coordinates: 25°3′29″N 121°30′56″E

Information
- Type: Parochial secondary school
- Motto: Latin: Veritas (Truth)
- Religious affiliation: Catholicism
- Denomination: Dominican Order
- Patron saint: Imelda Lambertini
- Established: 16 April 1917; 109 years ago
- Principal: Tsai Ying-Hua
- Grades: 7-12
- Website: www.bish.tp.edu.tw

Blessed Imelda's School is a private Catholic secondary school, located in Taipei, Taiwan. Established in 1916 by the Dominican sisters, it is the oldest Catholic school in Taiwan. The school is named in honour of Blessed Imelda Lambertini, a 14th century Dominican sister.

== History ==
Blessed Imelda's girls' school opened on April 16, 1917, with financial support from the Apostolic Prefect of Taiwan and from the Holy Rosary Dominican Province. It was established when Taiwan was under Japanese rule, and Japanese culture has influenced its development. It began with five Dominican sisters on the teaching staff along with Japanese teachers. Music, painting, handicraft, and English were taught. It had one junior high school and one senior high school class and 158 students, of whom three quarters were ethnic Japanese.

In 1934 the school extended its program to three years. During World War II the president of the school was appointed by the Japanese but the Dominican Sisters continued to run the school. It was the only private school running during the Japanese occupation. In 1935 the enrollment was 740 with a staff of 22. It enrolled 120 of 652 applicants in 1942.

In 2007, boys were allowed into the middle school division. They were allowed into the high school division in 2018.

== Notable alumnae ==
=== Actresses ===
- Chang Hsiao-yen - television host and actress
- Ruby Lin - known for My Fair Princess
- Fon Cin - known for Taiwan Tornado

=== Other ===
- Lien Fang Yu - former Second Lady
