= Order of the Blessed Sacrament =

The Order of the Blessed Sacrament is an enclosed congregation and a reform of the Dominican Order devoted to the perpetual adoration of the Blessed Sacrament.

== History ==
The congregation was founded by Anthony Le Quieu, a French Dominican priest. Born in 1601 in Paris, le Quieu entered the Order of Friars Preachers in the Rue St. Honoré in 1622. He became master of novices first in his own monastery and later at Avignon (1634).

While in Avignon (1639), he laid the foundation for an order of cloistered nuns. Twenty years later, in 1659, le Quieu founded the first house in Marseille with three women whom he had trained in Avignon. The Bishop of Marseille recognized the rules and constitution drawn up by le Quieu, and they became a simple congregation. Le Quieu opened another house in Bollène. Pope Innocent XII (1693) recognized the constitution, authorized the nuns to take solemn vows, and bound them to enclosure, after the death of Le Quieu.

This was the first congregation instituted for the perpetual adoration of the Blessed Sacrament;

The original mother-house in Marseille was suppressed at the French Revolution, and the nuns were dispersed, but it reopened in 1816. The Bollène houses fared worse. Thirteen nuns were martyred under the Commune. The remainder of the Bollène community returned to their convent and resumed their work of perpetual adoration in 1802.

The Bollene convent sent three nuns and one lay sister under Emilie Pellier to England to found a house at Cannington (1863). This community moved to Taunton in Somersetshire, where it remains. There is also a house in Oxford, and another near Newport.

After le Quieu's death, congregations were created in France. After the French Revolution, additional houses were founded. Since then, a congregation was established in Normandy and Halle in Belgium.
