= Colegio Lacordaire =

Dominican Catholic school in Valle del Cauca, Colombia

Coordinates: 3°22′39.05″N 76°32′35.58″W

- Calle 5, Cali, Valle del Cauca; Colombia

Information
- Type: Dominican, Catholic
- Established: 1956; 70 years ago
- Rector: Willyam Gómez Ramírez, OP
- Gender: Coeducational
- Age range: 2 through 17
- Website: Lacordaire

Colegio Lacordaire is a school in Cali, Colombia, that was established in 1956 by the Dominicans. It currently has offerings from infancy through grade eleven, with a special emphasis on English to prepare students to study abroad.

== History ==
On March 18, 2016, the University of Cambridge accredited Lacordaire to grant certification for proficiency levels in English. The school also has agreements whereby its eleventh grade students may receive credits in colleges and universities abroad.
