= Simon Henton =

Simon Henton or Heinton (Note: Also called Simonis de Hentona (or Harneton), Simonem de Hentone, Symonis de Heintun, and Simon Hentonus (alias Herneton or Hareton)) (fl. c. 1248–1262) was a Dominican provincial in England and a biblical commentator. Most of his works are lost.

== Biography ==
Born at Henton, near Winchester, he became a Dominican friar, and eventually provincial of the order in England. He wrote commentaries on the books of Proverbs, Song of Songs, Wisdom, Sirach, the four greater prophets, and Job, besides treatises on the Ten Commandments, the Articles of the Faith, and the Cross of Christ. All these works have perished. The treatise on the Articles of the Faith and the commentary on Job were once in the library at St. Paul's. Henton's Moralia or Postillæ on the twelve minor prophets are preserved in New College MS. 45. Bernard mentions a manuscript which contains 'excerpta ex summa Fratris Symonis de Heintun'.

== Sources ==
- Coxe, H. O. (1852). "Collegii Novi". Catalogus Codicum MSS. qui in Collegiis Aulisque Oxoniensibus. Vol. 1. Oxford University Press. pp. 12, 13.
- Dugdale, William (1658). The History of St. Pauls Cathedral in London. Tho. Warren. pp. 277, 282.
- Tugwell, Simon (2004). "Hinton [Henton], Simon of (fl. c. 1248–1262), Dominican theologian". Oxford Dictionary of National Biography (online ed.). Oxford University Press. doi:10.1093/ref:odnb/12995. (Subscription, Wikipedia Library access or UK public library membership required.)

Attribution:

- This article incorporates text from a publication now in the public domain: Kingsford, Charles Lethbridge (1891). "Henton, Simon". In Stephen, Leslie; Lee, Sidney (eds.). Dictionary of National Biography. Vol. 26. London: Smith, Elder & Co. p. 139.
