= Marco Pellegrini =

Marco Pellegrini (fl. ca. 1500) was a Dominican friar and Vicar-General of the Dominicans in Lombardy from October 1506. As a novice he took part in the Coppini Mission to England. He was noted for his opposition to the doctrines of Savonarola and as Vicar-General implemented stern measures to stamp them out in religious houses.
