= James of Lausanne =

James of Lausanne (died 1321) was the superior of the Dominican order in France from 1318 until his death in 1321.

Nothing is known of James's life before his entrance into the Dominican priory at Lausanne in Switzerland and his assignment to theological studies in Paris in 1303. James earned his master's degree in theology in 1317 and was elected superior of the Dominican Province of France in 1318, a position he held until his death in 1321. In the course of his short academic career, James authored commentaries on multiple books of the Old and New Testaments and produced some 1,500 sermons. His oeuvre has yet to be critically edited, although numerous manuscripts and several early modern printed editions are still extant. James was a disciple of Peter Paludanus and wrote on original sin, arguing against Durandus of Saint-Pourçain that original sin was privation of original justice.
