= Conradin of Bornada =

Italian Dominican preacher

Conradin of Bornada (or Conradin of Brescia) (died 1 November 1429) was an Italian Dominican preacher. His early biographers generally refer to him as Blessed.

== Biography ==
His parents, noble and wealthy Brescians, were devoted adherents of the Catholic Church during the Western Schism. They gave their son a careful education and sent him, at the age of sixteen, to study civil and canon law at the University of Padua.

He entered the Dominican Order at Padua in 1419, and was speedily found to be a model of religious observance. After his ordination his zeal found fruitful expression in his eloquent preaching. He was made prior of Brescia and shortly afterwards, by appointment of the master general, prior of the convent of St. Dominic at Bologna, where he was to restore strict observance.

Amid political upheavals, when Bologna under the influence of the Bentivoglio family had revolted against papal authority, Conradin took a firm stand against them. For publishing the papal interdict, which they had incurred but which they had disregarded, he was twice seized and imprisoned. Pope Martin V, in recognition of his services, sought to create him a cardinal, but he declined.

Conradin died at Bologna in 1429 during a plague.
