= Diego Carranza =

16th-century Dominican missionary in New Spain

Diego Carranza (born in Mexico, 1559; died at Tehuantepec, date unknown) was a Dominican missionary in New Spain.

== Life ==
Carranza entered the Dominican Order on 12 May 1577, and was sent to Nejapa in Oaxaca after being ordained a priest. He was assigned to the mission among the forest-dwelling Oaxaca Chontal people.

Despite resistance from the Chontal, who were uninterested in conversion to Christianity, Carranza was partly successful in his efforts to settle them in villages, baptize them, and convince them to dress in European clothing. Among the villages in which Carranza erected churches was Santa María Texcatitlán.

For twelve years Carranza led an exposed life, and contracted leprosy. He must have died quite young, but the exact date is unknown.

== Works ==
He composed, in the Chontal language, a "Doctrina cristiana", "Exercicios espirituales", and "Sermones". They remained in manuscript, and were later lost.

In 1580, Carranza published grammatical studies on Chontal.
