= Hermann of Minden =

Hermann of Minden was a Provincial superior of the German province of Dominicans in the 13th century.
