= Silvester of Valdiseve =

Italian medieval monk

Silvester of Valdiseve (or Valdisieve) (1278–1348) was a medieval monk. He has been beatified by the Roman Catholic Church. Silvester was christened Ventura and lived in Florence. He was involved in the processing of wool (carding and bleaching) until the age of 40 when he became a monk. He entered the Camaldolese monastery of Santa Maria degli Angeli, also located in Florence. There, he worked as a cook.

Although unable to read, Silvester thought deeply on theological subjects and was consulted by scholars and monks alike, including the prior. He was also sought for counsel by the Augustinian friar Simon of Cascia. Silvester also opposed overly harsh penitence by monks. He died at the age of 70.

== Sources ==
- Butler, Jones and Burns. Butler's Lives of the Saints. p. 80.
- Delaney, John A. "Dictionary of Saints". p. 582
