= Gabriel Barletta =

Italian Catholic Dominican preacher of the 15th century

Gabriel Barletta or Gabriele da Barletta (Barletta, Italy, 15th century) was a Catholic preacher of the Dominican Order, whose sermons were widely published in Italy after his death.

== Sermons ==
Used across Italy, Barletta's sermons became synonymous with preaching: Nescit praedicare qui nescit barlettare (He who knows how to preach, knows how to "Barletta").

In form his sermons are nothing else than the ordinary homily on the virtues and vices of life. He spares none of the foibles and weaknesses of his contemporaries, and in his denunciations one often meets with passages of eloquent and biting sarcasm. At times he descends to an almost burlesque mimicry, as witness his sermon on the manner in which the rich ecclesiastic says the Lord's Prayer. Pierre Bayle and Théophile Raynaud criticize some of Barletta's sermons for coarse language; Dominic Casales defends them in Candor lilii seu Ordo Praedicatorum a calumniis Petri a Valle Clausa [i.e. Theop. Reynaldi] vindicatus.

Scholars disagree on whether Barletta was actually the author of the sermons attributed to him (see Tubing, Quartalschrift, 1872, II, 270), although most accept them as authentic. Leandro Alberti, in his 1550 Descrizzione di tutta Italia, says that an unskilled youth whom he knew gathered together old and unknown sermons and ascribed them to Barletta.

== Works ==
Barletta's sermons appeared in two volumes at Brixen in 1497, and have been reprinted very frequently since. Jacques Échard says that no less than thirteen editions appeared in eighty years. The best edition is that of Venice (1577), in two volumes. While originally given in the vernacular, they survive only in Latin.

His best works:

- Sermones quadragesimales et de sanctis (Holy Lenten Sermons)
- Tabula super Bibliam (Overview of the Bible)
- Votum de libro De divina praeordinatione vitae et mortis humanae (An Invocation of the Book: On the Divine Predetermination of Human Life and Death)
