= Elias Bruneti of Bergerac =

Medieval French theologian

Elias Bruneti of Bergerac (Elias Bruneti de Brageriaco) was a Dominican master of theology in the 13th century. According to Kaeppeli, he lectured in Montpellier in the years 1246 through 1247. Later, he became the regent master of the Dominicans in Paris around the years 1248–1256.
