= Nović =

Nović is a surname. Notable people with the surname include:

- Darko Nović, football coach and manager
- Joksim Nović-Otočanin, Serbian adventurer, freedom fighter, writer, and poet
- Sara Nović, American writer, translator, and creative writing professor, as well as a deaf rights' activist
- Sredoje Nović, Bosnian Serb politician
