= Dominican Order =

Catholic mendicant order

Order of Preachers
- Ordo Prædicatorum
- Coat of arms of the order
- Abbreviation: OP
- Formation: 1206 (for women); 1215 (for men); December 22, 1216 (of pontifical right)
- Founder: Dominic de Guzmán
- Founded at: Prouille, France (for women); Toulouse, France (for men)
- Headquarters: Convento Santa Sabina, Rome, Italy
- Members: 5,369 (including 4,073 priests) (2024)
- Master: Gerard Francisco Timoner III
- Parent organization: Catholic Church
- Website: op.org

The Order of Preachers (Latin: Ordo Prædicatorum, abbreviated OP), commonly known as the Dominican Order, is a Catholic mendicant order of pontifical right that was founded in France by the Castilian priest Dominic de Guzmán. It was approved by Pope Honorius III via the papal bull Religiosam vitam on 22 December 1216. Members of the order, who are referred to as Dominicans, generally display the letters OP after their names, standing for Ordo Praedicatorum, meaning of "the Order of Preachers". Membership in the order includes friars, (Note: The word friar is etymologically related to the word for brother in Latin.) nuns, active sisters, and lay or secular Dominicans, formerly known as tertiaries. More recently, there have been a growing number of associates of the religious sisters who are unrelated to the tertiaries.

Founded to preach the gospel and to oppose heresy, the teaching activity of the order and its scholastic organisation placed it at the forefront of the intellectual life of the Middle Ages. The order is known for its intellectual tradition and for having produced many theologians and philosophers. In 2024, there were 5,369 Dominican friars, including 4,073 priests. The order is headed by the master of the order who, as of 2022, is Gerard Timoner III. The Blessed Virgin Mary, Mary Magdalene, Augustine of Hippo and Francis of Assisi are the Principal Patrons of the order.

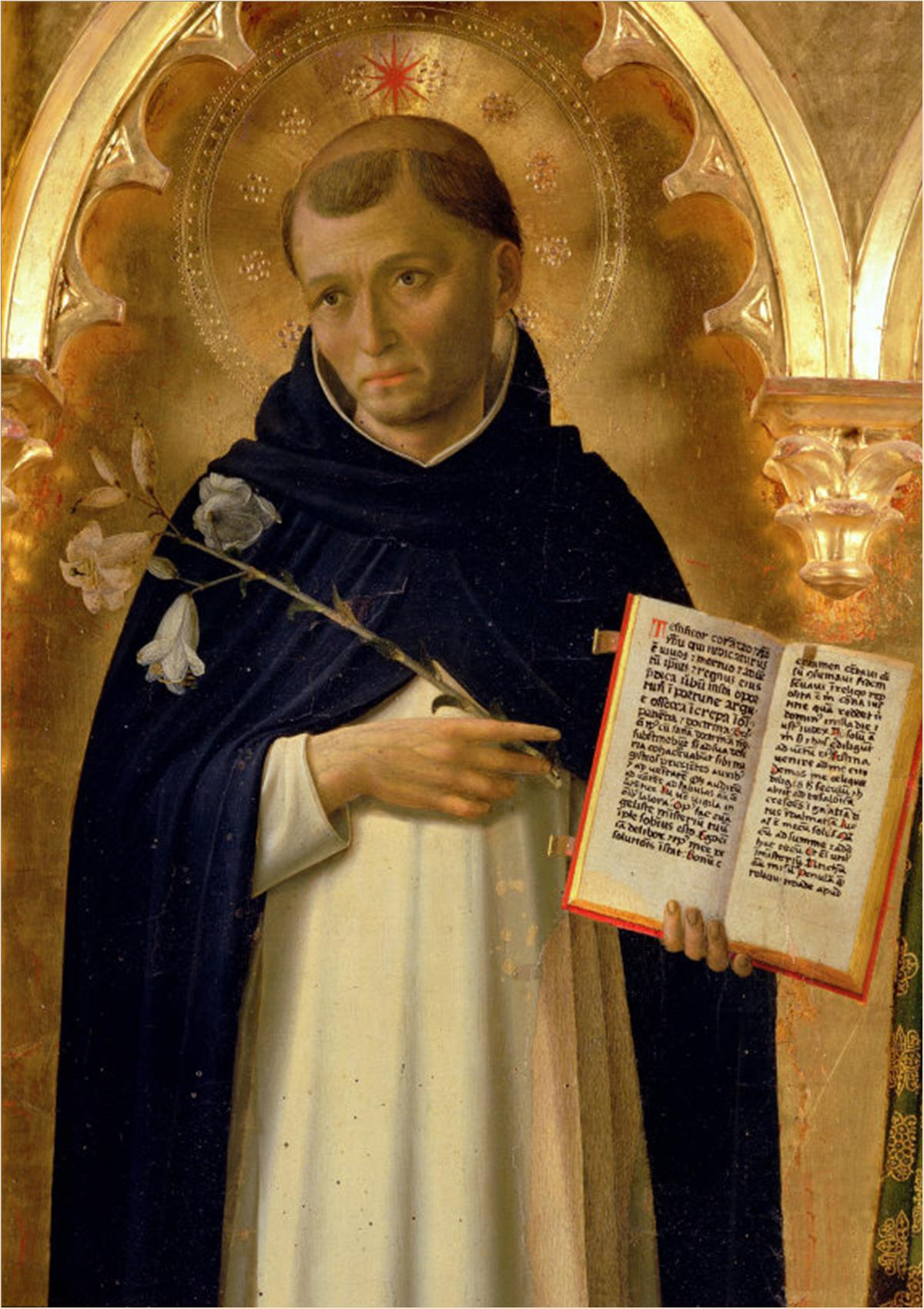
Saint Dominic, portrayed in the Perugia Altarpiece by Fra Angelico, Galleria Nazionale dell'Umbria, Perugia

== Foundation ==
The Dominican Order was established during the Middle Ages at a time when men of God were no longer expected to stay behind the walls of a cloister. Instead, they travelled among the people, taking as their examples the apostles of the primitive Church. Out of this ideal emerged two orders of mendicant friars - one, the Friars Minor, led by Francis of Assisi; the other, the Friars Preachers, led by Dominic de Guzmán. Like his contemporary, Francis, Dominic saw the need for a new type of organization, and the quick growth of the Dominicans and Franciscans during their first century of existence confirms that conditions were favorable for the growth of the orders of mendicant friars. The Dominicans and other mendicant orders may have been an adaptation to the rise of the profit economy in medieval Europe.

Dominic sought to establish a new kind of order, one that would bring the dedication and systematic education of the older monastic orders like the Benedictines to bear on the religious problems of the burgeoning population of cities, but with more organizational flexibility than either monastic orders or the secular clergy. In 1216, Pope Honorius III gave permission for the establishment of the Order of Preachers, in support of Dominic's preaching against heresies. The new order was to be trained to preach in the vernacular languages in order to more effectively combat heresies that were spread via preaching in local languages such as Catharism.

Dominic inspired his followers with loyalty to learning and virtue, a deep recognition of the spiritual power of worldly deprivation and the religious state, and a highly developed governmental structure. At the same time, Dominic inspired the members of his order to develop a "mixed" spirituality. They were both active in preaching, and contemplative in study, prayer and meditation. The brethren of the Dominican Order were urbane and learned, as well as contemplative and mystical in their spirituality. While these traits affected the women of the order, the nuns especially absorbed the latter characteristics and made those characteristics their own. In England, the Dominican nuns blended these elements with the defining characteristics of English Dominican spirituality and created a spirituality and collective personality that set them apart.

=== Dominic de Guzmán ===
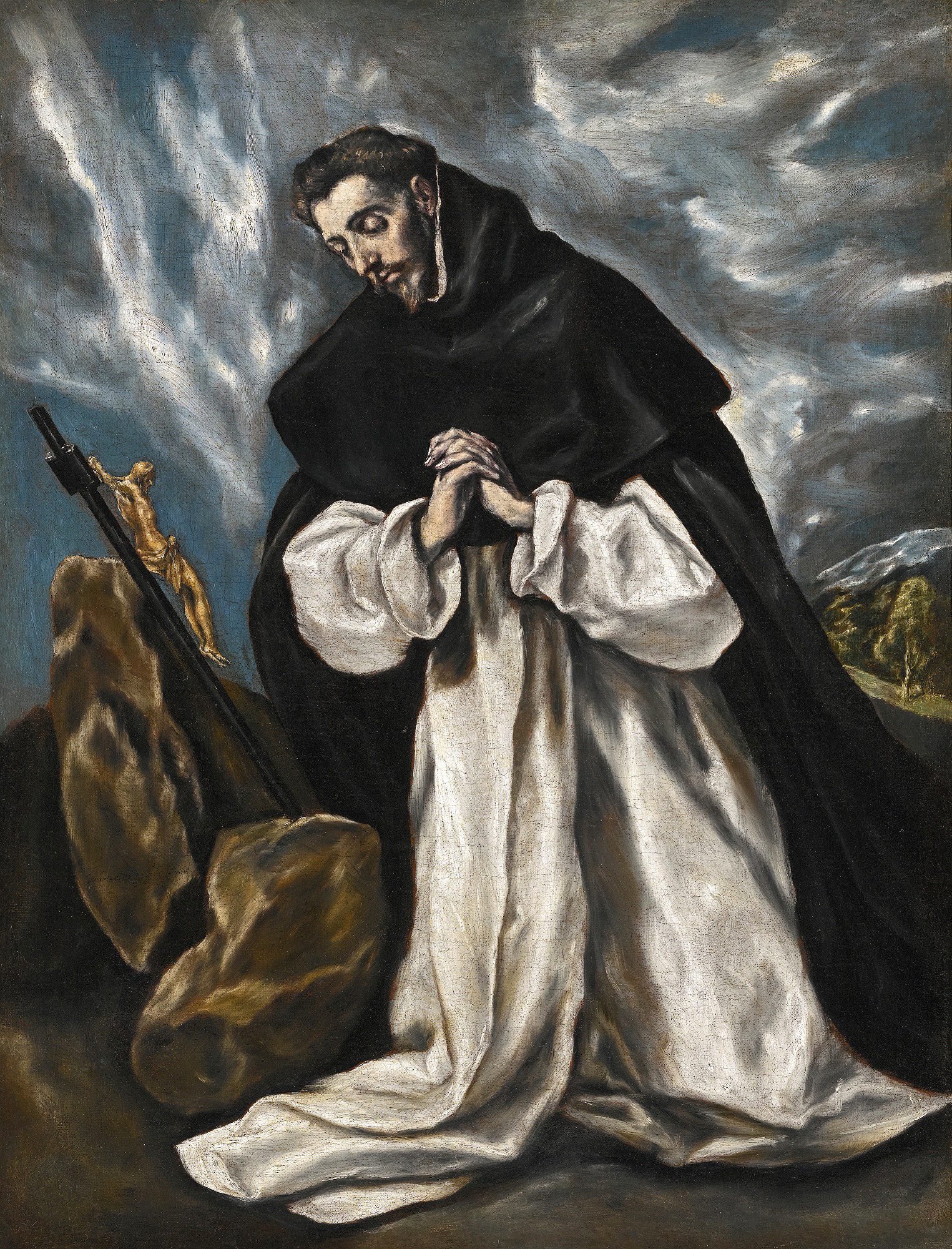
Saint Dominic (1170–1221), portrait by El Greco, about 1600

As an adolescent, Dominic de Guzmán had a particular love of theology, and the Scriptures became the foundation of his spirituality. During his studies in Palencia, Spain, there was a dreadful famine, prompting Dominic to sell all of his beloved books and other equipment to help his neighbours. He was made a canon and ordained to the priesthood in the monastery of Santa María de La Vid. After completing his studies, Bishop Martin Bazan and Prior Diego de Acebo appointed him to the cathedral chapter of Osma.

=== Preaching to the Cathars ===
In 1203, Dominic de Guzmán joined Diego de Acebo, the Bishop of Osma, on a diplomatic mission to Denmark for the monarchy of Spain, to arrange the marriage between the son of King Alfonso VIII of Castile and a niece of King Valdemar II of Denmark. At that time the south of France was the stronghold of the Cathar movement. The Cathars (also known as Albigensians, due to their stronghold in Albi, France) were considered a heretical neo-gnostic sect. They believed that matter was evil and only the spirit was good; this was a fundamental challenge to the notion of the incarnation, central to Catholic theology. The Albigensian Crusade (1209–1229) was a 20-year military campaign initiated by Pope Innocent III to eliminate Catharism in Languedoc, in southern France.

Dominic saw the need for a response that would attempt to sway members of the Albigensian movement back to mainstream Catholic thought. Dominic became inspired to achieve this by preaching and teaching, starting near Toulouse, since the Albigensian Christians refused to compromise their principles despite the overwhelming force of the crusades brought against them. Diego suggested another reason that was possibly aiding the spread of the reform movement. The representatives of the Catholic Church acted and moved with an offensive amount of pomp and ceremony. In contrast, the Cathars generally led ascetic lifestyles. To try persuasion in place of persecution, Diego suggested that the regional papal legates begin to live a reformed apostolic life. The legates agreed to the proposed changes if they could find a strong leader who could meet the Albigensians on their own ground.

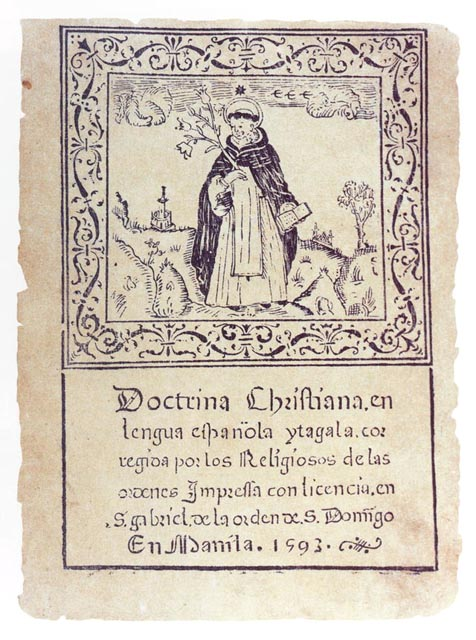
Saint Dominic on the front cover of Doctrina Christiana catechism in Spanish and Tagalog with an eight-pointed star (a symbol of the Blessed Virgin Mary) over his head. Woodcut cover. Printed in Manila in 1593.

The prior took up the challenge, and he and Dominic dedicated themselves to the conversion of the Cathars. While in the ten years of preaching Dominic converted a large number of individuals yet, the results of his preaching were less than hoped for and after it all, including the Crusade, "the population still remained at heart Albigensian." The differences in religious principles of the Albigensians called for far greater reforms than moderated appearances.

=== Dominican convent established ===
Dominic became the spiritual father to several Albigensian women he had reconciled to the faith, and in 1206 he established them in a convent in Prouille, near Toulouse. This convent would become the foundation of the Dominican nuns, thus making the Dominican nuns older than the Dominican friars. Diego sanctioned the building of a monastery for girls whose parents had sent them to the care of the Albigensians because their families were too poor to fulfill their basic needs. The monastery in Prouille would later become Dominic's headquarters for his missionary effort. After two years on the mission field, Diego died while travelling back to Spain.

== History ==
Dominic founded the Dominican Order in 1215. Dominic established a religious community in Toulouse in 1214, to be governed by the rule of Saint Augustine and statutes to govern the life of the friars, including the Primitive Constitution. The founding documents establish that the order was founded for two purposes: preaching and the salvation of souls.

Henri-Dominique Lacordaire noted that the statutes had similarities with the constitutions of the Premonstratensians, indicating that Dominic had drawn inspiration from the reform of Prémontré.

=== Middle Ages ===
In July 1215, with the approbation of Bishop Foulques of Toulouse, Dominic ordered his followers into an institutional life. Its purpose was revolutionary in the pastoral ministry of the Catholic Church. These priests were organized and well trained in religious studies. Dominic needed a framework - a rule - to organize these components. The Rule of Saint Augustine was an obvious choice for the Dominican Order, according to Dominic's successor Jordan of Saxony, in the Libellus de principiis, because it lent itself to the "salvation of souls through preaching". By this choice, however, the Dominican brothers designated themselves not monks, but canons regular. They could practice ministry and common life while existing in individual poverty.

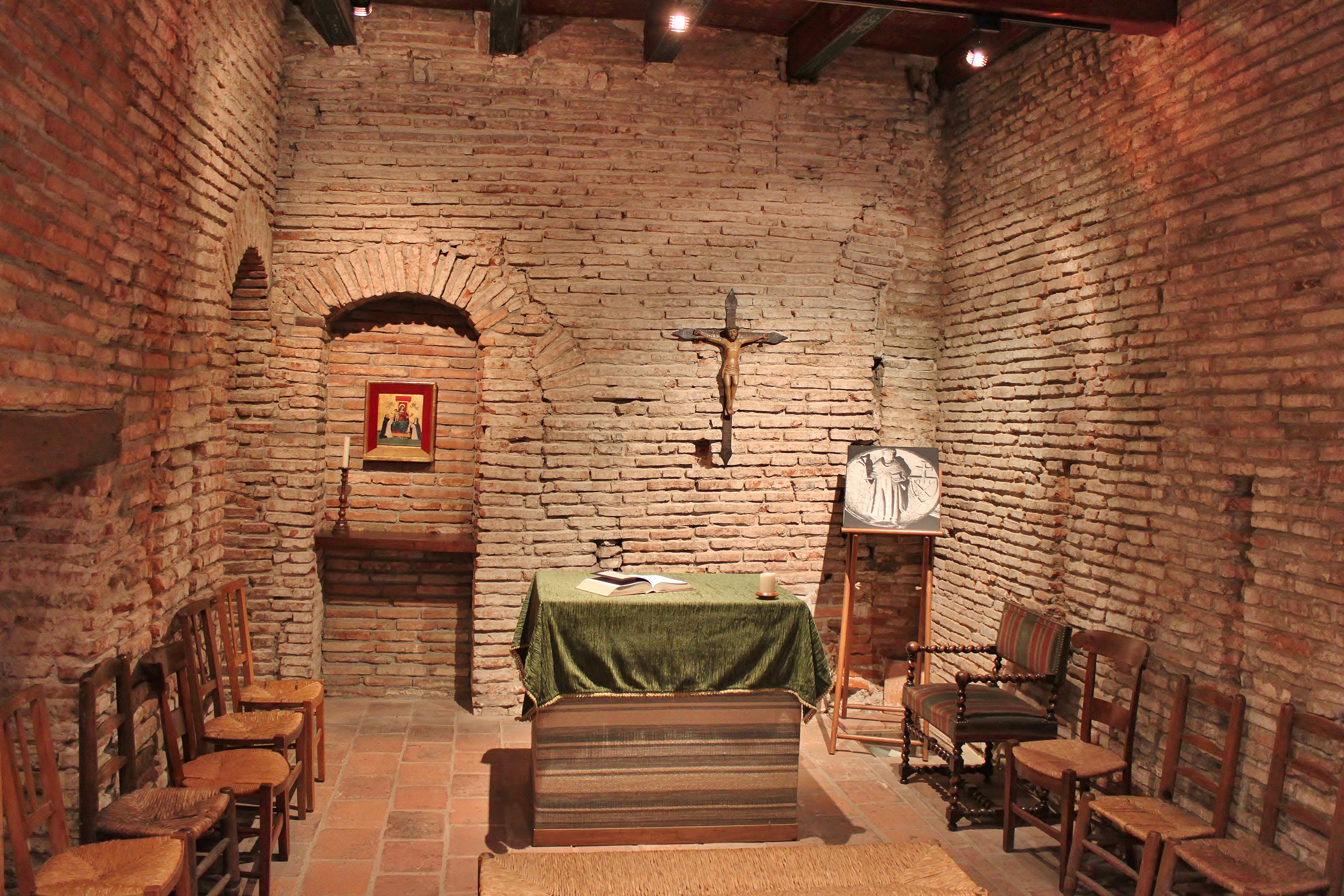
Dominic's room at Maison Seilhan, in Toulouse, is considered the place where the order was born.

The Order of Preachers was approved in December 1216 and January 1217 by Pope Honorius III in the papal bulls Religiosam vitam and Nos attendentes. On January 21, 1217, Honorius issued the bull Gratiarum omnium recognizing Dominic's followers as an order dedicated to study and universally authorized to preach, a power formerly reserved to local episcopal authorization.

Along with charity, the other concept that most defines the work and spirituality of the order is study, the method most used by the Dominicans in working to defend the church against the perils it faced. In Dominic's thinking, it was impossible for men to preach what they did not or could not understand. On August 15, 1217, Dominic dispatched seven of his followers to the great university center of Paris to establish a priory focused on study and preaching. The Convent of St. Jacques would eventually become the order's first studium generale. Dominic was to establish similar foundations at other university towns of the day, Bologna in 1218, Palencia and Montpellier in 1220, and Oxford just before his death in 1221. The women of the order also established schools for the children of the local gentry.

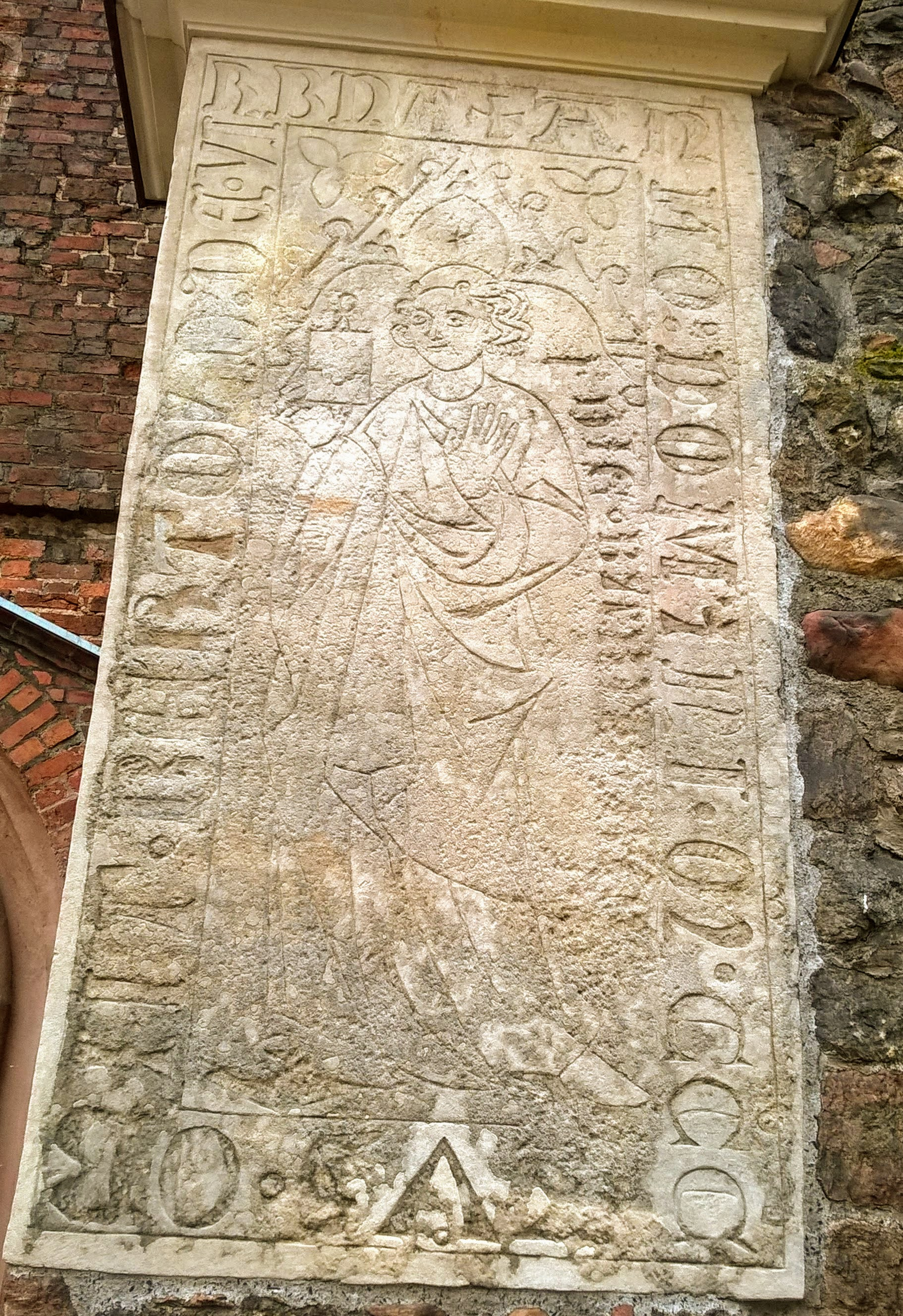
Dominican epitaph of Berthold de Wyrbna from 1316 on the tower of the parish church in Szprotawa, Poland

In 1219, Pope Honorius III invited Dominic and his companions to take up residence at the ancient Roman basilica of Santa Sabina, which they did by early 1220. Before that time the friars had only a temporary residence in Rome at the convent of San Sisto Vecchio which Honorius III had given to Dominic circa 1218 intending it to become a convent for a reformation of nuns at Rome under Dominic's guidance. In May 1220 at Bologna the order's first General Chapter mandated that each new priory of the order maintain its own studium conventuale, thus laying the foundation of the Dominican tradition of sponsoring widespread institutions of learning. The official foundation of the Dominican convent at Santa Sabina with its studium conventuale occurred with the legal transfer of property from Honorius III to the Order of Preachers on June 5, 1222. This studium was transformed into the order's first studium provinciale by Thomas Aquinas in 1265. Part of the curriculum of this studium was relocated in 1288 at the studium of Santa Maria sopra Minerva which in the 16th century world be transformed into the College of Saint Thomas (Latin: Collegium Divi Thomæ). In the 20th century the college would be relocated to the convent of Saints Dominic and Sixtus and would be transformed into the Pontifical University of Saint Thomas Aquinas, Angelicum.

The Dominican friars quickly spread, including to England, where they appeared in Oxford in 1221. In the 13th century the order reached all classes of Christian society, fought heresy, schism, and paganism by word and book, and by its missions to the north of Europe, to Africa, and Asia passed beyond the frontiers of Christendom. Its schools spread throughout the entire church; its doctors wrote monumental works in all branches of knowledge, including the extremely important Albertus Magnus and Thomas Aquinas. Its members included popes, cardinals, bishops, legates, inquisitors, confessors of princes, ambassadors, and paciarii (enforcers of the peace decreed by popes or councils).

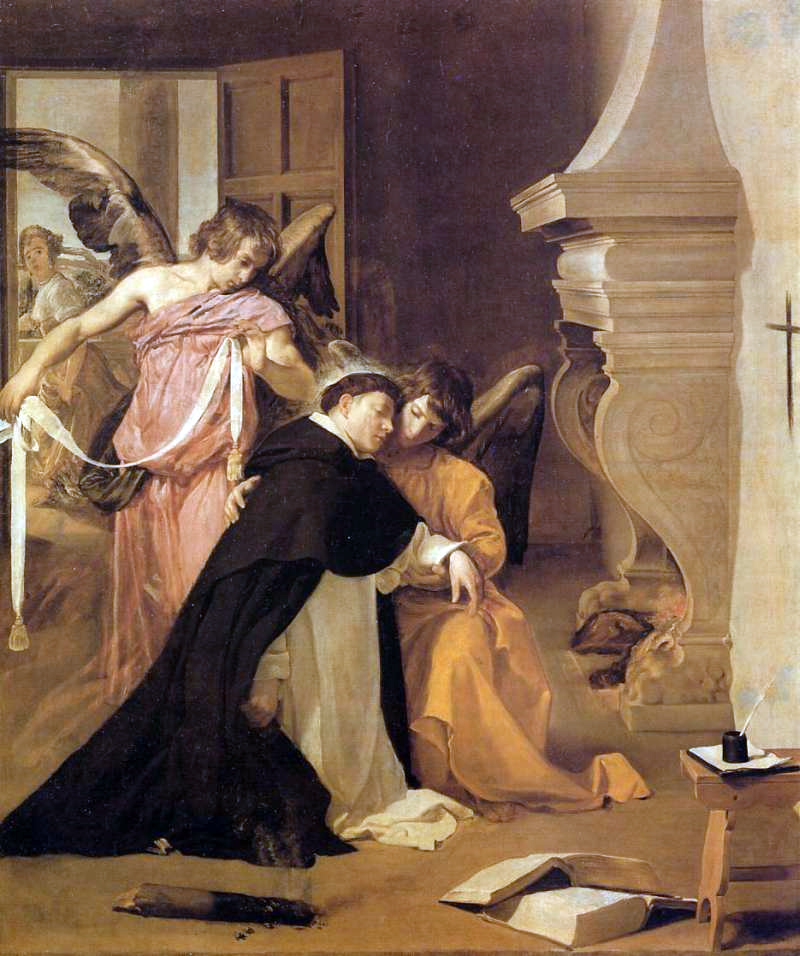
Doctor Angelicus, Thomas Aquinas (1225–1274), considered by many Catholics to be the greatest Catholic theologian, is girded by angels with a mystical belt of purity after his proof of chastity.

The order's origins in battling heterodoxy influenced its later development and reputation. Many later Dominicans battled heresy as part of their apostolate; many years after Dominic reacted to the Cathars, the first Grand Inquistor of Spain, Tomás de Torquemada, would be drawn from the Dominican Order. The order was appointed by Pope Gregory IX the duty to carry out the Inquisition. Torture was not regarded as a mode of punishment, but as a means of eliciting the truth. In his papal bull Ad extirpanda of 1252, Pope Innocent IV authorised the Dominicans' use of torture under prescribed circumstances.

The expansion of the order produced changes. A smaller emphasis on doctrinal activity favoured the development here and there of the ascetic and contemplative life and there sprang up, especially in Germany and Italy, the mystical movement with which the names of Meister Eckhart, Heinrich Suso, Johannes Tauler, and Catherine of Siena are associated. (See German mysticism, which has also been called "Dominican mysticism".) This movement was the prelude to the reforms undertaken, at the end of the century, by Raymond of Capua, and continued in the following century.

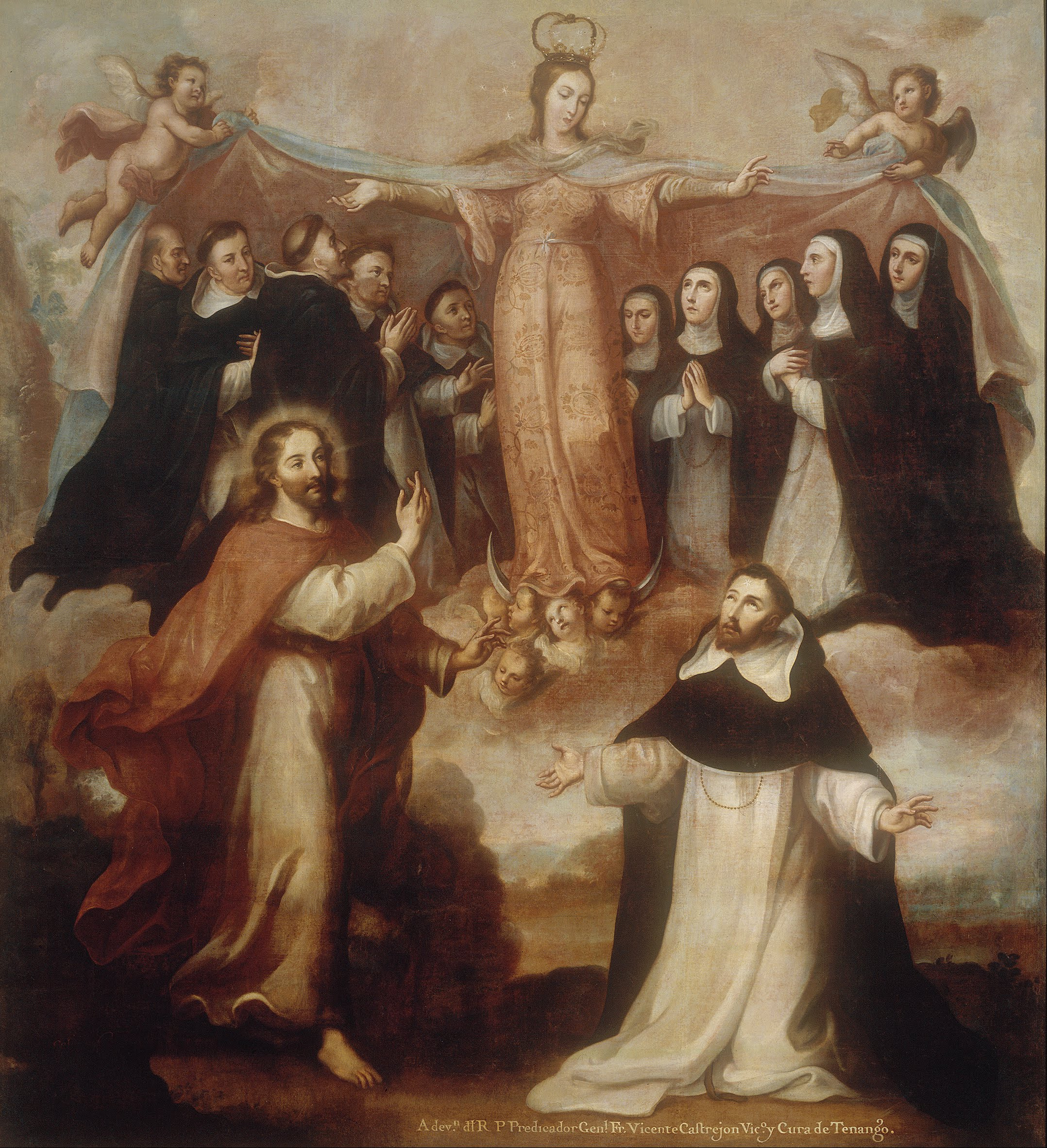
Allegory of the Virgin Patroness of the Dominicans by Miguel Cabrera

At the same time, the order found itself face to face with the Renaissance. It struggled against pagan tendencies in Renaissance humanism, in Italy through Dominici and Savonarola, in Germany through the theologians of Cologne but it also furnished humanism with such advanced writers as Francesco Colonna (probably the writer of the Hypnerotomachia Poliphili) and Matteo Bandello. Many Dominicans took part in the artistic activity of the age, the most prominent being Fra Angelico and Fra Bartolomeo.

==== Women ====
Although Dominic and the early brethren had instituted female Dominican houses at Prouille and other places by 1227, houses of women attached to the Order became so popular that some of the friars had misgivings about the increasing demands of female religious establishments on their time and resources. Nonetheless, women's houses dotted the countryside throughout Europe. There were 74 Dominican female houses in Germany, 42 in Italy, 9 in France, 8 in Spain, 6 in Bohemia, 3 in Hungary, and 3 in Poland. Many of the German religious houses that lodged women had been home to communities of women, such as Beguines, that became Dominican once they were taught by the traveling preachers and put under the jurisdiction of the Dominican authoritative structure. A number of these houses became centers of study and mystical spirituality in the 14th century, as expressed in works such as the sister-books. There were 157 nunneries in the order by 1358. After that year, the number lessened considerably due to the Black Death.

In places besides Germany, convents were founded as retreats from the world for women of the upper classes. These were original projects funded by wealthy patrons. Among these was Countess Margaret of Flanders who established the monastery of Lille, while Val-Duchesse at Oudergem near Brussels was built with the wealth of Adelaide of Burgundy, Duchess of Brabant (1262).

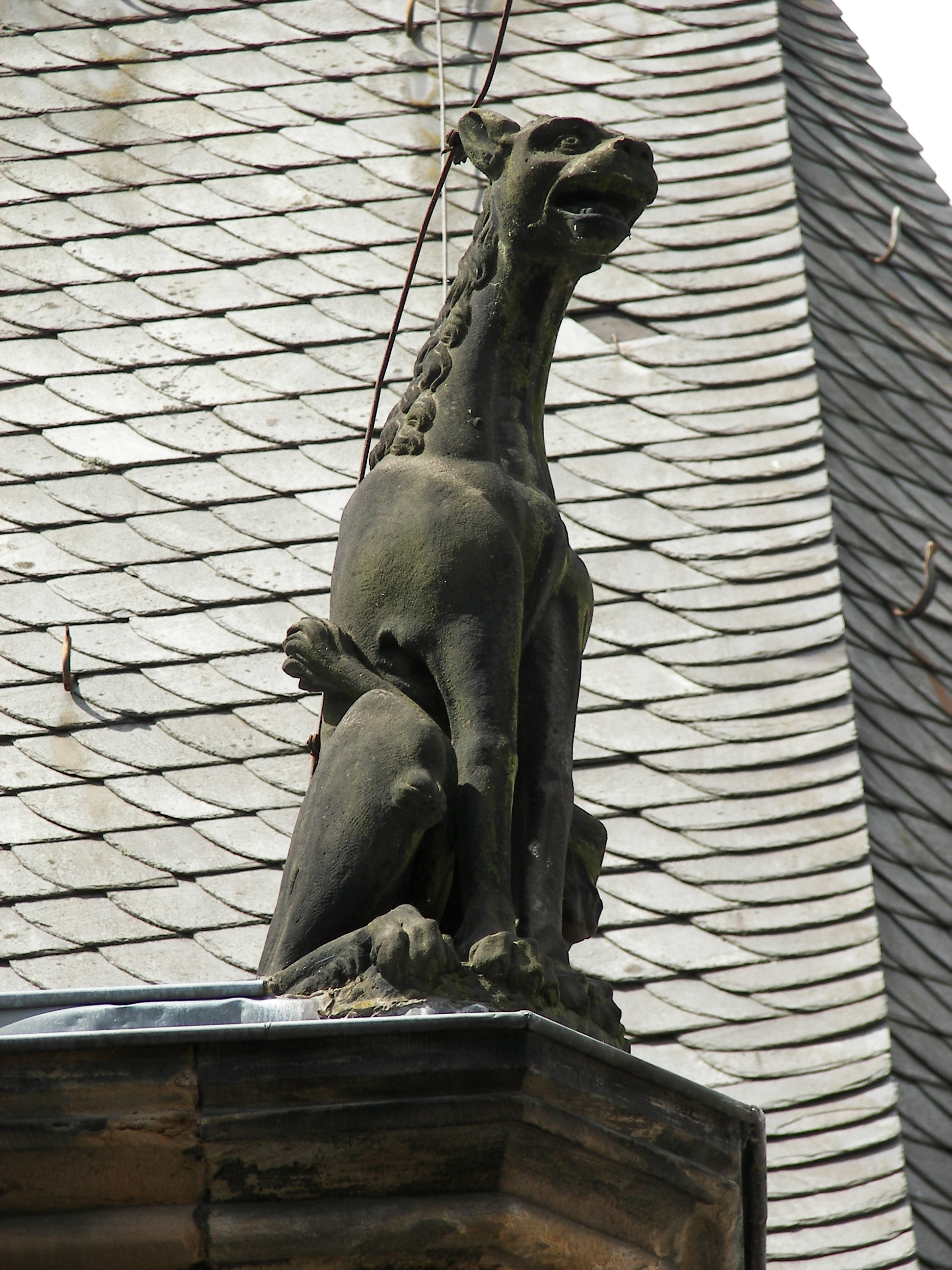
A figure depicting the term domini canes ('hounds of the lord') since the Inquisition in the 13th century, (Note: The reference to "hounds" draws on the tradition that Dominic's mother, while pregnant with him, had a vision of a black and white dog with a torch in its mouth; wherever the dog went, it set fire to the earth. It was explained that the vision was fulfilled when Dominic and his followers went forth, clad in black and white, setting fire to the earth with the Gospel. In English, the word "hound" has two further meanings that may be drawn upon. A hound is loyal, and the Dominicans have a reputation as obedient servants of the faith.) on a corner of a former Dominican monastery (before the Reformation), Old University, Marburg, Germany

Female houses differed from male Dominican houses in that they were enclosed. The sisters chanted the Divine Office and kept all the monastic observances. The nuns lived under the authority of the general and provincial chapters of the order. They shared in all the applicable privileges of the order. The friars served as their confessors, priests, teachers and spiritual mentors.

Women could be professed to the Dominican religious life at the age of 13. The formula for profession contained in the Constitutions of Montargis Priory (1250) requires that nuns pledge obedience to God, the Blessed Virgin, their prioress and her successors according to the Rule of Saint Augustine and the institute of the order, until death. The clothing of the sisters consisted of a white tunic and scapular, a leather belt, a black mantle, and a black veil. Candidates to profession were questioned to reveal whether they were actually married women who had merely separated from their husbands. Their intellectual abilities were also tested. Nuns were to be silent in places of prayer, the cloister, the dormitory, and refectory. Silence was maintained unless the prioress granted an exception for a specific cause. Speaking was allowed in the common parlor, but it was subordinate to strict rules, and the prioress, subprioress or other senior nun had to be present.

As well as sewing, embroidery and other genteel pursuits, the nuns participated in a number of intellectual activities, including reading and discussing pious literature. In the Strassburg monastery of Saint Margaret, some of the nuns could converse fluently in Latin. Learning still had an elevated place in the lives of these religious. In fact, Margarette Reglerin, a daughter of a wealthy Nuremberg family, was dismissed from a convent because she did not have the ability or will to learn.

==== English Province ====
The English Province and the Hungarian Province both date back to the second general chapter of the Dominican Order, held in Bologna during the spring of 1221.

Dominic dispatched 12 friars to England under the guidance of their English prior, Gilbert of Fresney, and they landed in Dover on August 5, 1221. The province officially came into being at its first provincial chapter in 1230.

The English Province was a component of the international order from which it obtained its laws, direction, and instructions. It was also, however, a group of Englishmen. Its direct supervisors were from England, and the members of the English Province dwelt and labored in English cities, towns, villages, and roadways. English and European ingredients constantly came in contact. The international side of the province's existence influenced the national, and the national responded to, adapted, and sometimes constrained the international.

The first Dominican site in England was at Oxford, in the parishes of St. Edward and St. Adelaide. The friars built an oratory to the Blessed Virgin Mary and by 1265, the brethren, in keeping with their devotion to study, began erecting a school. The Dominican brothers likely began a school immediately after their arrival, as priories were legally schools. Information about the schools of the English Province is limited, but a few facts are known. Much of the information available is taken from visitation records. The "visitation" was an inspection of the province by which visitors to each priory could describe the state of its religious life and its studies at the next chapter. There were four such visits in England - Oxford, London, Cambridge and York. All Dominican students were required to learn grammar, old and new logic, natural philosophy and theology. Of all of the curricular areas, however, theology was the most important.

Dartford Priory was established long after the primary period of monastic foundation in England had ended. It emulated, then, the monasteries found in Europe - mainly France and Germany - as well as the monastic traditions of their English Dominican brothers. The first nuns to inhabit Dartford were sent from the priory of Poissy in France. Even on the eve of the Dissolution, Prioress Jane Vane wrote to Cromwell on behalf of a postulant, saying that though she had not actually been professed, she was professed in her heart and in the eyes of God. Profession in Dartford Priory seems, then, to have been made based on personal commitment, and one's personal association with God.

As heirs of the Dominican priory of Poissy in France, the nuns of Dartford Priory in England were also heirs to a tradition of learning and piety. Strict discipline and plain living were characteristic of the monastery throughout its existence.

=== From the Reformation to the French Revolution ===
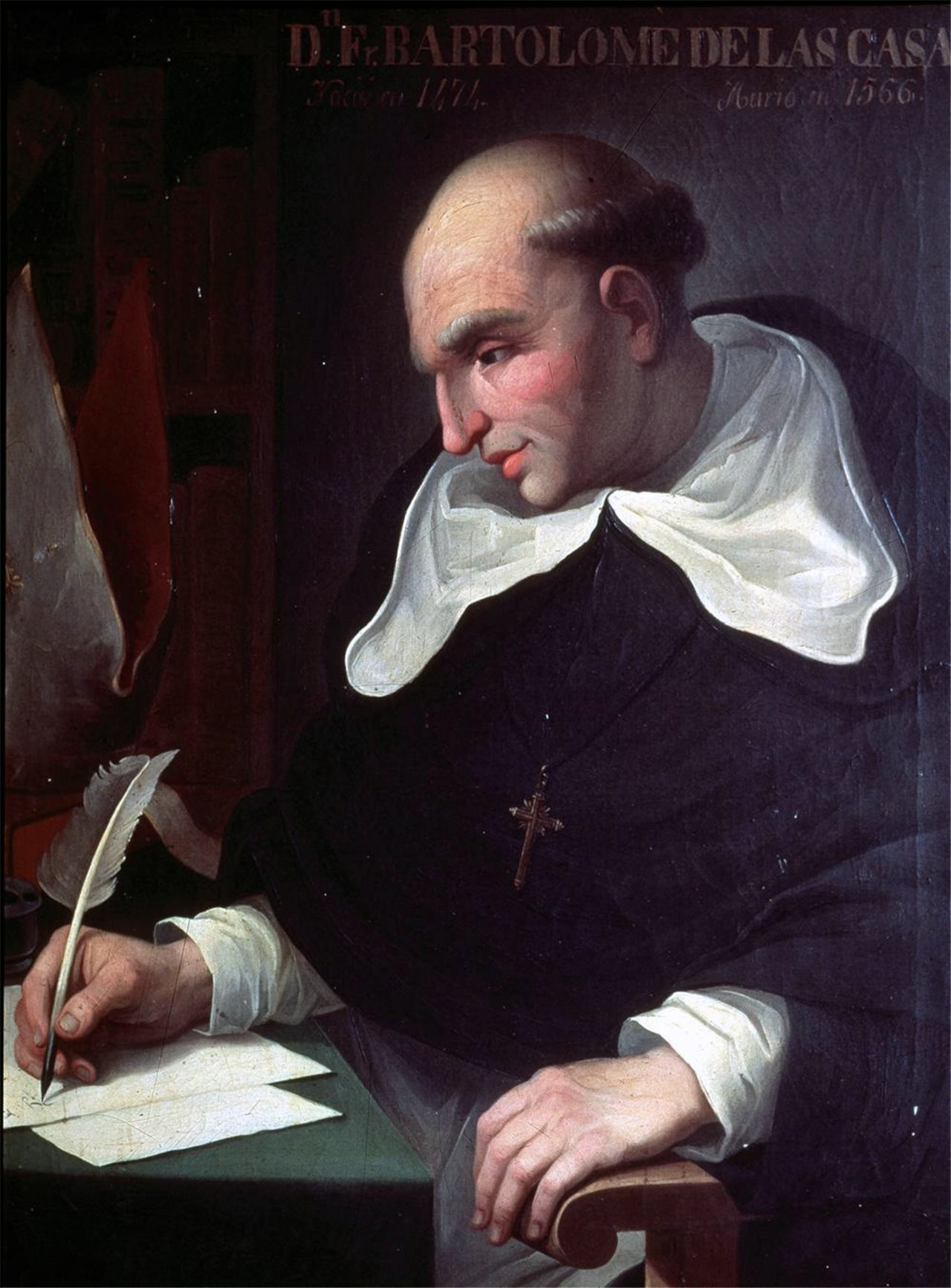
Bartolomé de Las Casas (c. 1484–1566)

Bartolomé de Las Casas, as a settler in the New World, was galvanized by witnessing the brutal torture and genocide of the Native Americans by the Spanish colonists. He became famous for his advocacy of the rights of Native Americans, whose cultures, especially in the Caribbean, he describes with care.

Gaspar da Cruz (c. 1520–1570), who worked all over the Portuguese colonial empire in Asia, was probably the first Christian missionary to preach (unsuccessfully) in Cambodia. After a (similarly unsuccessful) stint, in 1556, in Guangzhou, China, he eventually returned to Portugal and became the first European to publish a book devoted exclusively to China in 1569/1570.

The beginning of the 16th century confronted the order with the upheavals of Reformation. The spread of Protestantism cost it six or seven provinces and several hundreds of convents, but the discovery of the New World opened up a fresh field of activity. In the 18th century, there were numerous attempts at reform, accompanied by a reduction in the number of devotees. The French Revolution ruined the order in France, and crises that more or less rapidly followed considerably lessened or wholly destroyed numerous provinces.

=== From the 19th century to the present ===
During the early 19th century, the number of Preachers seems never to have sunk below 3,500. Statistics for 1876 show 3,748, but 500 of these had been expelled from their convents and were engaged in parochial work. Statistics for 1910 show a total of 4,472 nominally or actually engaged in proper activities of the order. By 2013, there were 6,058 Dominican friars, including 4,470 priests, and as of 2024 there were 5,369 friars overall (with 4,073 being priests).

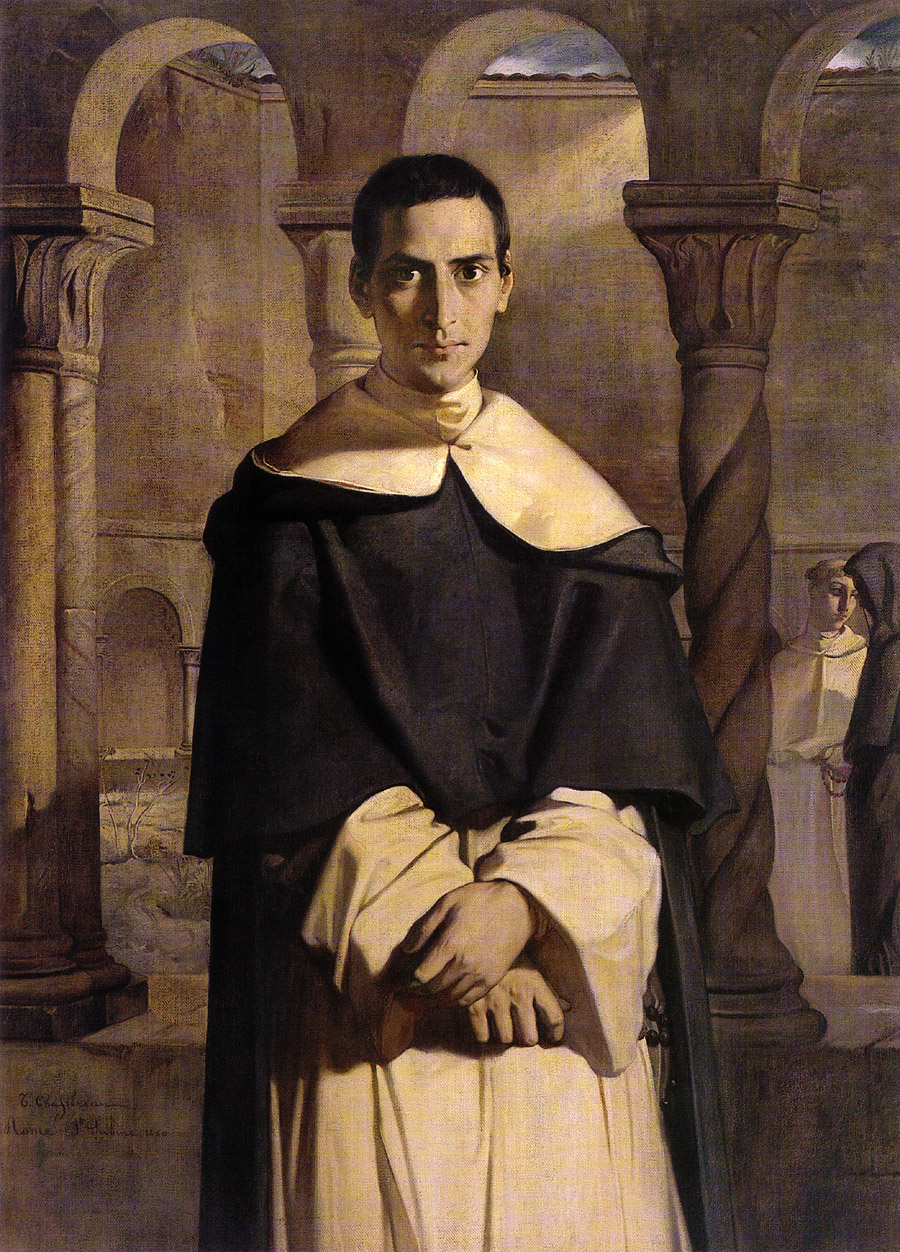
Portrait of Lacordaire

France held a foremost place in the revival movement, owing to the reputation and convincing power of the orator, Jean-Baptiste Henri Lacordaire (1802–1861). He took the habit of a Friar Preacher at Rome (1839), and the province of France was canonically erected in 1850. From this province were detached the province of Lyon, called Occitania (1862), that of Toulouse (1869), and that of Canada (1909). The French restoration likewise furnished many laborers to other provinces, to assist in their organization and progress. From it came the master general who remained longest at the head of the administration during the 19th century, Père Vincent Jandel (1850–1872).

The province of Saint Joseph in the United States was founded in 1805 by Edward Fenwick (1768–1832), afterwards first Bishop of Cincinnati, Ohio (1821–1832). In 1905 it established the Dominican House of Studies in Washington, DC.

The province of France has produced many preachers. The conferences of Notre-Dame-de-Paris were inaugurated by Père Lacordaire. The Dominicans of the province of France furnished Lacordaire (1835–1836, 1843–1851), Jacques Monsabré, and Joseph Ollivier. The pulpit of Notre Dame has been occupied by a succession of Dominicans. Père Henri Didon (1840–1900) was a Dominican. The house of studies of the province of France publishes L'Année Dominicaine (founded 1859), La Revue des Sciences Philosophiques et Theologiques (1907), and La Revue de la Jeunesse (1909). French Dominicans founded and administer the École Biblique et Archéologique française de Jérusalem founded in 1890 by Marie-Joseph Lagrange (1855–1938), one of the leading international centres for biblical research. It is at the École Biblique that the famed Jerusalem Bible (both editions) was prepared. Likewise Cardinal Yves Congar was a product of the French province of the Order of Preachers.

Doctrinal development has had an important place in the restoration of the Preachers. Several institutions, besides those already mentioned, played important parts. Such is the École Biblique at Jerusalem, open to the religious of the order and to secular clerics, which publishes the Revue Biblique. The Pontificium Collegium Internationale Angelicum, the future Pontifical University of Saint Thomas Aquinas (Angelicum) established in Rome in 1908 by Master Hyacinth Cormier, opened its doors to regulars and seculars for the study of the sacred sciences. In addition to the reviews above are the Revue Thomiste, founded by Père Thomas Coconnier (d. 1908), and the Analecta Ordinis Prædicatorum (1893). Among numerous writers of the order in this period are: Cardinals Thomas Zigliara (d. 1893) and Zephirin González (d. 1894), two esteemed philosophers; Alberto Guillelmotti (d. 1893), historian of the Pontifical Navy, and historian Heinrich Denifle (d. 1905).

During the Reformation, many of the convents of Dominican nuns were forced to close. One which managed to survive, and afterwards founded many new houses, was St Ursula's in Augsburg. In the 17th century, convents of Dominican women were often asked by their bishops to undertake apostolic work, particularly educating girls and visiting the sick. St Ursula's returned to an enclosed life in the 18th century, but in the 19th century, after Napoleon had closed many European convents, King Louis I of Bavaria in 1828 restored the Religious Orders of women in his realm, provided that the nuns undertook some active work useful to the State (usually teaching or nursing). In 1877, Bishop Ricards in South Africa requested that Augsburg send a group of nuns to start a teaching mission in King Williamstown. From this mission were founded many Third Order Regular congregations of Dominican sisters, with their own constitutions, though still following the Rule of Saint Augustine and affiliated to the Dominican Order. These include the Dominican Sisters of Oakford, KwazuluNatal (1881), the Dominican Missionary Sisters, Zimbabwe (1890) and the Dominican Sisters of Newcastle, KwazuluNatal (1891).

The Dominican Order has influenced the formation of other orders outside of the Catholic Church, such as the Anglican Order of Preachers within the Anglican Communion. Since not all members are obliged to take solemn or simple vows of poverty, chastity, and obedience, it operates more like a third order with a third order style structure, with no contemporary or canonical ties to the historical order founded by Dominic of Guzman. The Order of Christ the Saviour is a dispersed Anglo-Catholic Dominican community founded in the 21st century within the Episcopal Church.

=== Missions abroad ===
The Pax Mongolica of the 13th and 14th centuries that united vast parts of the European-Asian continents enabled Western missionaries to travel east. "Dominican friars were preaching the Gospel on the Volga Steppes by 1225 (the year following the establishment of the Kipchak Khanate by Batu), and in 1240 Pope Gregory IX despatched others to Persia and Armenia." The most famous Dominican was Jordanus Catala de Severac who was sent first to Persia then in 1321, together with a companion (Nicolas of Pistoia) to India. Catala's work and observations are recorded in a book, Mirabilia, which was translated as Wonders of the East.

Another Dominican, Ricold of Monte Croce, worked in Syria and Persia. His travels took him from Acre to Tabriz, and on to Baghdad. There "he was welcomed by the Dominican fathers already there, and with them entered into a disputation with the Nestorians." Although a number of Dominicans and Franciscans persevered against the growing faith of Islam throughout the region, all Christian missionaries were soon expelled with Timur's death in 1405.

By the 1850s, the Dominicans had half a million followers in the Philippines and well-established missions in the Chinese province of Fujian and Tonkin, Vietnam, performing thousands of baptisms each year. The Dominicans presence in the Philippines has become one of the leading proponents of education with the establishment of Colegio de San Juan de Letran.

== Divisions ==
The friars, nuns, third orders (Dominican laity), and the members of priestly fraternities of Saint Dominic form the Order of Preachers. Together with the religious sisters, Associates of the Religious Sisters, and Dominican youth they form the Dominican Family.

=== Governance ===
The highest authority within the Order of Preachers is the General Chapter, which is empowered to develop legislation governing all organizations within the Dominican umbrella, as well as enforce that legislation. The General Chapter is composed of two bodies, the Chapter of Provincials and the Chapter of Definitors (or Diffinitors), a unique configuration within the Catholic Church. Each body is of equal authority to propose legislation and discuss other matters of general importance within the order, and each body may be called individually or jointly. The Provincials consists of the superiors of individual Dominican provinces, while the Diffinitors consists of "grass root" representatives of each province, so created to avoid provincial superiors having to spend excessive time away from their day-to-day duties of governing. To maintain stability of the legislation of the order, new legislation is enacted only when approved by three successive meetings of the General Chapter.

The first General Chapters were held at Pentecost in the years 1220 and 1221. More recent General Chapters have been held as follows:

- 1998 – Bologna, Italy
- 2001 – Providence, USA
- 2004 – Kraków, Poland
- 2010 – 290th General Chapter, 1–21 September 2010, Rome, which elaborated the mission mandates of the order
- 2016 – Bologna
- 2019 – Elective General Chapter, 9 July – 4 August 2019, at the Convent of St. Martin de Porres, Biên Hòa, Viet Nam
- 2022 – 16 July – 8 August 2022, Tultenango in the State of Mexico, a Chapter of Definitors

The General Chapter elects a Master of the Order, who has "broad and direct authority over every brother, convent and province, and over every nun and monastery". The master is considered the successor of Dominic, the first Master of the Order, who envisioned the office to be one of service to the community. The master is currently elected for a nine-year term, and is aided by the General Curia of the Order. His authority is subject only to the General Chapter. He, along with the General Chapter, may assign members, and appoint or remove superiors and other officials for the good of the order.

=== Nuns ===
The Dominican nuns were founded by Dominic even before he had established the friars. They are contemplatives in the cloistered life. The nuns celebrated their 800th anniversary in 2006. Some monasteries raise funds for their operations by producing religious articles such as priestly vestments or baking communion wafers.

=== Friars ===
Friars are male members of the order, and consist of members ordained to the priesthood as well as non-ordained members, known as cooperator brothers. Both priests and cooperators participate in a variety of ministries, including preaching, parish assignments, educational ministries, social work, and related fields. Dominican life is organized into four pillars that define the order's charism: prayer, study, community and preaching. Dominicans are known for their intellectual rigor that informs their preaching, as well as engaging in academic debate with contemporary scholars. A significant period of academic study is required prior to taking their Solemn vow of membership.

=== Religious sisters ===
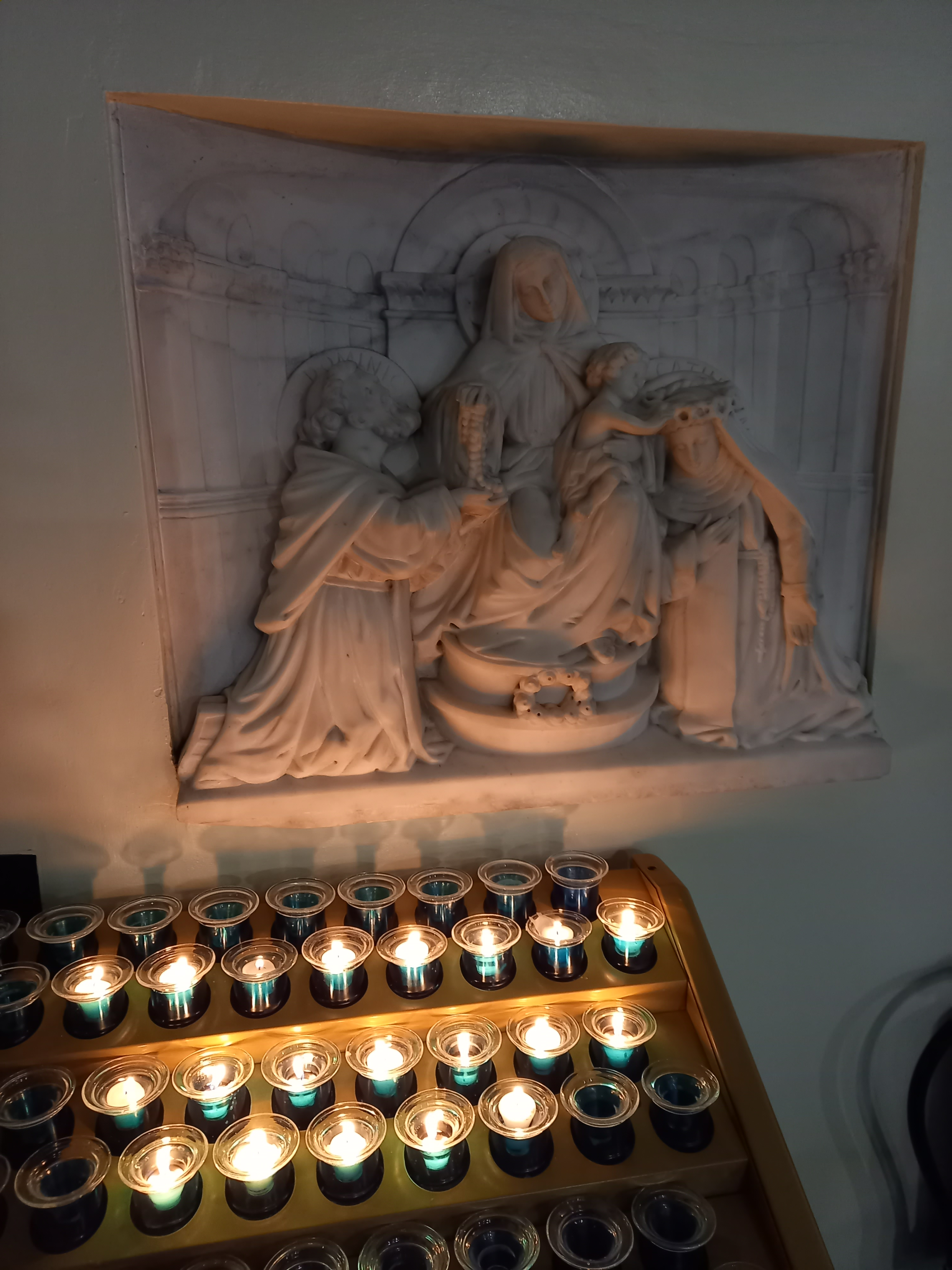
Marble relief of SS Dominic and Catherine

Women have been part of the Dominican Order since the beginning, but distinct active congregations of Dominican sisters in their current form are largely a product of the nineteenth century and afterward. They draw their origins both from the Dominican nuns and the communities of women tertiaries (laywomen) who lived in their own homes and gathered regularly to pray and study: the most famous of these was the Mantellates attached to Saint Dominic's church in Siena, to which Catherine of Siena belonged. In the seventeenth century, some European Dominican monasteries (e.g. St Ursula's, Augsburg) temporarily became no longer enclosed, so they could engage in teaching or nursing or other work in response to pressing local need. Any daughter houses they founded, however, became independent. But in the nineteenth century, in response to increasing missionary fervor, monasteries were asked to send groups of women to found schools and medical clinics around the world. Large numbers of Catholic women traveled to Africa, the Americas, and the East to teach and support new communities of Catholics there, both settlers and converts. Owing to the large distances involved, these groups needed to be self-governing, and they frequently planted new self-governing congregations in neighboring mission areas in order to respond more effectively to the perceived pastoral needs. Following on from this period of growth in the nineteenth century, and another great period of growth in those joining these congregations in the 1950s, by 2016 there were 24,600 sisters belonging to 150 Dominican religious congregations present in 109 countries affiliated to Dominican Sisters International. By 2026, there were 21,324 Dominican sisters, including 3,000 cloistered nuns.

As well as the friars, Dominican sisters live their lives supported by four common values, often referred to as the Four Pillars of Dominican Life, they are community life, common prayer, study, and service. Dominic called this fourfold pattern of life "holy preaching". Henri Matisse was so moved by the care that he received from the Dominican sisters that he collaborated in the design and interior decoration of their Chapelle du Saint-Marie du Rosaire in Vence, France.

=== Priestly Fraternities of St. Dominic ===
The Priestly Fraternities of St. Dominic consist of diocesan priests who are formally affiliated to, and "true members" of, the Order of Preachers (Dominicans) through a rule of life that they profess, and who strive for evangelical perfection under the overall direction of the Dominican friars. The origins of the Dominican fraternities can be traced from the Dominican third Order secular, which then included both priests and lay persons as members. Now existing as a separate association from that of the laity, and with its own distinct rule to follow, the Priestly Fraternities of St. Dominic continue to be guided by the order in embracing the gift of the spirituality of Dominic in the unique context of the diocesan priesthood. Along with the special grace of the Sacrament of Holy Orders, which helps them to perform the acts of the sacred ministry worthily, they receive new spiritual help from the profession, which makes them members of the Dominican Family and sharers in the grace and mission of the order. While the order provides them with these spiritual aids and directs them to their own sanctification, it leaves them free for the complete service of the local church, under the jurisdiction of their own bishop.

=== Dominican laity (tertiary/third order) ===
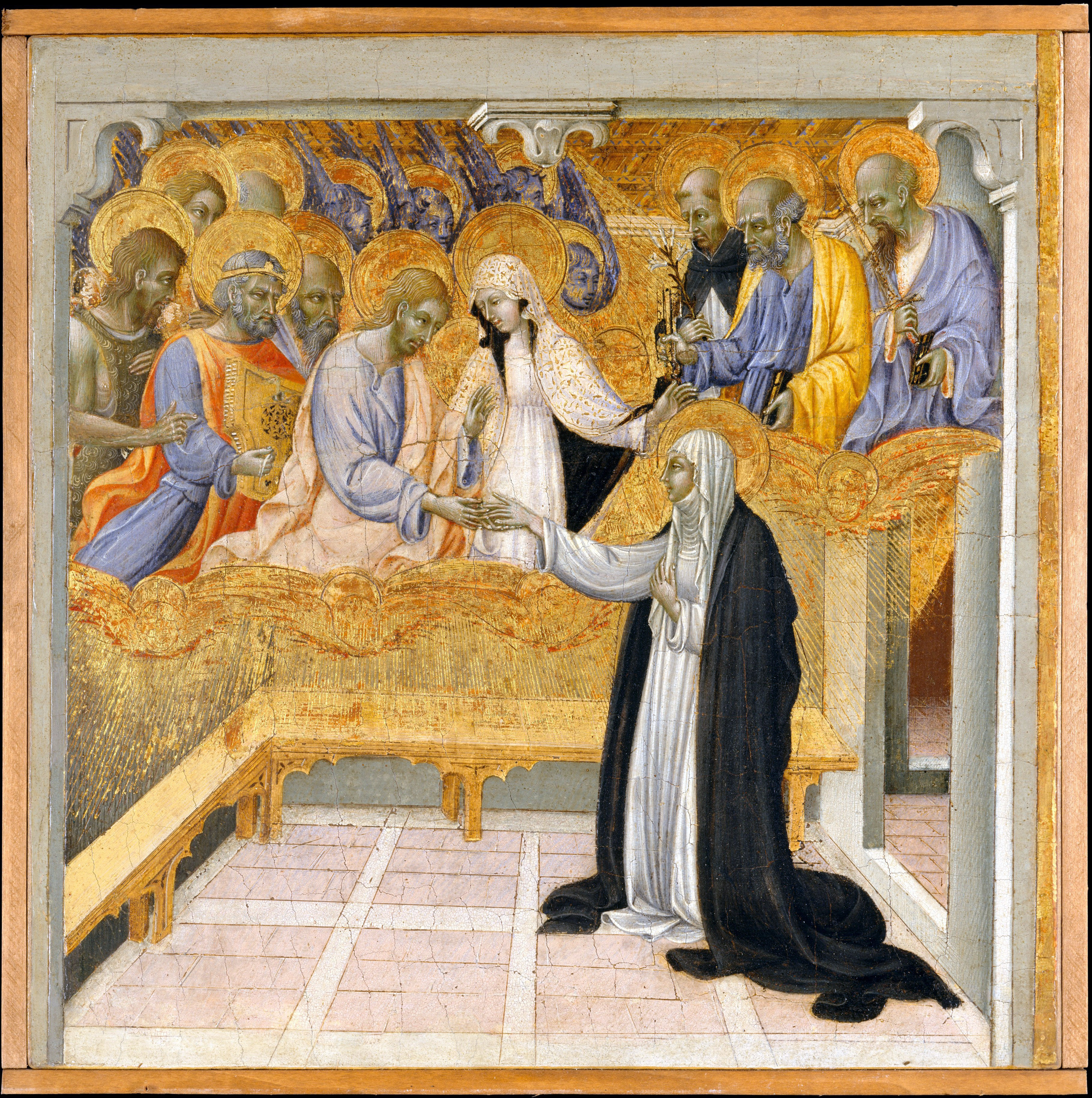
The Mystic Marriage of Saint Catherine of Siena (1347–1380) by Giovanni di Paolo, c. 1460 (Metropolitan Museum of Art, New York)

Lay Dominicans are governed by their own rule, the Rule of the Lay Fraternities of St. Dominic, promulgated by the Master in 1987. It is the fifth Rule of the Dominican Laity; the first was issued in 1285. Lay Dominicans are also governed by the Fundamental Constitution of the Dominican Laity, and their provinces provide a General Directory and Statutes. According to their Fundamental Constitution of the Dominican Laity, sec. 4, "They have a distinctive character in both their spirituality and their service to God and neighbor. As members of the Order, they share in its apostolic mission through prayer, study and preaching according to the state of the laity."

Pope Pius XII, in Chosen Laymen, an Address to the Third Order of St. Dominic (1958), said, "The true condition of salvation is to meet the divine invitation by accepting the Catholic 'credo' and by observing the commandments. But the Lord expects more from you [Lay Dominicans], and the Church urges you to continue seeking the intimate knowledge of God and His works, to search for a more complete and valuable expression of this knowledge, a refinement of the Christian attitudes which derive from this knowledge."

Notable saints among the Lay Dominicans are Catherine of Siena, a Doctor of the Church, and Rose of Lima, the Patron saint of Peru and All of South America.

=== Associates ===
In the 20th century, Associates who share the Dominican charism with congregations of religious sisters were formed. Dominican Associates are Christian women and men; married, single, divorced, and widowed; clergy members and lay persons who were first drawn to and then called to live out the charism and continue the mission of the Dominican Order - to praise, to bless, to preach. Associates do not take vows, but rather make a commitment to be partners with vowed members, and to share the mission and charism of the Dominican Family in their own lives, families, churches, neighborhoods, workplaces, and cities. They are most often associated with a particular apostolic work of the congregation of active Dominican sisters to which they belong.

== Spirituality ==
The Dominican emphasis on learning and charity distinguishes it from other monastic and mendicant orders. As the order first developed in Europe, learning continued to be emphasized by those friars and their sisters in Christ. These religious also struggled for a deeply personal and intimate relationship with God. When the order reached England, many of the attributes were kept, but the English gave the order additional specialized characteristics.

=== Humbert of Romans ===
Serving as master general of the order from 1254 to 1263, Humbert of Romans was a notable administrator, preacher, and author. During his tenure, the nuns of the order received a revised constitution. In addition, his emphasis on cultivating excellence in preaching among the friars remains his most enduring contribution to the order.

Humbert is at the center of ascetic writers in the Dominican Order. He advised his readers,

"[Young Dominicans] are also to be instructed not to be eager to see visions or work miracles, since these avail little to salvation, and sometimes we are fooled by them; but rather they should be eager to do good in which salvation consists. Also, they should be taught not to be sad if they do not enjoy the divine consolations they hear others have; but they should know the loving Father for some reason sometimes withholds these. Again, they should learn that if they lack the grace of compunction or devotion they should not think they are not in the state of grace as long as they have good will, which is all that God regards". The English Dominicans took this to heart and made it the focal point of their mysticism.

=== Mysticism ===
The Dominican Order was affected by a number of elemental influences. Its early members imbued the order with a mysticism and learning. Mysticism refers to the conviction that all believers have the capability to experience God's love. This love may manifest itself through brief ecstatic experiences, such that one may be engulfed by God and gain an immediate knowledge of him, which is unknowable through the intellect alone. Although the ultimate attainment for mysticism is union with God, the goal is just as much to become like Christ as it is to become one with him.

The Europeans of the order embraced ecstatic mysticism on a grand scale and looked to a union with the Creator. The English Dominicans looked for this complete unity as well but were not so focused on ecstatic experiences. Instead, their goal was to emulate the moral life of Christ more completely. The Dartford nuns were surrounded by all of those legacies and used them to create something unique.

==== Saint Albertus Magnus ====
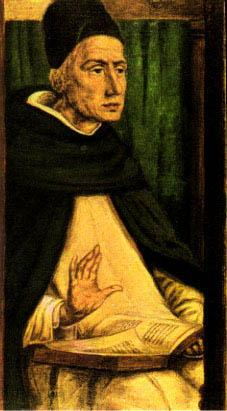
Painting of Albertus Magnus (1206–1280) by Justus van Gent, c. 1475

Another member of the order who contributed significantly to its spirituality is Albert the Great, whose influence on the brotherhood permeated nearly every aspect of Dominican life. Albertus Magnus championed the idea, drawn from Dionysius the Areopagite, that positive knowledge of God is possible but obscure. Thus, it is easier to state what God is not than to state what God is:

[W]e affirm things of God only relatively, that is, casually, whereas we deny things of God absolutely, that is, with reference to what He is in Himself. And there is no contradiction between a relative affirmation and an absolute negation. It is not contradictory to say that someone is white-toothed and not white.

Albert the Great wrote that wisdom and understanding enhance one's faith in God. According to him, these are the tools that God uses to commune with a contemplative. Love in the soul is both the cause and result of true understanding and judgement. It causes not only an intellectual knowledge of God, but a spiritual and emotional knowledge as well. Contemplation is the means whereby one can obtain this goal of understanding. Things that once seemed static and unchanging become full of possibility and perfection. The contemplative then knows that God is, but they do not know what God is. Thus, contemplation forever produces a mystified, imperfect knowledge of God. The soul is exalted beyond the rest of God's creation but it cannot see God himself.

==== Rhineland mysticism ====
Mysticism in the Rhineland emerged from a series of crises—political, social (the Black Death and its consequences), and religious. The writings of Albertus Magnus made a significant contribution to German mysticism, which became vibrant in the minds of the Beguines and women such as Hildegard of Bingen and Mechthild of Magdeburg.

In Europe, it was often the female members of the order, such as Catherine of Siena, Mechthild of Magdeburg, Christine of Stommeln, Margaret Ebner, and Elsbet Stagl, who gained reputations for having mystical experiences. Notable male members of the order associated with mysticism include Henry Suso and Johannes Tauler.

One of Meister Eckhart's themes is that one should be mindful of the great nobility which God has given the soul.

==== English Dominican mysticism ====
By 1300, the enthusiasm for preaching and conversion within the order had lessened. Mysticism, full of the ideas Albertus Magnus expostulated, became the devotion of the greatest minds and hands within the organization. It became a "powerful instrument of personal and theological transformation both within the Order of Preachers and throughout the wider reaches of Christendom. (Note: Albertus Magnus helped shape English Dominican thought through his idea that God is knowable, but obscure. Additionally, the English friars shared his belief that wisdom and understanding enhance one's faith in God. The English Dominicans also studied classical writers. This was also part of his legacy.) Although Albertus Magnus did much to instill mysticism in the Order of Preachers, it is a concept that reaches back to the Hebrew Bible. In the tradition of Holy Writ, the impossibility of coming face to face with God is a recurring motif. As time passed, Jewish and early Christian writings presented the idea of "unknowing" in which God's presence was enveloped in a dark cloud. All of those ideas associated with mysticism were at play in the spirituality of the Dominican community.

English Dominican mysticism in the late medieval period differed from European strands of it in that, whereas European Dominican mysticism tended to concentrate on ecstatic experiences of union with the divine, English Dominican mysticism's ultimate focus was on a crucial dynamic in one's personal relationship with God. That was an essential moral imitation of the Savior as an ideal for religious change and as the means for reformation of humanity's nature as an image of divinity. This type of mysticism carried with it four elements. Firstly, spiritually it emulated the moral essence of Christ's life. Secondly, there was a connection linking moral emulation of Christ's life and humanity's disposition as images of the divine. Thirdly, English Dominican mysticism focused on an embodied spirituality with a structured love of fellow men at its center. Finally, the supreme aspiration of this mysticism was either an ethical or an actual union with God.

For English Dominican mystics, the mystical experience was not expressed just in one moment of the full knowledge of God but in the journey of or process of faith. That then led to an understanding that was directed toward an experiential knowledge of divinity. However, for these mystics it was possible to pursue mystical life without the visions and voices that are usually associated with such a relationship with God.

The centre of all mystical experience is of course Christ. English Dominicans sought to gain a full knowledge of Christ through an imitation of his life. English mystics of all types tended to focus on the moral values that the events in Christ's life exemplified. That led to a "progressive understanding of the meanings of Scripture—literal, moral, allegorical, and anagogical," which was contained within the mystical journey itself. From these considerations of Scripture comes the simplest way to imitate Christ: an emulation of the moral actions and attitudes that Jesus demonstrated in his earthly ministry becomes the most significant way to feel and have knowledge of God.

The English concentrated on the spirit of the events of Christ's life. They neither expected nor sought the appearance of the stigmata or any other physical manifestation. They wanted to create in themselves that environment that allowed Jesus to fulfill his divine mission, insofar as they were able. At the centre of that environment was love, which Christ showed for humanity in becoming human. Christ's love reveals the mercy of God and his care for his creation. English Dominican mystics sought through that love to become images of God. English Dominican spirituality concentrated on the moral implications of image-bearing. Love led to spiritual growth that, in turn, reflected an increase in love for God and humanity.

=== Theological tradition ===
Since the 13th century, the Dominicans have maintained a continuous tradition of Thomism, a system of scholastic theology informed by the writings of Thomas Aquinas. J. A. Weisheipl emphasizes that within the order the history of Thomism has been continuous since the time of Aquinas:

Thomism was always alive in the Dominican Order, small as it was after the ravages of the Reformation, the French Revolution, and the Napoleonic occupation. Repeated legislation of the General Chapters, beginning after the death of St. Thomas, as well as the Constitutions of the Order, required all Dominicans to teach the doctrine of St. Thomas both in philosophy and in theology.

=== Devotion to Mary ===
Devotion to the Virgin Mary was another very important aspect of Dominican spirituality. As an order, the Dominicans believed that they were established through the good graces of Christ's mother, and through prayers, she sent missionaries to save the souls of nonbelievers. Dominican brothers and sisters unable to participate in the Divine Office sang the Little Office of the Blessed Virgin Mary each day and saluted her as their advocate.

Throughout the centuries, the Holy Rosary has been an important element among the Dominicans. Pope Pius XI stated: "The Rosary of Mary is the principle and foundation on which the very Order of Saint Dominic rests for making perfect the life of its members and obtaining the salvation of others." Histories of the Holy Rosary often attribute its origin to Dominic himself through the Virgin Mary. Our Lady of the Rosary is the title related to the Marian apparition to Dominic in 1208 in the church of Prouille in which the Virgin Mary gave the Rosary to him. For centuries, Dominicans have been instrumental in spreading the rosary and emphasizing the Catholic belief in the power of the rosary.

On January 1, 2008, the master of the order declared a year of dedication to the Rosary.

== Other names ==
A number of other names have been used to refer to both the order and its members.

- In England and other countries, the Dominican friars are referred to as Black Friars because of the black cappa or cloak they wear over their white habits. Dominicans were "Blackfriars", as opposed to "Whitefriars" (i.e., Carmelites) or "Greyfriars" (i.e., Franciscans). They are also distinct from the "Austin friars" (i.e., Augustinian Friars) who wear a similar habit.
- In France, the Dominicans were known as Jacobins because their convent in Paris was attached to the Church of Saint-Jacques, now demolished, on the way to Saint-Jacques-du-Haut-Pas, which belonged to the Italian Order of Saint James of Altopascio (James the Less) Sanctus Iacobus in Latin.
- Their identification as Dominicans gave rise to the pun that they were the Domini canes, or "Hounds of the Lord".

== Mottoes ==
Laudare, benedicere, praedicare
To praise, to bless and to preach (from the Dominican Missal, Preface of the Blessed Virgin Mary)
Veritas
Truth
Contemplare et contemplata aliis tradere
To study and to hand on the fruits of study (or, to contemplate and to hand on the fruits of contemplation)
One in faith, hope, and love

== Notable members ==
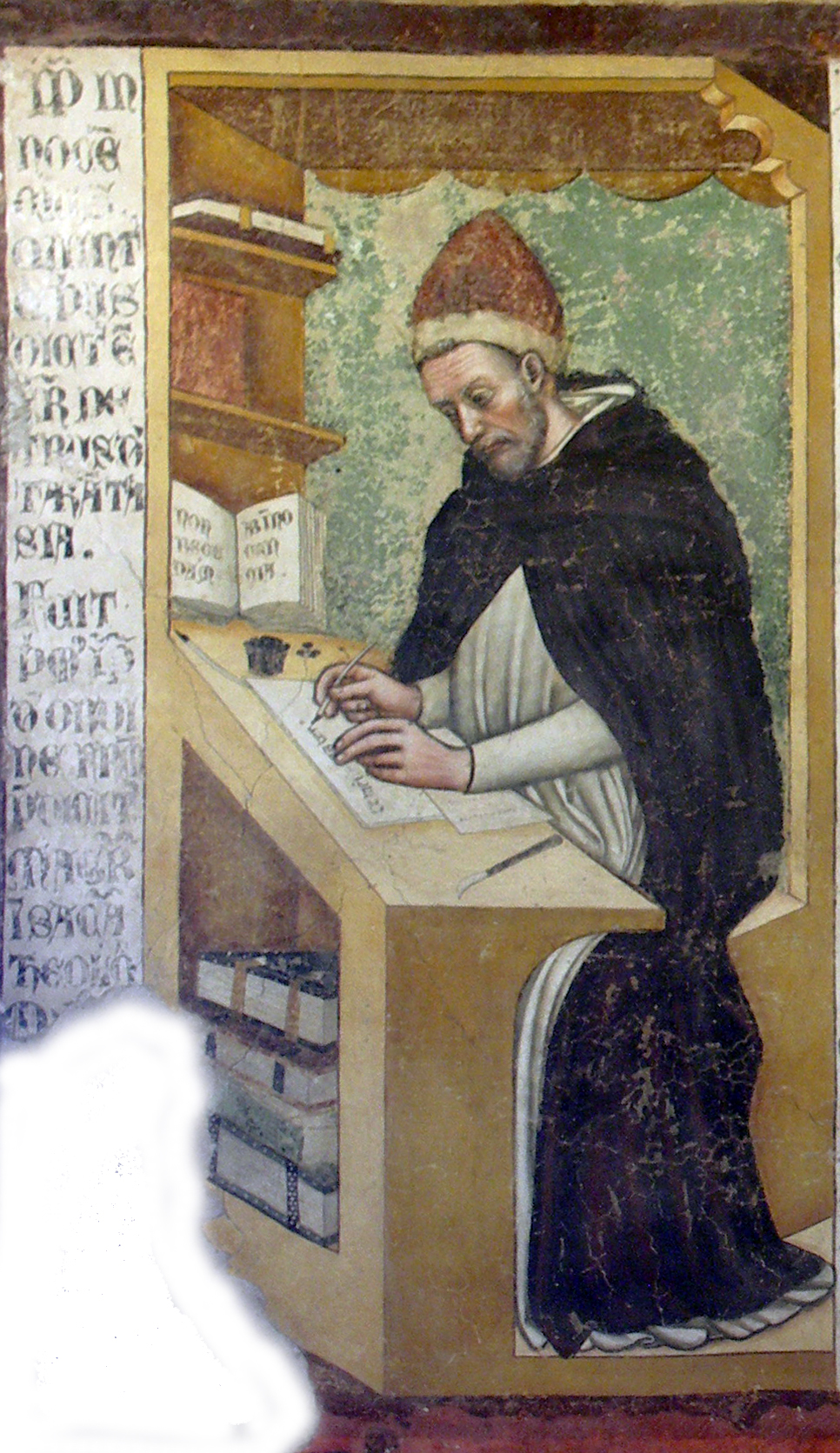
Pope Innocent V depicted in a 1350s fresco by Tommaso da Modena, in Treviso

=== Dominican popes and cardinals ===
Four Dominican friars have served as bishop of Rome:

- Pope Innocent V (r. 1276)
- Pope Benedict XI (r. 1303–04)
- Pope Pius V (r. 1566–72)
- Pope Benedict XIII (r. 1724–30)

==== First elected cardinal ====
- Hugh of Saint-Cher (elected 1244), first Dominican cardinal

There are currently five Dominican friars, and one member of the priestly fraternity in the College of Cardinals:

- Christoph Schönborn (b. 1945), Austrian, Archbishop of Vienna
- Jose Advincula Jr. (b. 1952), Filipino, Archbishop of Manila
- Jean-Paul Vesco (b. 1962), French, Archbishop of Algiers
- Frank Leo (b. 1971), Canadian, Archbishop of Toronto - Member of Priestly Fraternity
- Timothy Radcliffe (b. 1945), British, 85th Master Emeritus of the Order of Preachers

=== Other Dominicans ===
Other notable Dominicans include:

- Fra Angelico (1395–1455), painter
- Thomas Aquinas (c. 1225–1274), doctor of the Church
- Teodoro Bacani Jr. (b. 1947), Bishop of Novaliches
- Matteo Bandello (c. 1480–1562), author of novellas and soldier
- Gabriel Barletta (fl. 15th century), renowned preacher
- Fra Bartolomeo (1472–1517), Italian Renaissance painter
- Rodolfo Fontiveros Beltran (1948–2017), Bishop of San Fernando de La Union
- Frei Betto (b. 1945), Brazilian friar, theologian, political activist and former government adviser
- Giordano Bruno (1548–1600), philosopher and astronomer; condemned as a heretic and burned in Rome by the Inquisition
- Martin Bucer (1491–1551), German friar who left the order to join the Protestant Reformation
- Edward Ambrose Burgis (c. 1673–1747), historian and theologian
- Elias Bruneti of Bergerac (fl. 13th century), theologian
- Anne Buttimer (1938–2017), University College Dublin
- Thomas Cajetan (1469–1534), theologian, philosopher, and cardinal, who famously debated Martin Luther
- Tommaso Campanella (1568–1639), philosopher, theologian, astrologer, and poet; denounced by the Inquisition
- Melchor Cano (1509–1560), Spanish theologian of the School of Salamanca
- Oliviero Carafa (1430–1511), Italian cardinal and diplomat
- Christopher Cardone (b. 1957), Archbishop of the Archdiocese of Honiara
- Diego Carranza (b. 1559), Mexican missionary
- Bartolomé de las Casas (1484–1566), Spanish bishop in the West, known as the Protector of the Indians
- Marie-Dominique Chenu (1895–1990), French theologian of the Nouvelle Théologie
- Richard Luke Concanen (1747–1810), first Bishop of New York
- Yves Congar (1904–1995), French theologian of the Nouvelle Théologie, later cardinal
- Conradin of Bornada (d. 1429), renowned preacher
- Brian Davies (b. 1951), distinguished Professor of Philosophy, Fordham University; former regent of Blackfriars, Oxford
- Domingo de Soto (1494–1546), Spanish theologian and philosopher of the School of Salamanca
- Jeanine Deckers (1933–1985), briefly famous Belgian singer-songwriter
- Dominik Duka (1943–2025), Czech cardinal
- Michel-Louis Guérard des Lauriers (1898–1988), French theologian, professor at the Pontifical Lateran University in Rome, advisor of Pope Pius XII on the dogma of the Assumption of Mary, author of the Thesis of Cassiciacum, Sedevacantist bishop
- Joseph Augustine Di Noia (b. 1943), American Theologian, Adjunct Secretary of the Congregation for the Doctrine of the Faith
- Meister Eckhart (c. 1260-c. 1328), German mystic and preacher
- Nicholas Eymerich (c. 1316–1399), Inquisitor General of the Crown of Aragon and theologian
- Anthony Fisher (b. 1960), Archbishop of Sydney
- Réginald Marie Garrigou-Lagrange (1877–1964), leading 20th-century Thomist
- Bernard Gui (1261–1331), French bishop and inquisitor of the Cathars
- Gustavo Gutierrez (1928–2024), Peruvian liberation theologian
- Jean Jérôme Hamer (1916–1996), Belgian theologian and Curia official, cardinal
- Simon Henton (fl. c. 1248–1262), English Dominican provincial and biblical commentator
- Henrik Kalteisen (c. 1390–1464), 24th Archbishop of Nidaros
- Hermann of Minden, 13th-century provincial superior of the German province of Dominicans
- James of Lausanne (d. 1321), superior of the order in France
- Robert Kilwardby (c. 1215–1279), Archbishop of Canterbury and cardinal
- Heinrich Kramer (1430–1505), German author of the Malleus Maleficarum, a handbook for witch hunting
- Jean-Baptiste Henri Lacordaire (1802–1861), French theologian, journalist, and political activist
- Osmund Lewry (1929–1987), English theologian
- Jacques Loew (1908–1999), French worker-priest
- Patricia Madigan (b. 1950), Australian religious sister; member and leader of the Dominican Sisters of Eastern Australia and the Solomon Islands; executive director of the Dominican Centre for Interfaith Ministry Education and Research (CIMER)
- Herbert McCabe (1926–2001), English theologian and scholar
- Malcolm McMahon (b. 1949), Archbishop of Liverpool
- Vincent McNabb (1868–1943), Irish scholar, apologist and ecumenist
- Aidan Nichols (b. 1948), English theologian
- Flannery O'Connor, American author, Dominican tertiary laywoman
- José S. Palma (b. 1950), Archbishop of Cebu
- Marco Pellegrini (fl.1500), Vicar-General of the Dominicans in Lombardy
- Dominique Pire (George) (1910–1969), recipient of the Nobel Peace Prize
- Girolamo Savonarola (1452–1498), Italian orator, de facto ruler of Florentine Republic after the overthrow of the Medici family, burned by the Inquisition
- Edward Schillebeeckx (1914–1998), Belgian theologian
- E. Anne Schwerdtfeger (1930–2008), American composer
- Rufino Sescon Jr. (b. 1972), Bishop of Balanga
- Napoleon Sipalay Jr. (b. 1970), Bishop of Alaminos
- Allesandro della Spina (born 13th century-died 1313), credited with the invention of spectacles
- John Tauler (c. 1300–1361), one of the Rhineland Mystics
- Johann Tetzel (c. 1465–1519), Inquisitor for Poland and Saxony, renowned preacher and indulgence seller
- Socrates Villegas (b. 1960), Archbishop of Lingayen-Dagupan
- Vincent of Beauvais (c. 1184-c. 1264), author/compiler of the encyclopedic text The Great Mirror (Speculum Maius)
- Francisco de Vitoria (c. 1483–1546), Spanish philosopher and theologian of the School of Salamanca, renowned for his work in international law
- Bruno Grego Santos (b. 1985), Tertiary Dominican, Brazilian lawyer, canonist and academic, Full Professor by the Pontifical Catholic University of Parana and Philosophiae Doctor by the Law School of the University of São Paulo

== Educational institutions ==
- Albertus Magnus College, New Haven, Connecticut, United States – est.1925
- Angelicum School Iloilo, Iloilo City, Philippines – est. 1978
- Aquinas College, Grand Rapids, Michigan, United States – est. 1886
- Aquinas Institute of Theology, St. Louis, Missouri, United States – est. 1939
- Aquinas School, San Juan City, Philippines – est. 1965
- Barry University, Miami Shores, Florida, United States – est. 1940
- Bishop Lynch High School, Dallas, Texas, United States – est. 1963
- Blackfriars Hall, Oxford, United Kingdom
- Blackfriars Priory School, Prospect, South Australia – est. 1953
- Blessed Imelda's School, Taipei, Taiwan – est. 1916
- Cabra Dominican College, Adelaide, South Australia – est. 1886
- Caldwell University, Caldwell, New Jersey, United States – est. 1939
- Catholic Dominican School, Yigo, Guam – est. 1995
- Centro Universitario Cultural (Cultural Univeristary Center), Mexico City, Mexico – est. 1959
- Colegio de San Juan de Letran, Bataan, Abucay, Bataan, Philippines
- Colegio de San Juan de Letran, Calamba, Laguna, Philippines
- Colegio de San Juan de Letran, Intramuros, Manila – est. 1620
- Colegio de San Juan de Letran, Manaoag (formerly Our Lady of Manaoag College), Manaoag, Pangasinan, Philippines
- Colegio Lacordaire, Cali, Colombia – est. 1956
- Dominican College of San Juan, San Juan City, Philippines
- Dominican Convent, Ballyfermot, Dublin. Ireland
- Dominican College of Santa Rosa, Santa Rosa, Laguna, Philippines – est. 1994
- Dominican College of Tarlac, Capas, Tarlac, Philippines – est. 1947
- Dominican Convent High School, Bulawayo, Bulawayo, Zimbabwe – est. 1956
- Dominican Convent High School, Harare, Zimbabwe – est. 1892
- Dominican International School Kaohsiung, Taiwan – est. 1953
- Dominican International School, Taipei City, Taiwan – est. 1957
- Dominican School, Semaphore, South Australia – est. 1899
- Dominican School Manila, Sampaloc, Manila, Philippines – est. 1958
- Dominican School of Calabanga, Calabanga, Metro Naga, Camarines Sur, Philippines
- Dominican School of Philosophy and Theology, Berkeley, California, United States – est. 1861
- Dominican University, River Forest, Illinois, United States – est. 1901
- Dominican University College, Ottawa, Ontario, Canada – est. 1900
- Dominican University of California, San Rafael, California, United States – est. 1890
- Domuni Universitas, Toulouse, France, France – est. 1998
- Edgewood College, Madison, Wisconsin, United States – est. 1927
- Emerald Hill School, Zimbabwe, Harare, Zimbabwe
- Fenwick High School, Oak Park, Illinois, United States – est. 1929
- Frassati Catholic High School, Spring, Texas, United States – est. 2013
- Holy Cross College, Arima, Trinidad & Tobago- est. 1957
- Holy Rosary School of Pardo, El Pardo, Cebu Ciyy, Philippines – est. 1965
- Holy Trinity University, Puerto Princesa City, Philippines – est. 1940
- Marian Catholic High School, Chicago Heights, Illinois, United States – est. 1958
- Molloy University, Rockville Centre, New York, United States – est. 1955
- Mount Saint Mary College, Newburgh, New York, United States
- Newbridge College, Newbridge, Co. Kildare, Ireland
- Ohio Dominican University, Columbus, Ohio, United States
- Pontifical Faculty of the Immaculate Conception
- The Pontifical and Royal University of Santo Tomas, Manila
- Pontifical University of Saint Thomas Aquinas
- Providence College, Providence, Rhode Island, United States
- Rosaryhill School, Hong Kong, China – 1959–2024
- San Pedro College, Davao City
- Santa Sabina Dominican College, Dublin
- Siena College, Camberwell, Victoria, Australia
- Siena College of Quezon City
- Siena College of San Jose
- Siena College of Taytay, Taytay, Rizal
- St Agnes Academy, Houston, Texas, United States – est. 1905
- St. Catharine College, St. Catharine, Kentucky, United States
- St Dominic's Chishawasha, Zimbabwe
- St Dominic's College, Henderson, Auckland, New Zealand
- St Dominic's College, Wanganui, New Zealand
- St Dominic's Priory College, North Adelaide, South Australia – est. 1884
- St. John's High School, Zimbabwe
- St Mary's College, Adelaide, South Australia – est. 1869
- St. Mary's Dominican High School, New Orleans, Louisiana, United States
- St. Michael Academy, Northern Samar, Philippines
- St. Rose of Lima School, Bacolod City, Philippines
- Superior Institute of Religious Sciences of St. Thomas Aquinas
- Universidad Santo Tomas de Aquino, Bogota, Colombia
- Universidad Santo Tomas de Aquino, Santo Domingo, Dominican Republic, est. 1538 – First University of the New World
- University of Santo Tomas-Legazpi (formerly Aquinas University of Legazpi), Legazpi City, Albay – est. 1948
- UST-Angelicum College (formerly Angelicum College), Quezon City, Philippines – est. 1972

== See also ==
- Anglican Order of Preachers
- The Blackfriars of Shrewsbury
- Community of the Lamb, a new branch of the Dominican Order, founded in 1983
- Dominican Nuns of the Perpetual Rosary
- Dominican Rite, the Separate Use for Dominicans in the Latin Church
- Dominican Sisters of Mary, Mother of the Eucharist
- Dominican Sisters of St. Cecilia
- Jacobins Convent, Nantes
- List of saints of the Dominican Order
- List of sites of the Dominican Order
- Master of the Order of Preachers
- Order of the Blessed Sacrament
- Spanish Inquisition
- Third Order of Saint Dominic
- Thomistic sacramental theology
- Thought of Thomas Aquinas
