= Chronological list of saints and blesseds in the 17th century =

A list of people, who died during the 17th century, who have received recognition as Blessed (through beatification) or Saint (through canonization) from the Catholic Church:

Name	Birth	Birthplace	Death	Place of death	Notes
Anne Line			1601		
Germaine Cousin	1579		1601		
Blessed John Pibush			1601		
Blessed Mark Barkworth	1572		1601		
Blessed Robert Middleton	1571		1601		
Blessed Roger Filcock	1570		1601		
Blessed Andrew Hibernon	1534		1602		
Blessed Dominic Collins	1566		1602		
Blessed Francis Page			1602		
Blessed James Duckett			1602		
Blessed Robert Watkinson	1579		1602		
Blessed William Richardson (Anderson)			1603		
Seraphino	1540		1604		
Blessed Gaspar de Bono	1530		1604		
Blessed Juvenal Ancina	1545		1604		
Blessed Thomas Welbourne			1605		
Blessed William Browne			1605		
Nicholas Owen			1606		
Turibius Alfonso of Mogrovejo	1538		1606		
Blessed Edward Oldcorne	1561		1606		
Blessed Julian of Saint Augustine			1606		
Blessed Ralph Ashley			1606		
Mary Magdalene de Pazzi	1566		1607		
Blessed Robert Drury	1567		1607		
Andrew Avellino	1521		1608		
Francis Caracciolo	1563		1608		
Thomas Garnet	1575		1608		
Blessed George Gervase	1569		1608		
Blessed Matthew Flathers	1580		1608		
John Leonardi	1541		1609		
Francis Solano	1549		1610		
John Roberts	1577		1610		
Blessed Roger Cadwallador	1565		1610		
Blessed Thomas Somers			1610		
John de Ribera	1532		1611		
John Almond			1612		
Joseph of Leonissa			1612		
Blessed Conor O'Devany	1533		1612		Bishop of Down
Blessed Joseph of Leonissa	1556		1612		
Blessed Patrick O'Loughran			1612		
Blessed Richard Newport			1612		
Blessed William Scott			1612		
Juan Bautista of the Conception (Juan Garcia Gijon)	1561		1613		
Blessed Regina Prottman	1552		1613		
Camillus de Lellis			1614		
Blessed Dom Justo Takayama	c. 1552/1553	Haibara, Nara	1615	Manila, Philippines	
John Ogilvie	1580		1615		
Bernardino Realino	1530		1616		
Blessed Sebastian Montano			1616		
Blessed Thomas Atkinson	1546		1616		
Blessed Thomas Maxfield	1590		1616		
Blessed Thomas Tunstal			1616		
Blesseds John Thules and Roger Wrenno	1568		1616		
Alphonsus Rodriguez	1531		1617		
John Baptist Machado	1580		1617		
Leo Tanaka			1617		
Rose of Lima	1586		1617		
Blessed Alphonsus Navarette			1617		
Blessed Andrew Sushinda			1617		
Blessed Caspar Hikojiro and Andrew Yoshida			1617		
Blessed Ferdinand Ayala			1617		
Blessed Peter of the Assumption (Peter of Cuerva)			1617		
Blessed Leo Tanaca			1617		
Blessed Maria Victoria of Fornari-Strata	1562		1617		
Blessed John of Saint Martha	1578		1618		
Blessed William Southerne	1579		1618		
Lawrence of Brindisi	1559		1619		
Blessed Alexius Nakamura			1619		
Blessed Andrew Tokuan			1619		
Blessed Anthony Kimura			1619		
Blessed Bartholomew Sheki			1619		
Blessed Dominic Jories			1619		
Blessed Hippolytus Galantini	1565		1619		
Blessed John Ivanango and John Montajana			1619		
Blessed John Shoun			1619		
Blessed Leo Nakanishi			1619		
Blessed Leonard Kimura and Companions			1619		
Blessed Matthias Kosaka and Matthias Nakano			1619		
Blessed Michael Takeshita	1594		1619		
Blessed Michael Takexitasa Canghai			1619		
Blessed Romanus			1619		
Blessed Thomas Kotenda and Companions			1619		
Blesseds Mary Tokuan and Mary Choun			1619		
John Sarkander	1576	Skoczów, Poland	1620	Olomouc, Czech Republic	Martyr, priest
Blessed Ambrose Fernandez	1551		1620		
Blessed James Guengoro			1620		
Blessed Mary Guengoro			1620		
Blessed Mary Magdalen Kiota			1620		
Blessed Matthias of Arima	1571		1620		
Blessed Simon Kiyota Bokusai and Companions			1620		
Blessed Thomas Guengoro			1620		
John Berchmans	1599		1621		
Robert Bellarmine	1542		1621		Cardinal and Bishop of Capua
Blessed Francis Taylor (Tailler)			1621		
Dominic Shamada			1622		
Fidelis of Sigmaringen	1577		1622		
Francis de Morales			1622		
Francis de Sales	1567		1622		Bishop of Geneva
Francis of St. Bonaventure			1622		
Joseph of St. Hyacinth			1622		
Leo Satsuma			1622		
Peter Paul of St. Claire			1622		
Blessed Agnes Takea			1622		
Blessed Agnes Tsao-Kouy			1622		
Blessed Alexius			1622		
Blessed Alphonsus de Mena			1622		
Blessed Angelus Orsucci			1622		
Blessed Anthony Kiun			1622		
Blessed Anthony of Korea			1622		
Blessed Anthony Sanga			1622		
Blessed Anthony Vom			1622		
Blessed Apollinaris Franco			1622		
Blessed Augustine Ota	1570		1622		
Blessed Bartholomew Monfiore			1622		
Blessed Bartholomew Shikiemon			1622		
Blessed Camillus Constanzi	1572		1622		
Blessed Caspar Kotenda			1622		
Blessed Charles Spinola	1564		1622		
Blessed Damien Yamiki			1622		
Blessed Dionysius Fugishima			1622		
Blessed Dominic Nakano			1622		
Blessed Dominic of Fiunga			1622		
Blessed Dominic of the Holy Rosary			1622		
Blessed Francis Chakichi			1622		
Blessed Francis Takea			1622		
Blessed Gundislavus Fusai			1622		
Blessed Hyacinth Orfanel			1622		
Blessed James Denshi			1622		
Blessed John Inamura			1622		
Blessed John Kingoku			1622		
Blessed John of Korea			1622		
Blessed Lawrence Rokuyemon			1622		
Blessed Leo Suchiemon			1622		
Blessed Louis Chakichi			1622		
Blessed Louis Flores			1622		
Blessed Louis Kawara			1622		
Blessed Lucy Chakichi			1622		
Blessed Lucy de Freitas			1622		
Blessed Mancius of St. Thomas			1622		
Blessed Mary Tanaura			1622		
Blessed Matthias of Arima			1622		
Blessed Michael Diaz			1622		
Blessed Michael Shumpo			1622		
Blessed Michael Yamiki			1622		
Blessed Paul Navarro			1622		
Blessed Paul Sanchiki			1622		
Blessed Paul Tanaka			1622		
Blessed Peter Ikiemon			1622		
Blessed Peter Nangashi			1622		
Blessed Peter of Avila	1562		1622		
Blessed Peter Onizuko			1622		
Blessed Peter Sampo			1622		
Blessed Peter Sanga			1622		
Blessed Peter Shichiyemon			1622		
Blessed Peter Zuniga			1622		
Blessed Richard of St. Ann			1622		
Blessed Sebastian Kimura			1622		
Blessed Thecla Nangashi			1622		
Blessed Thomas Akafuji			1622		
Blessed Thomas Koyanangi			1622		
Blessed Thomas of the Holy Rosary			1622		
Blessed Thomas of the Holy Spirit			1622		
Blessed Thomas Sherwood			1622		
Blessed Thomas of Zumárraga			1622		
Blesseds Apollinaris Franco and companions			1622		
Blesseds Louis			1622		
Francis Galvez			1623		
Josaphat Kuntsevych	1580		1623		Bishop of Polotsk
Blessed Jerome de Angelis	1568		1623		
Blessed Simon Yempo	1580		1623		
Simón de Rojas	1552	Valladolid, Spain	1624	Madrid, Spain	
Blessed Cajus	1571		1624		
Blessed Didacus Carvalho			1624		
Blessed Louis Baba			1624		
Blessed Louis Sasanda			1624		
Blessed Louis Sotelo			1624		
Blessed Michael Carvalho	1577		1624		
Blessed Peter Vasquez			1624		
Michael de Sanctis	1591		1625		
Blessed Benedict of Urbino			1625		
Blessed Jeremy of Valacchia	1556		1625		
Francis Pacheco			1626		
Vincent Kaun			1626		
Blessed Anne of Saint Bartholomew	1549		1626		
Blessed Balthasar de Torres			1626		
Blessed Caspar Sadamazu			1626		
Blessed Francis Pacheco	1565		1626		
Blessed John Baptist Zola			1626		
Blessed John Kinsako			1626		
Blessed John Naisen			1626		
Blessed John Tanaka			1626		
Blessed Louis Onizuka Naisen			1626		
Blessed Matthias Araki			1626		
Blessed Michael Tozo			1626		
Blessed Monica Naisen			1626		
Blessed Paul Shinsuki			1626		
Blessed Peter Rinshei	1589		1626		
Blesseds Peter and Susanna Araki Chobyoye (husband and wife)			1626		
Francis Bizzocca			1627		
Francis of St. Mary			1627		
Gaius of Korea			1627		
Luke Kiemon			1627		
Blessed Bartholomew Laurel			1627		
Blessed Caspar and Mary Vaz			1627		
Blessed Francis Kuloi			1627		
Blessed Francis Pinzokere			1627		
Blessed John Maid			1627		
Louis Beltran (Bertrand) and Companions			1627		
Blessed Louis Maki			1627		
Blessed Louis Someyon			1627		
Blessed Martin Gomez			1627		
Blessed Michael Kiraiemon			1627		
Blessed Thomas Tsughi			1627		
Blessed Thomas Tsuji	1571		1627		
Blessed Thomas Vinyemon			1627		
Blessed Francis of Saint Mary			1627		
Edmund Arrowsmith	1585		1628		
Louis of Omura			1628		
Paul Aybara			1628		
Roch Gonzalez	1576		1628		
Romanus Aybara			1628		
Blessed Anthony of St. Bonaventure	1588		1628		
Blessed Anthony of Tuy			1628		
Blessed Dominic Nifaki			1628		
Blessed Dominic of Nagasaki			1628		
Blessed Dominic Shibioge			1628		
Blessed Dominic Tomaki			1628		
Blessed James Fayashida			1628		
Blessed John Tomaki			1628		
Blessed Lawrence Jamada			1628		
Blessed Leo Kombiogi			1628		
Blessed Louis Nifaki			1628		
Blessed Matthew Alvarez			1628		
Blessed Michael Fimonaya			1628		
Blessed Michael Jamada			1628		
Blessed Michael Nakeshima			1628		
Blessed Michael Tomaki			1628		
Blessed Paul Fimonaya			1628		
Blessed Paul Tomaki			1628		
Blessed Richard Herst (Hurst)			1628		
Blessed Thomas of St. Hyacinth			1628		
Blessed Thomas Tomaki			1628		
Blesseds John of Castille			1628		
Blessed Peter of the Holy Mother of God			1629		
John Kokumbuko			1630		
Blessed Lawrence Shizu			1630		
Blessed Mancius Shisisoiemon			1630		
Blessed Michael Kinoshi			1630		
Blessed Peter Kufioji			1630		
Blessed Thomas Kufioji			1630		
Blessed John of Prado	1563		1631		
Blessed Liborius Wagner	1593		1631		
Anthony Ishida	1570		1632	Nagasaki	
Blessed Bartholomew Gutierrez			1632		
Blessed Gabriel of St. Magdalen			1632		
Blesseds Martin Lumbreras and Melchior Sanchez			1632		
Dominic Ibanez de Erquicia	1589		1633		
James Kyushei Tomonaga			1633		
Lucas Alonso Gorda and Matthew Kohioye			1633		
Michael Kurobioye			1633		
Hyacinth Jordan Ansalone	1598		1634		
Lorenzo Ruiz and Companions	1600	Manila, Philippines	1637	Nagasaki, Japan	
Blessed Agnes Galand (Agnès de Jésus)	1602		1634		
John del Prado			1636		
Humilis of Bisignano	1582		1637		O.F.M.
Blesseds Agathangelo (Noury) and Cassian			1637		
Blessed Denis of the Nativity	1600	Honfleur, France	1638	Malay	
Blessed Redemptus of the Cross	1598	Paredes de Coura, Portugal	1638	Malay	
Martin de Porres	1579		1639		
Hyacintha Mariscotti	1585		1640		
John Francis Regis	1597		1640		
Peter Fourier	1565		1640		
Blessed Maria of Jesus	1560		1640		
Ambrose Edward Barlow	1585		1641		
Jane Frances de Chantal	1562		1641		
Blessed William Ward	1568		1641		
Alban Bartholomew Roe	1583		1642		
Peter Higgins	1601		1642		
Blessed Edmund Catheriek			1642		
Blessed Hugh Green	1584		1642		
Blessed John Baptist Bullaker	1603		1642		
Blessed John Lockwood (John Lascelles)			1642		
René Goupil	1608	Anjou, France	1642	North America	Martyred by Amerindians
Blessed Thomas Holland	1600		1642		
Blessed Thomas Reynolds			1642		
Blessed Arthur Francis Bell	1590		1643		
Blessed Henry Heath	1599		1643		
Blessed Andrew of Phu Yen	1625		1644		
Blessed John Duckett	1613		1644		
Blessed Ralph Corby (Ralph Corbington)	1598		1644		
John de Massias	1585		1645		
Blessed Alexander of Lugo			1645		
Blessed Ambrosio Francisco Ferro and companions			1645		
Blessed Andre de Soveral	1572		1645		
Blessed Henry Morse	1595		1645		
Mariana de Paredes	1618		1645		
Blessed Edward Bamber	1600		1646		
Blessed Philip Powell	1594		1646		
Jean de Lalande	unknown	France	1646	North America	Martyred by Amerindians
Isaac Jogues	1607	Orleans, France	1646	North America	Martyred by Amerindians
Blessed Pietro Casani	1572		1647		
Anthony Daniel	1601	France	1648	North America	Martyred by Amerindians
Joseph Calasanctius (Joseph Calasanz)	1556		1648		
Francisco Fernandez de Capillas	1607	Palencia, Spain	1648	Fujian, China	Missionary Martyr in China
Jean de Brébeuf	1593	Normandy,France	1649	North America	Martyred by Amerindians
Charles Garnier	1606	France	1649	North America	Martyred by Amerindians
Gabriel Lalemant	1610	France	1649	North America	Martyred by Amerindians
Noel Chabanel	1613	France	1649	North America	Martyred by Amerindians
Blessed Peter Wright	1603		1651		
Blessed Terence Albert O'Brien	1600		1651		
Blessed Virginia Centurione Bracelli	1587		1651		
Blessed John Kearney	1619		1653		
Blessed John Southworth	1592		1654		
Peter Claver	1581		1654		
Blessed William Tirry	1608		1654		
Andrew Bobola	1592		1657		
Blessed Alain de Solminihac	1593		1659		Bishop of Cahors
Louise de Marillac	1591		1660		
Vincent de Paul	1581		1660		
John Yano			1662		
Blessed John Foyamon			1662		
Blessed John Nangata			1662		
Joseph of Cupertino	1603		1663		
Blessed Maria Angela Astorch	1592		1665		
Peter of Saint Joseph Betancur	1626		1667		
Bernard of Corleone	1605	Corleone, Sicily	1667	Palermo, Sicily	Capuchin friar
Blessed Mary Catherine de Longpre	1632		1668		
Charles of Sezze	1616		1670		
Blessed Antonio Grassi	1592		1671		
Blessed Diego Luis de San Vitores	1627	Spain	1672	Tumon, Guam	
Pedro Calungsod	1654	Cebu, Philippines	1672	Tumon, Guam	
Blessed Edward Coleman			1678		
Blessed Nicolas Roland	1642		1678		
John Kemble	1599		1679		
John Wall			1679		
Blessed Anthony Turner			1679		
Blessed Bridget of Jesus Morello (Brigida di Gesù Morello)	1610		1679		
Blessed John Fenwick and John Gavan			1679		
Blessed John Grove			1679		
Blessed Nicholas Postgate	1597		1679		
Blessed Richard Langhorne			1679		
Blessed Thomas Pickering	1621		1679		
Blessed Thomas Whitbread			1679		
Blessed William Harcourt (William Barrows)			1679		
Blessed William Ireland (William Ironmonger)	1636		1679		
Blessed William John Plessington	1637		1679		
John Eudes	1601		1680		
Kateri Tekakwitha			1680		
Blessed Thomas Thwing	1635		1680		
Blessed William Howard, 1st Viscount Stafford	1614		1680	Tower Hill, London, England	
Oliver Plunkett	1629		1681		Primate of Ireland and martyr
Claude de la Colombiere	1641		1682		Jesuit priest
Blessed Julian Maunoir	1606		1683		
Blessed Bonaventure of Barcelona			1684		
Blessed Ana de los Angeles Monteagudo	1600		1686		
Blessed Nicolas Steno	1600		1686		
Blessed Innocent XI	1611		1689		Pope
Margaret Mary Alacoque	1647		1690		Visitandine nun and mystic
John de Britto	1647		1693		
Blessed Bernard of Offida	1604		1694		
David Lewis	1616		1697		Jesuit martyr
Gregory Barbarigo	1625		1697		Bishop of Bergamo
Marguerite Bourgeoys	1620		1700		Foundress
Blesseds Jacinto de los Angeles and Juan Bautista	1660		1700		

== See also ==
- Christianity in the 17th century
