= List of Dominican saints and beatified =

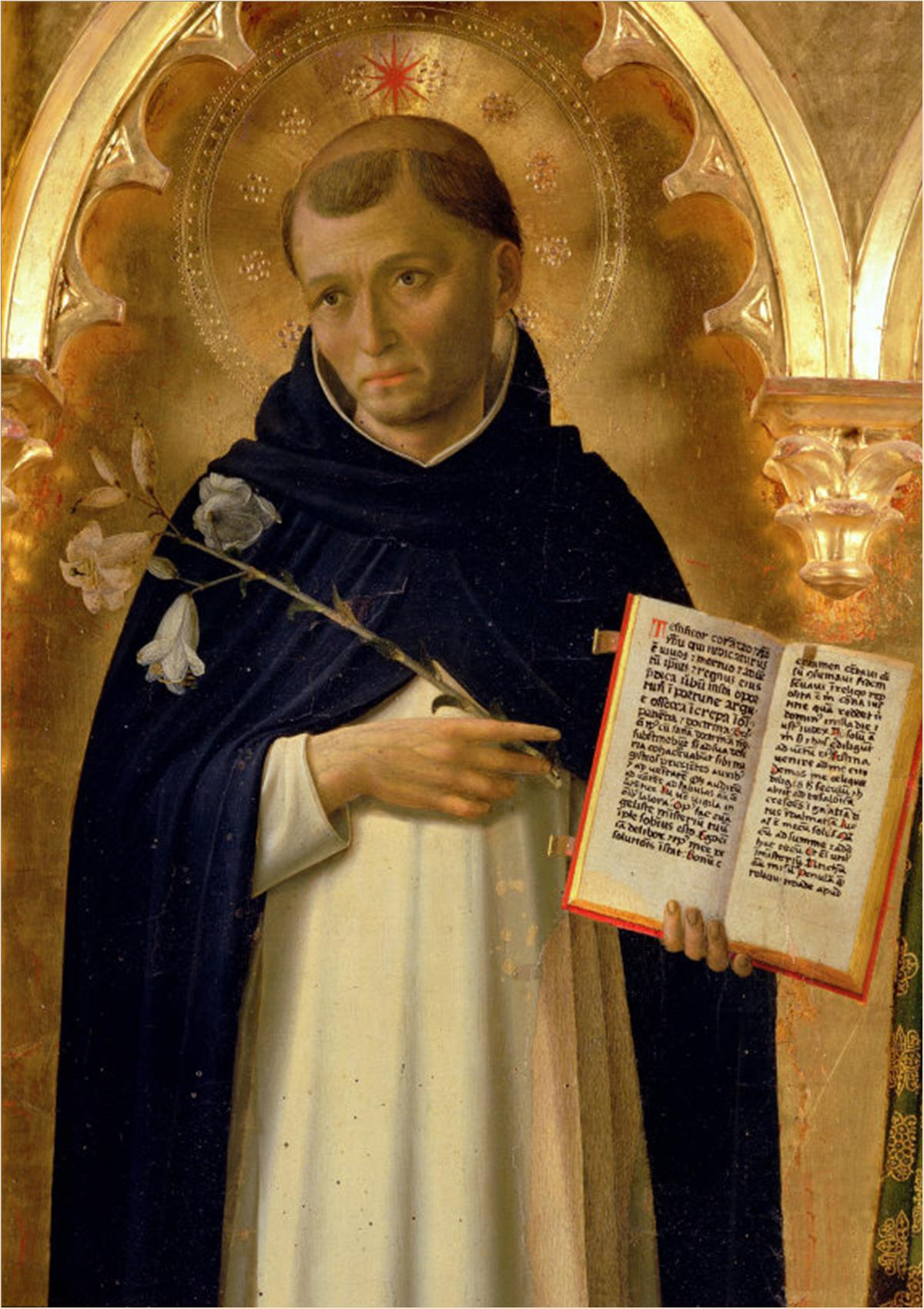
Dominic de Guzmán, recognized as a saint by the Catholic Church, founded the Dominican Order which was approved by Pope Innocent III in 1215.

This list of Dominican saints and beatified is alphabetical. It includes Dominican saints and blesseds from Europe, Asia, Africa and the Americas. Since the founder of the Dominicans, Dominic de Guzmán, was canonised in 1234, there have been 69 other Dominicans canonised and many more beatified.

== A ==
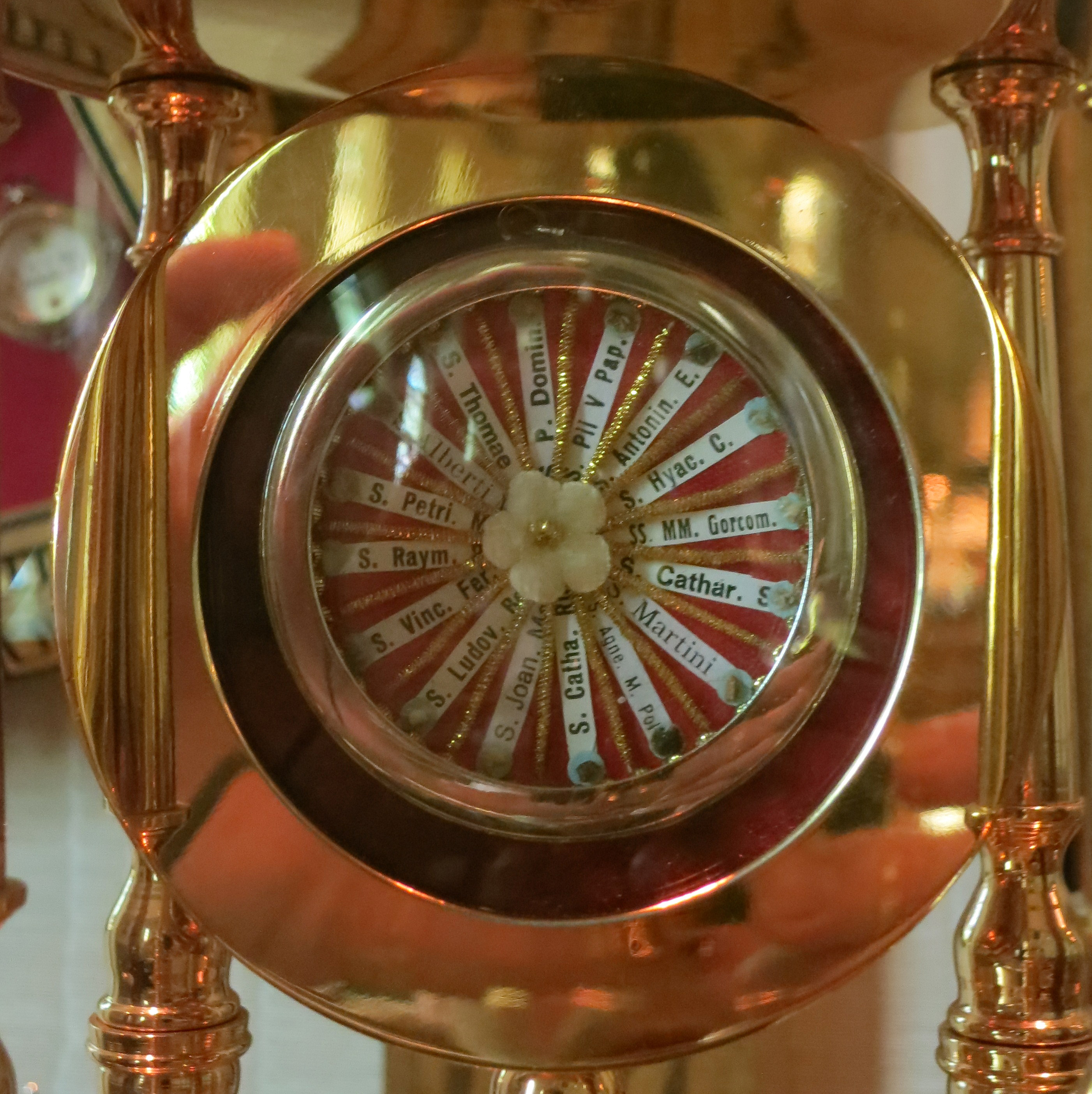
Relics of Dominican saints

- Agnes of Montepulciano (1268-1317), prioress in medieval Tuscany
- Alberto da Bergamo (1214-1279), Italian tertiary and farmer
- Albertus Magnus (before 1200–1280), German friar and bishop, Doctor of the Church
- John Alcober (1694-1748), Spanish priest, one of the Martyr Saints of China
- Pedro Almato (1830-1861), Spanish priest, one of the Vietnamese Martyrs
- Mateo Alonso de Leciniana (1702-1745), Spanish priest, one of the Vietnamese Martyrs
- Giordano Ansaloni (1598-1634), Italian friar, missionary to the Philippines and Japan, one of the 16 Martyrs of Japan
- Antoninus of Florence (1389-1459), Italian friar, archbishop of Florence
- Thomas Aquinas (1225-1274), Italian friar and philosopher, Doctor of the Church
- Joan of Aza (1140-1205), mother of Dominic de Guzmán

== B ==
- Bartholomew of Braga (1514-1590), Portuguese friar, archbishop of Braga
- Bartolo Longo (1841–1926), Married Layperson of the Diocese of Pompei; Member of the Lay Dominicans; Founder of the Dominican Sisters of Pompei (Italy)
- Zdislava Berka (c.1220-1252), Czech convent foundress, wife of Havel of Markvartice
- Louis Bertrand (1526-1581), Spanish friar, missionary to South America
- Lucy Brocadelli (1476-1544), mystic and sister of the Third Order
- Jose Gabriel del Rosario Brochero (1840-1914), Argentine priest, known as the "Gaucho priest"
- Dominic Bùi Van Úy (c.1801-1839), Vietnamese catechist, one of the Vietnamese Martyrs

== C ==
- Dominic Cẩm (-1859), Vietnamese priest, one of the Vietnamese Martyrs
- Matthew Carreri (1420-1470), Italian Friar, mystic, and stigmatic
- Francis Ferdinand de Capillas (1607-1648), Spanish friar, one of the Martyr Saints of China
- Jacinto Casteñeda (1743-1773), Spanish friar, one of the Vietnamese Martyrs
- Catherine of Racconigi (1486-1574), mystic and sister of the Third Order
- Catherine of Ricci (1522-1590), Italian nun, prioress of the Convent of St Vincent
- Catherine of Siena (1347-1380), tertiary from Siena, Doctor of the Church
- Clemente Ignacio Delgado Cebrian (1762-1838), Spanish friar, one of the Vietnamese Martyrs
- Columba of Rieti (1467-1501), mystic and sister of the Third Order
- Antonio della Chiesa (1394 - 1459), Italian priest, preacher and reformer
- Francisco Coll Guitart (1812-1875), Spanish priest, founder of the Dominican Sisters of the Annunciation of the Blessed Virgin
- Guillaume Courtet (1589-1637), French priest, missionary to Japan, one of the 16 Martyrs of Japan

== D ==
- Francis Diaz (1713-1748), Spanish priest, one of the Martyr Saints of China
- Thomas Đinh Viết Dụ (c.1783-1839), Vietnamese priest, one of the Vietnamese Martyrs
- Joseph Đỗ Quang Hiển (c.1765-1840), Vietnamese priest, one of the Vietnamese Martyrs
- Vincent Đỗ Yến (c.1764-1838), Vietnamese priest, one of the Vietnamese Martyrs
- Dominic de Guzmán (1170-1221), Spanish priest, founder of the Dominican Order
- John Dominici (c. 1355-1419), Italian cardinal, writer, and reformer

== E ==
- Domingo Ibáñez de Erquicia (c.1589-1633), Spanish friar, missionary to the Philippines and Japan, one of the 16 Martyrs of Japan.

== F ==
- Joseph Fernandez (1775-1838), Spanish priest, one of the Vietnamese Martyrs
- Vincent Ferrer (1350-1419), Valencian friar and preacher, missionary across Europe
- Adrian Fortescue (1476-1539), martyr of the Anglican Reformation
- Pier Giorgio Frassati (1901-1925), Third Order activist

== G ==
- Marie-Alphonsine Danil Ghattas (1843-1927), Palestinian nun, founder of the Dominican Sisters of the Most Holy Rosary of Jerusalem
- Francis Gil de Frederich (1702-1745), Spanish priest, missionary to the Philippines and Japan, one of the Vietnamese Martyrs
- Antonio Gonzalez (c.1593-1637), Spanish friar, missionary to the Philippines and Japan, one of the 16 Martyrs of Japan
- Luke Alonso Gorda (1594-1633), Spanish priest, missionary to the Philippines and Japan, one of the 16 Martyrs of Japan
- Gundisalvus of Amarante (1187-1259), Portuguese priest and hermit

== H ==
- Domingo Henares de Zafra Cubero (1765-1838), Spanish priest, one of the Vietnamese Martyrs
- Jeronimo Hermosilla (1800-1861), Spanish priest, one of the Vietnamese Martyrs
- Hyacinth of Poland (1185-1257), Polish priest and missionary, reformer of women's missionaries in Poland

== J ==
- Joanna, Princess of Portugal (1452-1490)
- John of Cologne (1500s-1572), Dutch friar, one of the Martyrs of Gorkum

== K ==
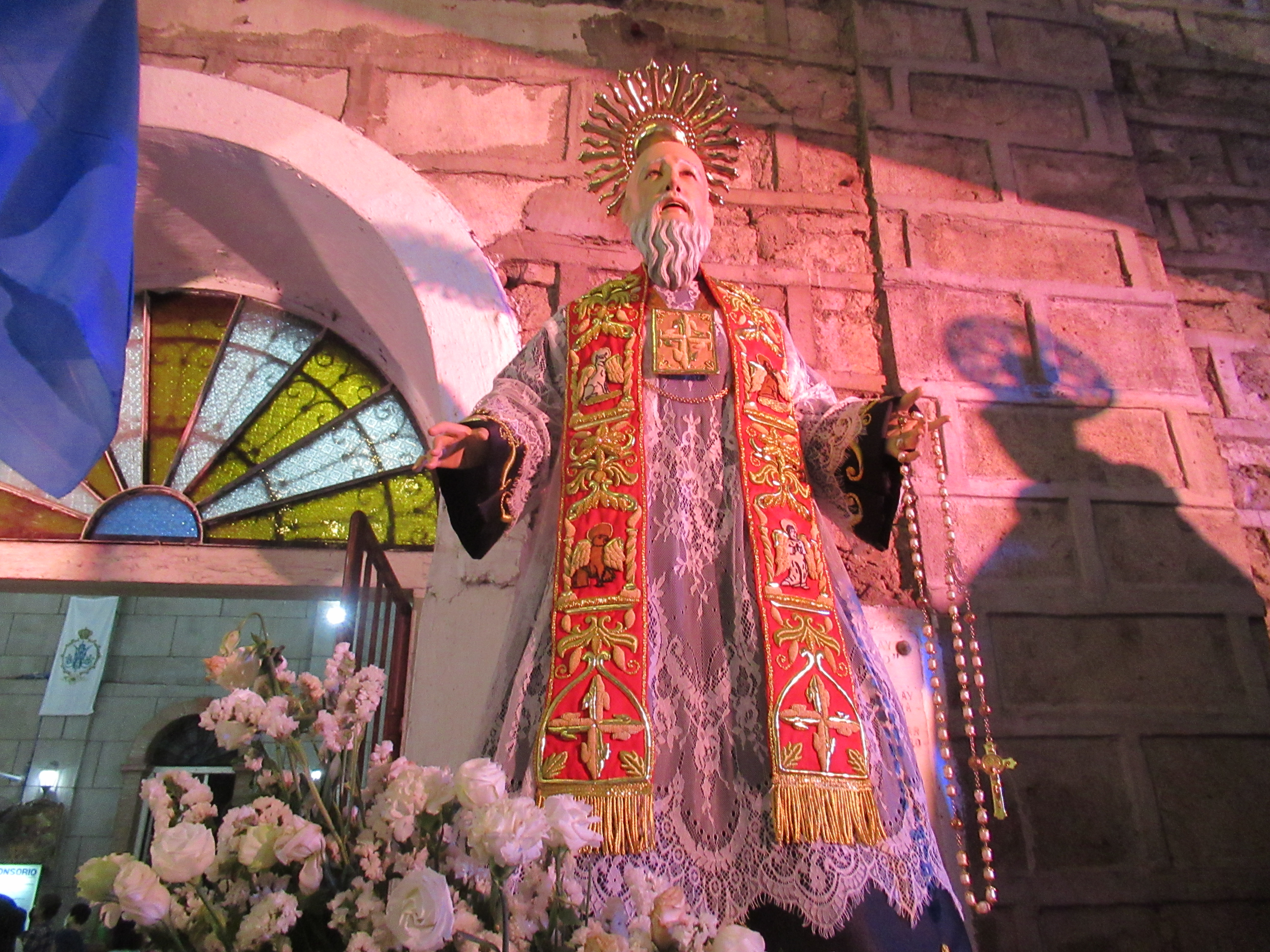
Thomas Khuong Tuc Ngo

- Thomas Khuong (c.1779-1860), Vietnamese priest, one of the Vietnamese Martyrs

== L ==
- Imelda Lambertini (1322-1333), patroness of the First Holy Communicants
- Bartolo Longo (1841-1926), brother of the Third Order and lawyer

== M ==
- John Macias (1585-1645), Spanish friar, missionary to Peru
- Margaret of Hungary (1242-1270), Hungarian nun, niece of Elizabeth of Hungary
- Margaret of Savoy (1382-1464), sister of the Third Order
- Dominic Mậu (c.1794-1858), Vietnamese priest, one of the Vietnamese Martyrs
- Miguel de Aozaraza (1598-1637), Spanish priest, missionary to the Philippines and Japan, one of the 16 Martyrs of Japan
- Louis de Montfort (1673-1716), French priest, known for his particular devotion to the Blessed Virgin Mary

== N ==
- Alfonso Navarrete (1571–1617), missionary in the Philippines and Japan, social worker, and Dominican protomartyr of Japan
- Joseph Nguyễn Đình Uyển (c.1775-1838), Vietnamese catechist, one of the Vietnamese Martyrs
- Joseph Khang Duy Nguyen (c.1832-1861), Vietnamese catechist, one of the Vietnamese Martyrs
- Thomas Nguyễn Văn Đệ (c.1811-1839), Vietnamese tailor, one of the Vietnamese Martyrs
- Dominic Nguyễn Văn Hạnh (1772-1838), Vietnamese priest, one of the Vietnamese Martyrs
- Augustine Nguyễn Văn Mới (c.1806-1839), Vietnamese lay, one of the Vietnamese Martyrs
- Peter Nguyễn Văn Tự (c.1796-1838), Vietnamese priest, one of the Vietnamese Martyrs
- Stephen Nguyễn Văn Vinh (c.1813-1839), Vietnamese lay, one of the Vietnamese Martyrs
- Dominic Nguyễn Văn Xuyên (c.1786-1839), Vietnamese priest, one of the Vietnamese Martyrs

== O ==
- Terence O'Brien (1600 – 30 October 1651) Irish Bishop, one of the Irish Catholic Martyrs
- Peter O'Higgins (c.1602-1642), Irish priest, one of the Irish Catholic Martyrs
- Osanna of Cattaro (1493-1565), visionary and sister of the Third Order
- Osanna of Mantua (1449-1505), mystic and sister of the Third Order

== P ==
- Peter of Verona (1206-1252), Italian friar and preacher, inquisitor in Lombardy
- Pier Giorgio Frassati (1901–1925), Third Order Dominican of the Archdiocese of Turin
- Pope Pius V (1504-1572), standardized the Roman Rite, instituted the feast of Our Lady of Victory
- Martin de Porres (1579-1639), Peruvian lay brother

== Q ==
- Stephana de Quinzanis (1457-1530), mystic, stigmatic, and sister of the Third Order

== R ==
- Raymond of Penyafort (c.1175-1275), Catalan friar
- Thomas Rokuzayemon (1590-1634), Japanese priest, one of the 16 Martyrs of Japan
- Rose of Lima (1586-1617), Peruvian Third Order Dominican
- Joachim Royo (1691-1748), Spanish priest, one of the Martyr Saints of China

== S ==
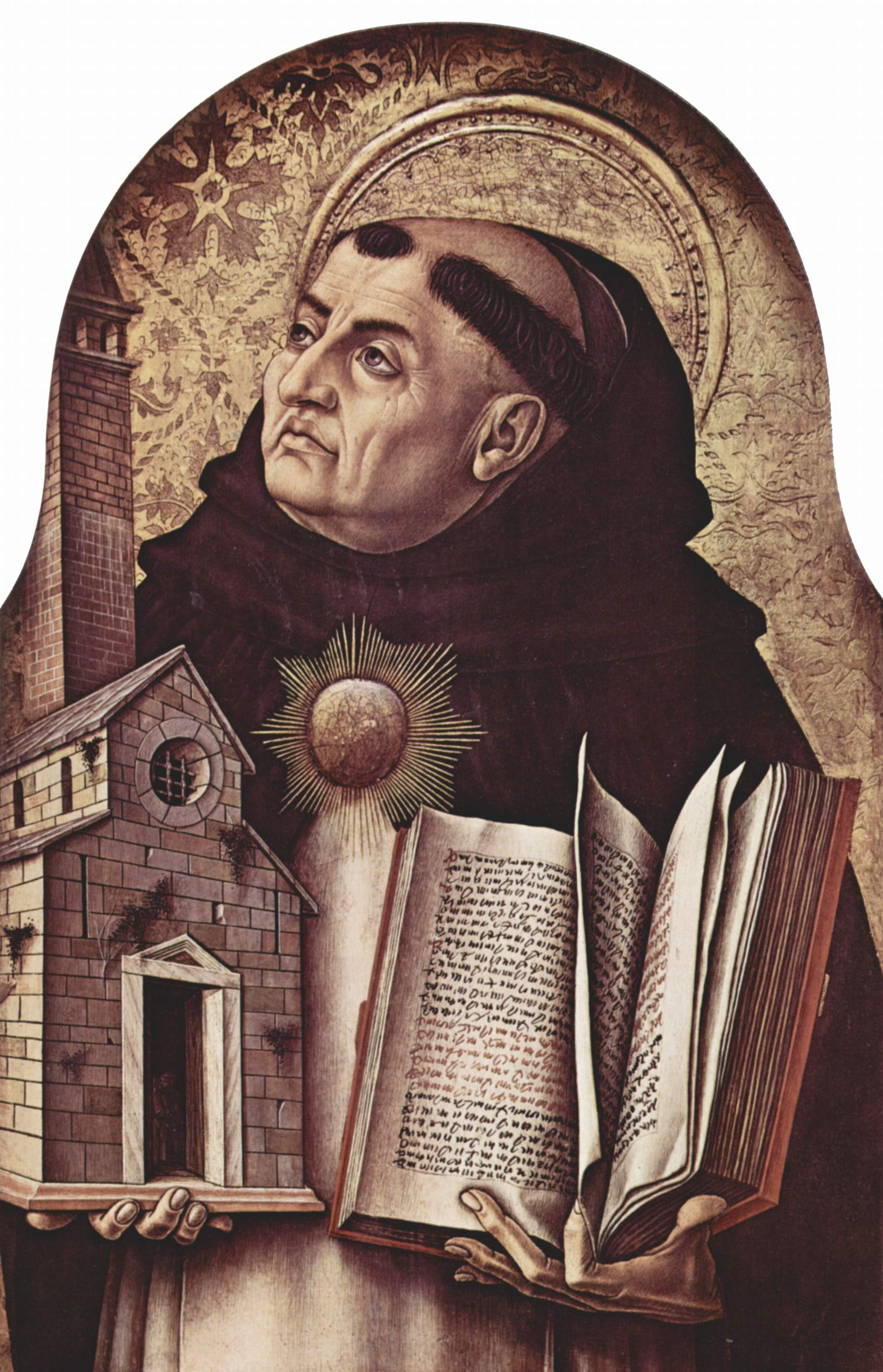
Saint Thomas Aquinas, Doctor of the Church

- Melchor García Sampedro (1821-1858), Spanish priest, Titular Bishop of Tricomia, one of the Vietnamese Martyrs
- Jose María Díaz Sanjurjo (1818-1857), Spanish priest, Titular Bishop of Platea, one of the Vietnamese Martyrs
- Peter Sanz (1680-1747), Catalan friar, one of the Martyr Saints of China
- Francis Serrano (1695-1748), Spanish titular bishop of Tipasa, Apostolic Vicar of Fuzhou, one of the Martyr Saints of China
- Vincent Shiwozuka (c.1576-1637), Japanese priest, one of the 16 Martyrs of Japan

== T ==
- Aimone Taparelli (c. 1395 – 1495), Italian preacher and inquisitor
- Thomas Toán (c.1764-1840), Vietnamese catechist, one of the Vietnamese Martyrs
- Jacobo Kyushei Tomonaga (c.1582-1633), Japanese priest, one of the 16 Martyrs of Japan.
- Dominic Trạch Đoài (c.1792-1840), Vietnamese priest, one of the Vietnamese Martyrs
- Joseph Tuân (c.1821-1861), Vietnamese priest, one of the Vietnamese Martyrs

== V ==
- Valentin de Berriochoa (1827-1861), Basque friar, Titular Bishop of Centuria, one of the Vietnamese Martyrs
- Vicente Liem de la Paz (1732-1773), Vietnamese friar, one of the Vietnamese Martyrs
- Dominic Vũ Đình Tước (c.1775-1839), Vietnamese priest, one of the Vietnamese Martyrs

== Z ==
- Thomas of Zumárraga (1577-1622), Spanish friar, missionary, and martyr of Japan

== See also ==
- List of Dominicans proposed for canonization
- Chinese Martyrs
