= 205 Martyrs of Japan =

Catholic missionaries and followers executed in Japan during the 17th century

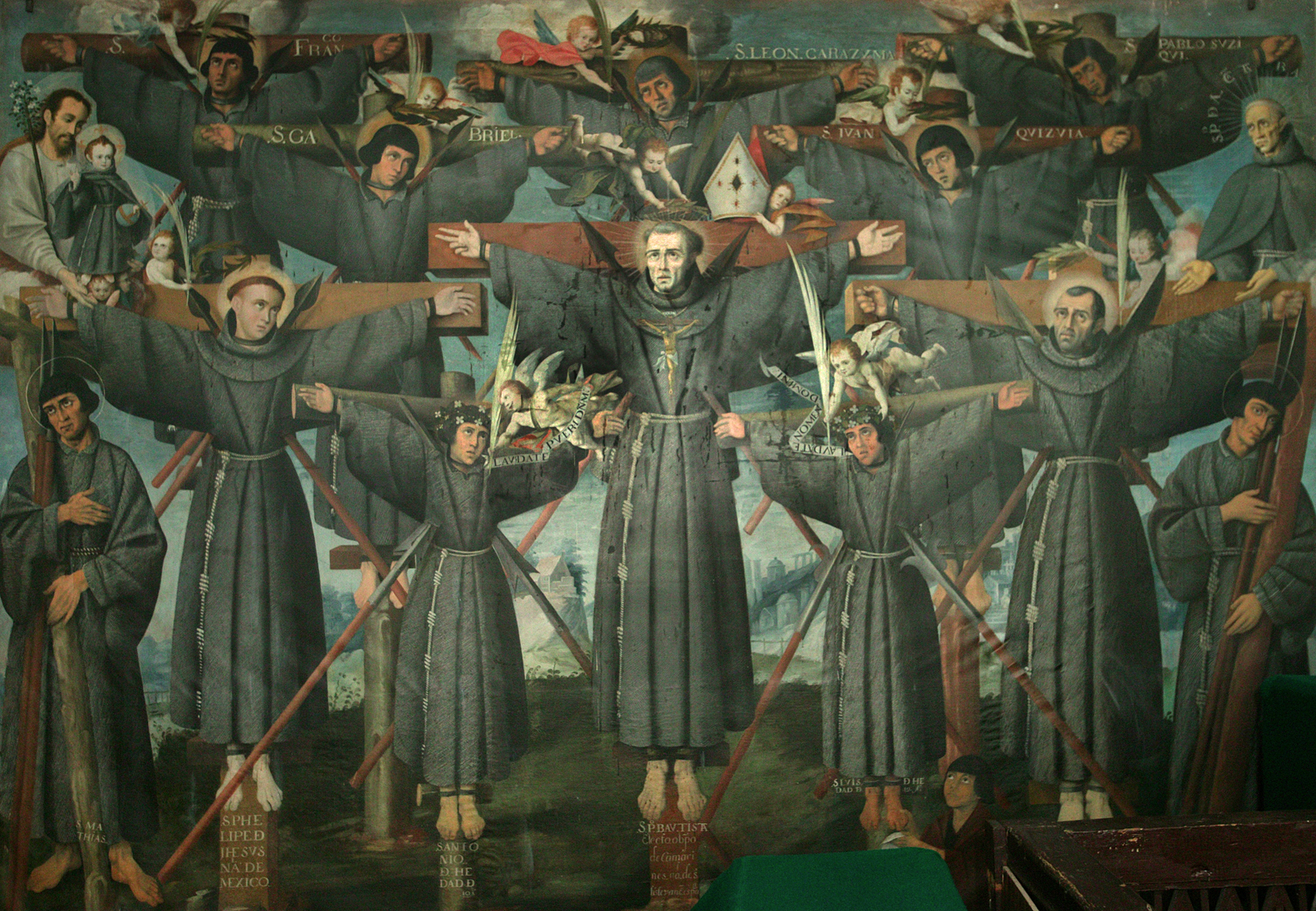
- Painting of the Nagasaki Martyrs

Martyrs
- Born: Unknown
- Died: Japan
- Venerated in: Roman Catholic Church; Anglican Church; Lutheran Church
- Beatified: 7 July 1867, Vatican City by Pope Pius IX
- Feast: 10 September

The 205 Martyrs of Japan (日本の殉教者, Nihon no junkyōsha) were Christian missionaries and followers who were persecuted and executed for their faith in Japan, mostly during the Tokugawa shogunate period in the 17th century.

A number of the figures were ethnic Koreans who were kidnapped, enslaved, and brought to Japan after the Japanese invasions of Korea.

== Background ==
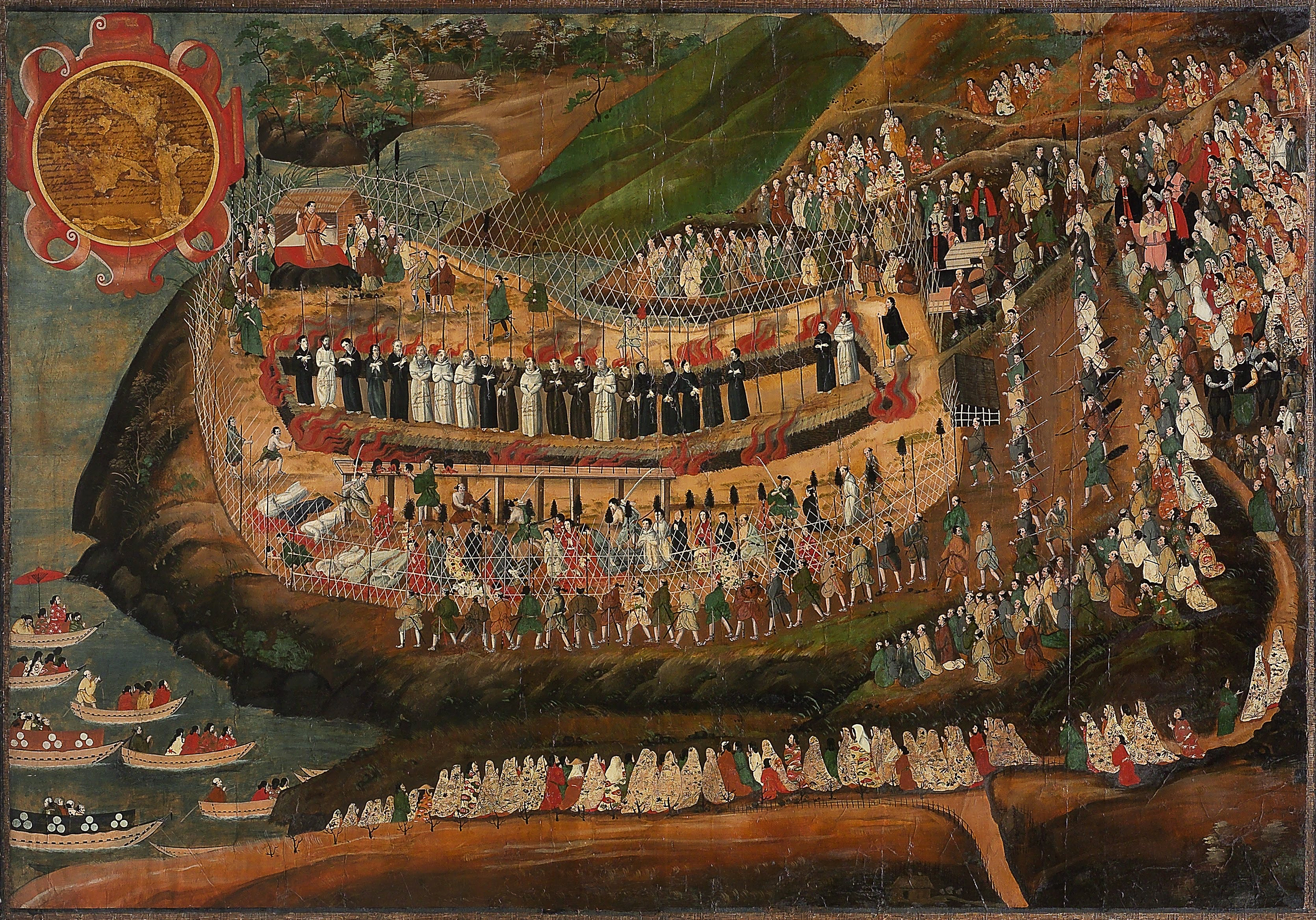
The Christian martyrs of the 1622 Great Genna Martyrdom. 16th/17th-century Japanese painting.

Christian missionaries arrived with Francis Xavier and the Jesuits in the 1540s and briefly flourished, with over 100,000 converts, including many daimyōs in Kyushu. The shogunate and imperial government at first supported the Catholic mission and the missionaries, thinking that they would reduce the power of the Buddhist monks, and help trade with Spain and Portugal. However, the Shogunate was also wary of colonialism, seeing that the Spanish had taken power in the Philippines, after converting the population. It soon met resistance from the highest office holders of Japan. Emperor Ogimachi issued edicts to ban Catholicism in 1565 and 1568, but to little effect. Beginning in 1587 with imperial regent Toyotomi Hideyoshi’s ban on Jesuit missionaries, Christianity was repressed as a threat to national unity. Many Christians were executed by burning at the stake in Nagasaki. After the Tokugawa shogunate banned Christianity in 1620, it ceased to exist publicly. Many Catholics went underground, becoming hidden Christians (隠れキリシタン, kakure kirishitan), while others were killed. Only after the Meiji Restoration, was Christianity re-established in Japan.

The first group of martyrs, known as the Twenty-Six Martyrs of Japan (1597), was canonized by the Church in 1862 by Pope Pius IX.

== Martyrdom ==
The persecution of Missionaries and Christian followers continued after the martyrdom of the twenty-six individuals in 1597. Jesuit fathers and others who had successfully fled to the Philippines wrote reports which led to a pamphlet that was printed in Madrid in 1624 "A Short Account of the Great and Rigorous Martyrdom, which last year (1622) was suffered in Japan by One Hundred and Eighteen Martyrs'.

Through the promulgation of decree on martyrdom, Pope Pius IX declared these martyrs venerable on 26 February 1866 and subsequently beatified them on 26 July 1867. Their feast day is September 10, the day of the Great Genna Martyrdom.

This group is also known as Alfonso Navarrette Benito, Perdo of Ávila, Carlo Spinola, Ioachim Díaz Hirayama, Lucia de Freitas, and 200 companions.

== Ordained martyrs ==
=== Augustinian and Augustinian Recollect ===
==== Foreign missionaries ====
- Blessed Ferdinand Ayala of Saint Joseph (OSA) – 1 June 1617
- Blessed Peter of Zúñiga (OSA) – 19 August 1622
- Blessed Bartolomé Gutiérrez Rodríguez (OSA) – 3 September 1632
- Blessed Francis of Jesus Terrero (OAR) – 3 September 1632
- Blessed Vincent of Saint Antony Simeons (OAR) – 3 September 1632
- Blessed Martin of St. Nicholas Lumbreras (OAR) – 3 September 1632
- Blessed Melchior of St. Augustine Sánchez (OAR) – 3 September 1632

Japanese missionary

- Blessed Thomas of Saint Augustine Jihyoe aka "Kintsuba" (OSA) - 6 November 1637

=== Dominican ===
==== Foreign missionaries ====
- Blessed Alonso de Mena Navarette – 10 September 1622
- Blessed Alfonso Navarrete – 1 June 1617
- Blessed Angelo of Saint Vincent Ferrer Orsucci – 10 September 1622
- Blessed Domingo Castellet Vinale – 8 September 1628
- Blessed Francisco Morales Sedeño – 10 September 1622
- Blessed Jacinto Orfanell-Prades – 10 September 1622
- Blessed Jose of Saint Hyacinth Maroto – 10 September 1622
- Blessed Juan Martínez Cid – 19 March 1619
- Blessed Luis Bertrán Exarch – 29 July 1627
- Blessed Luis Flores (Louis Fraryn) – 19 August 1622
- Blessed Pedro of Saint Catherine Vásquez – 25 August 1624
- Blessed Tomás of the Holy Spirit – 12 September 1622

==== Japanese ====
- Blessed Antonio of Saint Dominic - 8 September 1628
- Blessed Dominicus of the Rosary Magoshichirō – 10 September 1622
- Blessed Mancius of the Cross – 29 July 1627
- Blessed Mancius of Saint Thomas Shibata – 12 September 1622
- Blessed Petrus of Saint Mary – 29 July 1627
- Blessed Thomas of the Rosary – 10 September 1622
- Blessed Thomas of Saint Hyacinth – 8 September 1628

=== Franciscan – Alcantarines ===
==== Foreign missionaries ====
- Blessed Antonius of Saint Francis – 16 August 1627
- Blessed Francisco de Gálve Iranzo – 4 December 1623
- Blessed Francisco of Saint Mary – 16 August 1627
- Blessed Gabriel of the Magdalene – 3 September 1632
- Blessed Pedro of the Assumption – 22 May 1617
- Blessed Pedro of Ávila – 10 September 1622
- Blessed Vincent of Saint Joseph Ramírez – 10 September 1622

==== Japanese ====
- Blessed Antonio of Saint Dominic – 8 September 1628
- Blessed Dominicus of Saint Francis – 8 September 1628
- Blessed Franciscus of Saint Bonaventure – 12 September 1622
- Blessed Paulus of Saint Clare – 12 September 1622

=== Franciscan – Observant ===
==== Foreign missionaries ====
- Blessed Apolinar Franco Garcia – 12 September 1622
- Blessed Bartolomé Días Laurel – 16 August 1627
- Blessed Juan Santamarta – 16 August 1618
- Blessed Luis Cabrera Sotelo – 25 August 1624
- Blessed Richard of Saint Anne – 10 September 1622

==== Japanese ====
- Blessed Louis Sasada – 25 August 1624

=== Jesuit ===
==== Foreign missionaries ====
- Blessed Ambrosio Fernandes – 7 January 1620
- Blessed Baltasar de Torres Arias – 20 June 1626
- Blessed Camillo Battista Constanzo – 15 September 1622
- Blessed Carlo Spinola – 10 September 1622
- Blessed Diogo Carvalho (martyr) (Didacus Carvalho) – 22 February 1624
- Blessed Francisco Pacheco SJ – 20 June 1626
- Blessed John Baptist Zola – 20 June 1626
- Blessed Girolamo de Angelis – 4 December 1623
- Blessed João Baptista Machado de Távora – 22 May 1617
- Blessed Miguel de Carvalho – 25 August 1624
- Blessed Pietro Paolo Navarra – 1 November 1622

==== Japanese ====
- Blessed Antonius Ishida Kyūtaku – 3 September 1632
- Blessed Antonius Kyūni – 10 September 1622
- Blessed Augustinus Ōta – 10 August 1622
- Blessed Dionisius Fujishima Jubyōe – 1 November 1622
- Blessed Gaspar Sadamatsu – 20 June 1626
- Blessed Gundisalvus Fusai Chōzō – 10 September 1622
- Blessed Ioannes Chūgoku – 10 September 1622
- Blessed Joannes Kisaku – 20 June 1626
- Blessed Leonardus Kimura – 18 November 1619
- Blessed Ludovicus Kawara Rokuemon – 10 September 1622
- Blessed Michaël Nakashima Saburōemon – 25 December 1628
- Blessed Michaël Satō Shunpō – 10 September 1622
- Blessed Michaël Tōzō – 20 June 1626
- Blessed Paulus Shinsuke – 20 June 1626
- Blessed Petrus Onizuka Sadayū – 1 November 1622
- Blessed Petrus Rinsei – 20 June 1626
- Blessed Petrus Sanpō – 10 September 1622
- Blessed Sebastianus Kimura – 10 September 1622
- Blessed Simon Enpō – 4 December 1623
- Blessed Thomas Akahoshi – 10 September 1622
- Blessed Thomas Tsūji – 7 September 1627
- Blessed Vincentius Kaǔn (Korean) – 20 June 1626

== Martyred laity ==
=== Augustinian laity ===
==== Japanese religious brother ====
- Blessed John Shozaburo – 28 October 1630

==== Japanese oblates ====
- Blessed Michael Kiuchi Tayemon – 28 October 1630
- Blessed Peter Kuhieye – 28 October 1630
- Blessed Thomas Terai Kahioye – 28 October 1630

==== Japanese tertiaries ====
- Blessed Lawrence Hachizo – 28 October 1630
- Blessed Mancio Seisayemon – 28 October 1630
- Saint Magdalene of Nagasaki (OAR) - 15 October 1634

=== Dominican laity ===
==== Foreign Missionaries – Confraternity of the Holy Rosary ====
- Blessed Domingos Jorge – 18 November 1619

==== Japanese – Confraternity of the Holy Rosary ====
- Blessed Agnes Takeya (Korean) – 10 September 1622
- Blessed Alexius Nakamura – 27 November 1619
- Blessed Andreas Murayama Tokuan – 18 November 1619
- Blessed Andreas Yoshida – 1 October 1617
- Blessed Antonius Hamanomachi (Korean) – 10 September 1622
- Blessed Antonius Kimura – 27 November 1619
- Blessed Antonius Sanga – 10 September 1622
- Blessed Antonius Yamada – 19 August 1622
- Blessed Apollonia of Nagasaki – 10 September 1622
- Blessed Bartholomaeus Kawano Shichiemon – 10 September 1622
- Blessed Bartholomaeus Mohyōe – 19 August 1622
- Blessed Bartholomaeus Seki – 27 November 1619
- Blessed Catharina of Nagasaki (Korean) – 10 September 1622
- Blessed Clara Yamada – 10 September 1622
- Blessed Clemens Ono – 10 September 1622
- Blessed Cosmas Takeya Sozaburō (Korean) – 18 November 1619
- Blessed Damianus Tanda Yaichi – 10 September 1622
- Blessed Dominicus Nakano – 10 September 1622
- Blessed Dominicus Yamada – 10 September 1622
- Blessed Dominica Ogata – 10 September 1622
- Blessed Gaspar Ueda Hikojirō – 1 October 1617
- Blessed Iacobus Matsuo Denji – 19 August 1622
- Blessed Joannes Iwanaga – 27 November 1619
- Blessed Ioannes Miyazaki Soemon – 19 August 1622
- Blessed Joannes Motoyama – 27 November 1619
- Blessed Ioannes Nagata Matashichi – 19 August 1622
- Blessed Ioannes Yagō (Korean) – 19 August 1622
- Blessed Joannes Yoshida Shōun – 18 November 1619
- Blessed Ioachim Diaz Hirayama – 19 August 1622
- Blessed Isabella Fernandes – 10 September 1622
- Blessed Jakub Bunzō Gengorō – 17 August 1620
- Blessed Laurentius Ikegami Rokusuke – 19 August 1622
- Blessed Leo Nakanishi – 27 November 1619
- Blessed Leo Sukeemon – 19 August 1622
- Blessed Matthias Kozasa – 27 November 1619
- Blessed Matthias Nakano – 27 November 1619
- Blessed Magdalena Kiyota Bokusai – 17 August 1620
- Blessed Magdalena Sanga – 10 September 1622
- Blessed Marcus Takenoshita Shin’emon – 19 August 1622
- Blessed Maria Gengorō – 17 August 1620
- Blessed Maria Hamanomachi – 10 September 1622
- Blessed Maria Murayama – 10 September 1622
- Blessed Maria Tanaura – 10 September 1622
- Blessed Maria Yoshida – 10 September 1622
- Blessed Michaël Diaz Hori – 19 August 1622
- Blessed Michaël Takeshita – 27 November 1619
- Blessed Paulus Sankichi – 19 August 1622
- Blessed Romanus Motoyama Myotarō – 27 November 1619
- Blessed Rufus Ishimoto – 10 September 1622
- Blessed Simon Kiyota Bokusai – 17 August 1620
- Blessed Thecla Nagaishi – 10 September 1622
- Blessed Thomas Gengorō – 17 August 1620
- Blessed Thomas Koteda Kyūmi – 27 November 1619
- Blessed Thomas Koyanagi – 19 August 1622
- Blessed Thomas Shichirō – 10 September 1622

==== Japanese tertiaries ====
- Blessed Alexius Sanbashi Saburō – 10 September 1622
- Blessed Caius Akashi Jiemon (Korean) – 16 August 1627
- Blessed Dominicus Shobyōye – 16 September 1628
- Blessed Francisca Pinzokere – 16 August 1627
- Blessed Gaspar Koteda – 11 September 1622
- Blessed Iacobus Hayashida – 10 September 1628
- Blessed Ioannes Imamura – 8 September 1628
- Blessed Joannes Tomachi – 8 September 1628
- Blessed Leo Aibara – 8 September 1628
- Blessed Leo Kurōbyōe Nakamura – 16 August 1627
- Blessed Lucia Ludovica – 8 September 1628
- Blessed Ludovicus Nihachi – 8 September 1628
- Blessed Magdalena Kiyota – 16 August 1627
- Blessed Maria Tanaka – 10 September 1622
- Blessed Matthaeus Alvarez Anjin – 8 September 1628
- Blessed Michaël Himonoya – 16 September 1628
- Blessed Michaël Yamada Kasahashi – 8 September 1628
- Blessed Paulus Aibara Sandayū – 8 September 1628
- Blessed Paulus Himonoya – 16 September 1628
- Blessed Paulus Nagaishi – 10 September 1622
- Blessed Paulus Tanaka – 10 September 1622
- Blessed Romanus Aibara – 8 September 1628

=== Franciscan laity ===
==== Japanese tertiaries ====
- Blessed Franciscus Kuhyōe – 16 August 1627
- Blessed Gaspar Vaz (Korean) – 16 August 1627 Tsuji Shōbyōe
- Blessed Hieronymus of the Cross – 3 September 1632 Iyo
- Blessed Leo Satsuma – 10 September 1622
- Blessed Louis Baba – 25 August 1624
- Blessed Ludovicus Maki Soetsu – 7 September 1627
- Blessed Ludovicus Matsuo Soyemon – 16 August 1627
- Blessed Lucia de Freitas – 10 September 1622
- Blessed Lucas Tsuji Kyūemon – 16 August 1627
- Blessed Martinus Gómez Tōzaemon – 1 August 1627
- Blessed Maria Vaz (Korean) – 16 August 1627 Maria Shōbyōe
- Blessed Michaël Koga Kizayemon – 16 August 1627
- Blessed Thomas Satō Shin’emon (Korean) – 16 August 1627

=== Catechist laity ===
==== Japanese ====
- Blessed Caius of Korea (Korean) – 15 November 1624
- Blessed Leo Tanaka (martyr) – 1 June 1617
- Blessed Matthias of Nagasaki – 27 May 1620

=== Christian laity ===
==== Japanese ====
- Blessed Andreas Yakichi – 2 October 1622
- Blessed Antonius Ono – 10 September 1622
- Blessed Catharina Tanaka – 12 July 1626
- Blessed Clemens Kyūemon – 1 November 1622
- Blessed Dominicus Magoshichi – 12 September 1622
- Blessed Dominicus Nihachi – 8 September 1628
- Blessed Dominicus Tomachi – 8 September 1628
- Blessed Franciscus Nihachi – 8 September 1628
- Blessed Franciscus Takeya – 11 September 1622
- Blessed Franciscus Yakichi – 2 October 1622
- Blessed Ignatius Jorge-Fernandes – 10 September 1622
- Blessed Ioannes Hamanomachi – 10 September 1622
- Blessed Ioannes Maki Jizaemon – 7 September 1627
- Blessed Ioannes Onizuka Naizen – 12 July 1626
- Blessed Ioannes Tanaka – 12 July 1626
- Blessed Laurentius Yamada – 8 September 1628
- Blessed Lucia Yakichi – 2 October 1622
- Blessed Ludovicus Onizuka – 12 July 1626
- Blessed Ludovicus Yakichi – 2 October 1622
- Blessed Mancius Araki Kyūzaburō – 8 July 1626
- Blessed Matthias Araki Hyōzaemon – 12 July 1626
- Blessed Michaël Tanda – 10 September 1622
- Blessed Michaël Tomachi – 8 September 1628
- Blessed Monica Onizuka – 12 July 1626
- Blessed Paulus Tomachi – 8 September 1628
- Blessed Petrus Araki Chobyōe – 12 July 1626
- Blessed Petrus Hamanomachi (Korean) – 10 September 1622
- Blessed Petrus Kawano – 11 September 1622
- Blessed Petrus Nagaishi – 10 September 1622
- Blessed Thomas Tomachi – 8 September 1628
- Blessed Zuzanna Araki Chobyōe – 12 July 1626

== See also ==
- Christianity in Japan
- Great Genna Martyrdom
- Kirishitan
- Martyrs of Japan
- Nanban trade
- Paulo Miki
- Roman Catholicism in Japan
- Twenty-Six Martyrs Museum and Monument
