= Alfonso Navarrete =

Spanish Catholic martyr (1571–1617)

Blessed Alfonso Navarrete O.P.
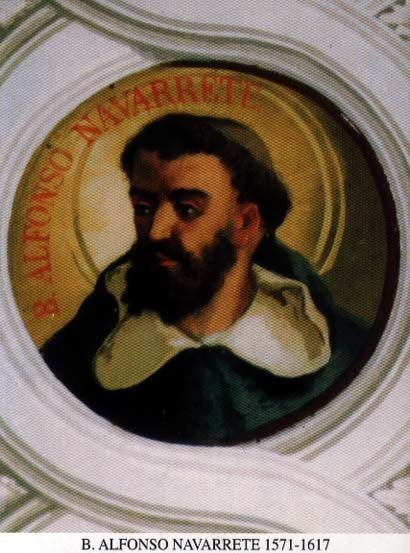
- Born: 1571; Logroño, Spain
- Died: 1 June 1617 (aged 45–46); Ōmura Domain, Japan
- Cause of death: Decapitation
- Venerated in: Catholic Church (Japan & the Order of Preachers)
- Beatified: 7 July 1867 by Pope Pius IX
- Feast: 1 June (with companions Ferdinand Ayala & Leo Tanaca); 10 September (as one of the 205 Martyrs of Japan); 6 November (with the other Dominican Martyrs of Japan)
- Attributes: Dominican Habit, Palm of Martyrdom

Blessed Alfonso Navarrete OP, also known as Alfonso Navarrete-Benito, sometimes latinised as Alphonsus, (1571 – 1 June 1617) was a Spanish nobleman, Dominican friar, Catholic priest, and missionary in the Philippines (1598–1610) and in Japan (1611–death), active during the anti-Christian persecutions of early Tokugawa Japan, in the Shogunate of Hidetada. Celebrated for his social work he has been called the Vincent de Paul of Japan and at some point became Master of the Order of Preachers in the country. He was executed by beheading in the Ōmura Domain on the orders of the Daimyo Ōmura Sumiyori on 1 June 1617.

At the time of his arrest before his martyrdom he was travelling with two companions Blessed Ferdinand Ayala, an Augustinian friar, and Blessed Leo Tanaca, a lay catechist, and they are commemorated together annually on the 1st of June. These three companions are part of the larger group of 205 Martyrs of Japan commemorated on the 10th of September. As the first Friar Preacher to suffer execution in the country, Alphonsus has the honour of protomartyr of the Dominicans in Japan. His example quickly became an inspiration to later missionaries to Japan from the Order of Preachers such as canonised saints Giordano Ansalone, Domingo Ibáñez de Erquicia, Guillaume Courtet, and Lorenzo Ruiz. He is commemorated with the other Dominican friars and tertiaries martyred during the shogunate persecutions on the 6th of November.

== Life ==
Alphonso was the son of a nobleman of the Navarrete family in the city of Logroño sometime in the late 16th century, perhaps 1571. Presumably an eldest son, he gave up his inheritance to enter the Order of Friars Preachers at the Priory of San Pablo in Valladolid at an early age. On completion of his studies for the priesthood he left as a missionary for the Far East in 1598, serving first in the Philippines. His departure came just a year after the execution of the famous 26 Martyrs of Japan in 1597. During his time in the Philippines he notably ministered in the Islands around Cagayancillo and Mapun (the Cagayan Islands).

In 1610 Alfonso returned to Spain to recruit more missionaries. On his return voyage to the Orient in 1611 he requested a transfer to the missions of Japan, arriving in what is now the Nagasaki Prefecture. His 6 years of missionary work undertaken in Japan was characterised chiefly by social work to some of the most vulnerable members of Japanese society, collecting abandoned babies and begging wealthy Spaniards for the finances necessary to support them. It was this work that earned him the epithet "Vincent de Paul of Japan". He also undertook the regular missionary work of baptising converts, saying mass, and where possible preaching. At some stage he became the Provincial Master of the Friars Preachers in Japan, thereby also becoming the head of the lay persons branch of the Dominicans, the Third Order of St. Dominic, and the Dominican Confraternity of the Holy Rosary.

He tried to encourage the continued growth of the church in the heavily Christianised Ōmura Domain, around Nagasaki. After rapid Catholic expansion under Japan's first Christian Daimyo, Ōmura Sumitada, hostilities began to arise in 1606 after Sumitada's son Ōmura Yoshiaki apostatised from his Catholic faith. Alfonso encouraged Yoshiaki to return to the faith sometime between his appointment as head of the Dominicans in Japan and before the Daimyo's death but to no avail. Persecution exploded with new bravado and fervour after the young Ōmura Sumiyori succeeded his father as Daimyo. While there had been dangers throughout his 6 years in Japan, this period proved the most dangerous for Alphonso.

== Martyrdom ==
On May 22, 1617, two priests, the Jesuit Blessed João Baptista Machado and a Franciscan companion, were martyred at the young Daimyo's headquarters Kushima Castle in Ōmura. Alphonso decided to try and recover the sacred relics of the May 22nd martyrs and began journeying to the regional capital with two companions, Blessed Ferdinand Ayala, an Augustinian friar, and Blessed Leo Tanaca, a local Japanese catechist. They were captured on their journey, split up and tortured in different locations, and finally beheaded at various locations in the Ōmura Domain. An account from a 1901 compendium of Dominican Hagiographies describes Alfonso's death thusly:

"After dragging him from one desert island to another, in order to find some spot where his execution might take place unknown to the Christians, the soldiers at length struck of his head as he knelt in prayer, holding his rosary and a blessed candle in one hand, and a wooden cross in the other. His martyrdom took place on June 1st, A.D. 1617."

After execution Alfonso's body was thrown into the sea to prevent it from being venerated as a relic itself.

== Veneration ==
=== Beatification ===
Alphonso was beatified by Pope Pius IX on the 7th of July, 1867 together with his two companions and many other Dominican martyrs.

=== Memorials ===
Alfonso is commemorated on three different dates in church calendars: on the 1st of June with Blessed Ferdinand and Leo Tanaca, on the 10th of September as one of the 205 Japanese Martyrs, and on the 6th of November as one of the 59 Dominican Martyrs of Japan.

== Sources ==
=== In English ===
- Kegan, Paul (1901). Short Lives of the Dominican Saints - Extract on Bl. Alphonse Navarette & Companions. London: Trench, and Trübner & Co., Ltd.
- "BL. ALPHONSUS NAVARETTE & COMPANIONS, M.M.O.P. - Feast Day June 1st". sacredheart-op.com. 10 September 2016.
- "Alfonso Navarrete Benito". catholic.net.
- Davoren, Mark (6 November 2008). "Dominican Martyrs of Japan". www.english.op.org. godzdogz.

=== In Italian ===
- "Enciclopedie on line - Navarrete, Alonso, beato". Treccani.it. "Dominican missionary (Logroño 1571 - Takayama 1617); preached in the Philippines (Cagayan Islands) and in Japan, where he remained despite the expulsion. He died beheaded; beatified in 1867"

=== In Japanese ===
- "ナバレテ - Navarrete, F. Alonzo de 1571-1617".

=== In Spanish ===
- "Beato Alfonso Navarrete".

== See also ==
- 205 Martyrs of Japan
- Pedro Vásquez
- Thomas of Zumárraga
- Giordano Ansalone
- Domingo Ibáñez de Erquicia
- Guillaume Courtet
