= Leonardo Kimura =

Blessed Leonardo Kimura S.J.
- The martyrdom of Leonardo Kimura

Jesuit priest
- Born: 1575; Nagasaki, Japan
- Died: 18 November 1619 (aged 44); Nishizaka hill, Nagasaki
- Venerated in: Catholic Church; Society of Jesus
- Beatified: 7 May 1867, Rome, Papal States by Pope Pius IX, Catholic Church

Leonardo Kimura, SJ (also known as レオナルド 木村 or レ゜オナルド; 1575 – 18 November 1619) was a Japanese Catholic evangelist, teacher, and member of the Society of Jesus. Killed as a victim of anti-Catholic persecution in Japan, he was beatified by Pope Pius IX in 1867.

== Background ==
The development of Christianity in Japan started in 1549 thanks to St. Francis Xavier. Years later, he encountered a number of problems. The growing number of followers changed the attitude of the authorities, who were afraid that their position would become weakened. Other reasons for the shoguns and daimyos to withdraw their support for the mission included the conflicts between Spanish and Portuguese merchants, as well as disputes between the missionaries themselves about methods of evangelization. All these factors led to further waves of persecution.

After a period of increased missionary activity by the Catholic Church, it is estimated that 400,000 people professed this religion in Japan in 1613. That year, the Shogun Tokugawa Hidetada issued a decree under which, under the threat of losing their lives, all missionaries were to leave the country, and the practice and teaching of the religion were forbidden.

== Biography ==
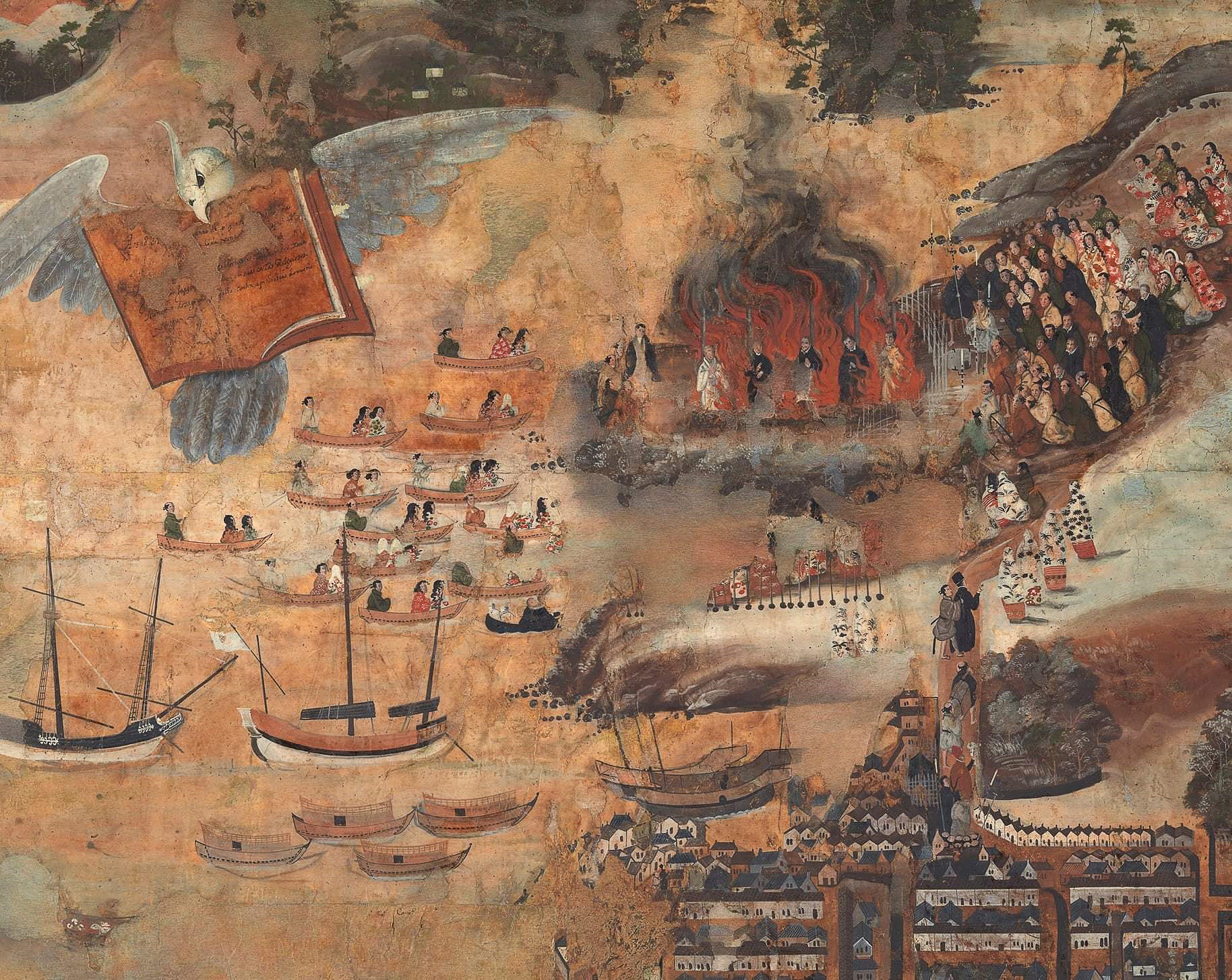
The martyrdom of Leonardo Kimura, 1619

Leonardo Kimura came from a noble Christian family. His grandfather was baptized by St. Francis Xavier. He was educated at the local Jesuit school, and from 1588 he worked as a catechist. He joined the Society of Jesus in November 1602. By his own choice, he remained a religious brother, initially as a cook and tailor, and later as a catechist.

In December 1616, he was arrested on false allegations of murder. During the trial, he revealed his religious affiliation, for which he was sent to prison, where he undertook his apostolate and converted 96 people. His attitude contributed to recognition by his fellow prisoners as a spiritual leader. On November 18, 1619, he was asked by a governor called Gonroku if he belonged to the Society of Jesus and if so, why did he not comply with the binding order to leave Japan, and he replied:

I have remained to preach faith in Jesus Christ and I want to preach it to my last breath.

Later that same day, he was burned at the stake along with four other Christians in Nishizaka hill, Nagasaki. The anniversary of his death (dies natalis) is the day he is remembered in the Catholic Church. Leonardo Kimura was among the 205 Martyrs of Japan beatified on May 7, 1867, by Pope Pius IX.

== Martyrs ==
These are the 5 Christians who were executed by burning at the stake at Nishizaka hill, Nagasaki on 18 November 1619.

Martyrs
Name	Role	Affiliation	Birthplace
Leonardo Kimura (レオナルド 木村; 1575 – 18 November 1619)	Professed religious, Jesuit	Society of Jesus	Born in Nagasaki, Japan
Andreas Murayama Tokuan (アンドレス村山徳安; ? – 18 November 1619)	Layperson of the archdiocese of Nagasaki	Member, Confraternity of the Rosary	Born in Nagasaki, Japan
Cosmas Takeya Sozaburo (コメス竹屋長兵衛; ? – 18 November 1619)	Layperson of the archdiocese of Nagasaki	Member, Confraternity of the Rosary	Born in Korea
Ioannes Yoshida Shoun (フアン吉田正左衛門素雲; ? – 18 November 1619)	Layperson of the archdiocese of Nagasaki	Member, Confraternity of the Rosary	born in Miyako, Japan
Domingos Jorge (ドミンゴス ジョrゲ; ? – 18 November 1619)	Layperson of the archdiocese of Nagasaki	member, Confraternity of the Rosary	born in San Román, Aguiar de Sousa, Porto, Portugal

== See also ==
- Martyrs of Japan
- List of Catholic saints
- Freedom of religion
