= Great Martyrdom of Edo =

1623 execution of 50 Christians in Edo

Coordinates: 35°38′41″N 139°44′32″E

1646 depiction of the martyrdom of Jerome de Angelis

The Great Martyrdom of Edo was the execution of 50 foreign and domestic Catholics (kirishitans), who were burned alive for their Christianity in Edo (modern-day Tokyo), Japan, on 4 December 1623.

The mass execution was part of the persecution of Christians in Japan by Tokugawa Iemitsu, the third shogun of the Tokugawa shogunate.

Among the executed was Jerome de Angelis (1567–1623), an Italian Jesuit missionary to Japan.

== Background and execution ==
=== Background ===
In August 1623, Tokugawa Hidetada retired the shogunate and his son Tokugawa Iemitsu was appointed shogun. He continued his father's policy of Christian prosecution. As shogun, he established the office of shūmon aratame yaku, the office of inquisition, and used it for his policy of eradication of Christianity in Japan. Tokugawa Iemitsu considered it important not only to keep the legislation against Christianity of his father, but also to set an example. This example was set with the Great Edo Martyrdom.

Shortly before or after Tokugawa Iemitsu returned from Kyoto on 18 October 1623, a number of Christians were arrested and held at the Kodenmachō Jailhouse in Edo. These arrests came in the wake of a betrayal by a servant of the Christian hatamoto John Hara Mondo-no-suke Tanenobu.

The decision on how to proceed with the jailed Christians was laid before the new shogun, who hesitated and first consulted with his retired father who advised that such a decision must be taken by the shogun. Tokugawa Iemitsu then took the decision to execute all 51 jailed Christians.

The date of the execution was set to 4 December 1623. This date was probably chosen because many daimyos were in Edo during this time of the year and the execution was meant to leave an impression on them.

=== Execution ===
The execution happened in the Tamachi area of Edo on 4 December 1623. It was carried out on the roadside of the Tōkaidō, the most important of the Five Routes, connecting Kyoto to Edo. The choosing of this busy place was again a sign that the mass execution was intended to set an example.

The execution began with the hikimawashi, a parade of the condemned around the city. The procession was led by three persons on horseback: Jerome de Angelis, an Italian Jesuit missionary; Francis Galvez, a Franciscan priest; and John Hara Mondo-no-suke Tanenobu, a Japanese Christian hatamoto. According to a Jesuit annual letter, (Note: The letter (Lettera annua del Giappone dell'anno 1624 [Annual letter from Japan from the year 1624]) was authored by Joao Rodrigues Girão and finished in Macau on 28 March 1625. It was translated into English by Edmund Neville in 1630.) fifty-one people were led to the stake during this procession, but one renounced his faith and was not put to death. The same annual letter describes that a sign was put up to explain the reason why this severe punishment was to be carried out. It read:

These men are condemned to so severe a punishment because they are Christians.

The three Christians on horseback were set aside and the 47 other Christians were being burnt alive first. Then the burning of Jerome de Angelis, Francis Galvez and John Hara Mondo-no-suke Tanenobu followed.

== List of the martyrs ==
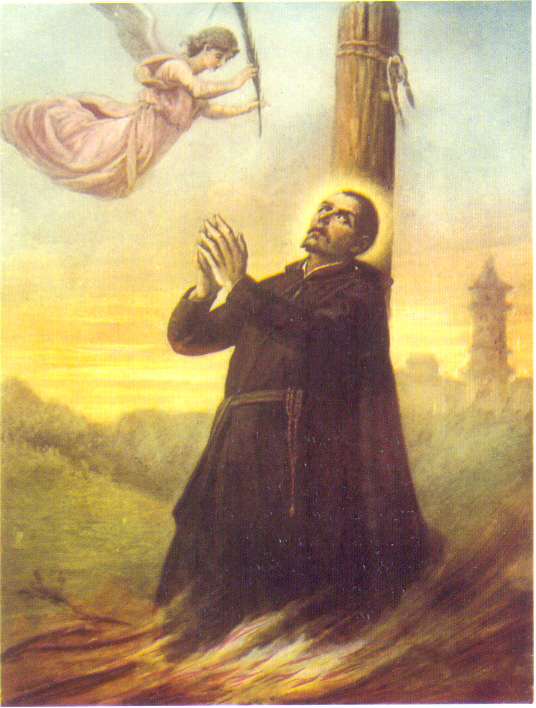
Depiction of Jerome de Angelis at the Church of the Gesù, Palermo

Of the 50 martyrs 36 have been identified by name:

1. John Hara Mondo-no-suke Tanenobu
2. Jerome de Angelis
3. Fr. Francis Galvez, O.F.M.
4. Leo Takeya Gonshichi (Jerome de Angelis' host)
5. Hanzaburo Kashiya
6. John Chozaemon (Francis Galvez' catechist)
7. Simon Empo (Yemon), S.J. (born 1580; dōjuku to Jerome de Angelis)
8. Peter Kisaburo
9. John Matazaemon
10. Michael Kizaemon
11. Laurence Kashichi
12. Matthias Yazaemon
13. Laurence Kakuzaemon
14. Matthias Kizaemon
15. Thomas Yosaku
16. Peter Santaro
17. Peter Sazaemon
18. Matthias Sekiemon
19. Ignatius Choemon
20. Simon Muan
21. Denis Ioccunu
22. Isaac
23. Bonaventure Kyudayu
24. John Shinkuro
25. Hilary Magozaemon (Francis Galvez' host)
26. Francis Kizaemon
27. Sashimonoya Shinshichiro
28. John Chozaemon
29. Roman Gon'emon
30. Emmanuel Buemon
31. Peter Kiemon
32. Kizaburo
33. Peter Choemon
34. Andrew Risuke
35. Raphael Kichizaemon
36. Kishichi
37. Anthony

== Beatification and remembrance ==
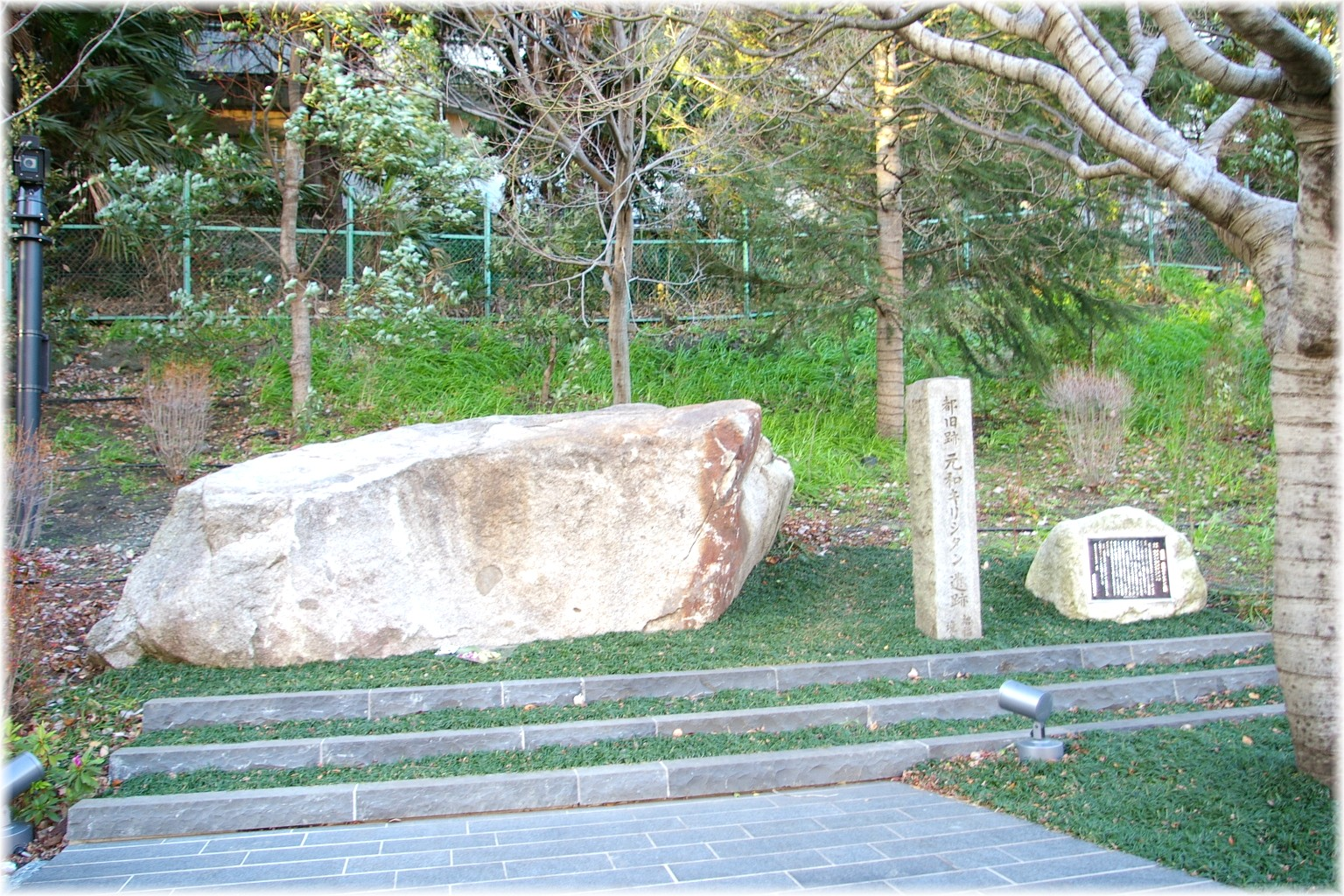
Monument of the place of the execution, Minato City, Tokyo

Of the 50 executed only Jerome de Angelis, Simon Empo (Yemon) and Francis Galvez were beatified as part of the 205 martyrs of Japan on 7 July 1867 by Pope Pius IX, because there was deemed to be insufficient information about the other 47. John Hara Mondo-no-suke Tanenobu was later beatified by Pope Benedict XVI in Nagasaki on 24 November 2008 together with 187 other martyrs of Japan.

The execution site was left unoccupied at first, then a small Buddhist temple named Chifukuji Temple was built directly on it. This temple has now been moved and a monument for the remembrance of the execution has been erected.

On 19 November 2023, the Archbishop of Tokyo, Tarcisio Isao Kikuchi, celebrated Mass at Takanawa Catholic Church, commemorating the 400th anniversary of the Great Martyrdom of Edo.

== See also ==
- Great Genna Martyrdom
