= Maria Angela Astorch =

Blessed Maria Angela Astorch OSCCap
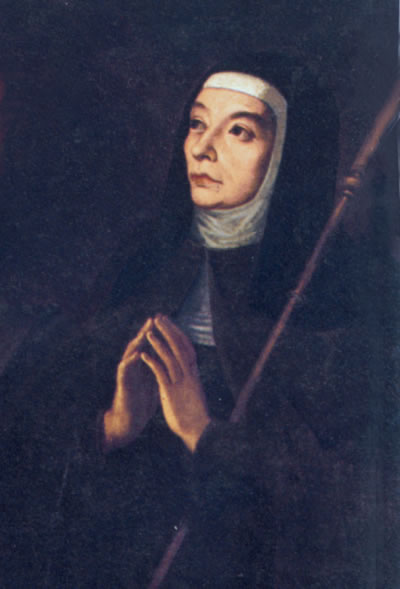

Virgin
- Born: September 1, 1592; Barcelona, Spain
- Died: December 2, 1665 (aged 73); Murcia, Spain
- Venerated in: Roman Catholic Church
- Beatified: 23 May 1982, St. Peter's Square by Pope John Paul II
- Attributes: Religious habit of a Capuchin Poor Clare, crozier, monstrance

Maria Angela Astorch (née Maria Ines Jerónima Astorch; 1 September 1592 – 2 December 1665) was a Spanish nun and mystic. Born in Barcelona, she founded the Capuchin Poor Clares of Zaragoza and Murcia. She died in Murcia and was beatified by Pope John Paul II on 23 May 1982.

== Early life ==
She was born into a comfortable family where she was the youngest of her four siblings. Her father, Cristóbal Cortey, sold books for a living; her mother, Catalina Astroch, was the universal heir of Pedro Miguel Astroch, under the stipulation that all of her offspring would keep her last name. Both parents died within four years, leaving Maria an orphan in the care of her housekeeper in Sarria.

In 1599 she was found poisoned and left for dead. Her sister Isabel Astorch, who was a nun in the newly founded Capuchin Monastery in Barcelona, attended the funeral with the founder of the monastery, Angela Serafin Prat. Amid preparations for the funeral Maria came back to life, the miracle was attributed to the prayers of her sister Angela.

After her revival she was observed to have acquired increased maturity and potential, giving the impression that she was a highly gifted child. She learned to read (especially books in Latin) and worked hard.

== Religious life ==
On 16 September 1603, at age 11, she entered the monastery of St. Margaret of Barcelona, founded by Mother Angela Serafina Prat. She did it with the six volumes of the Breviary in Latin, which she had already mastered. Despite her early maturity, she had to wait until 1608 for the recruitment to end, a wait made difficult by misunderstanding and envy of the teacher, who came to abuse her; eventually because of her maturity and culture, she was commissioned to give some training to their colleagues. In the end Mother Angela Serafina ended up deposing the master and putting in place Isabel Astorch, Maria Angela's sister. She became the teacher on 8 September 1609. In 1612 she was appointed to join the community council.

=== Foundation of Zaragoza ===
The monastery of Santa Margarita became a thriving focus of foundations. On 19 May 1614 Maria Angela was released, along with five others, to a religious foundation in Zaragoza, which opened on 24 May the same year.

During her years at Zaragoza, Maria Angela served as mistress of novices (1614-1623); teacher of young professed (1623-1626); and abbess (1626-1642), for which it was necessary to ask for dispensation to Rome because she was not of the minimum canonical age. At this time also she devoted herself to writing small works of a spiritual nature. One of her greatest accomplishments was getting approval from Pope Urban VIII in 1627, constitutions which governed the life of the Capuchins of Zaragoza and the derived monasteries for three centuries.

Other tasks performed by sister Maria Angela included meeting those who approached the monastery asking for advice or looking for consolation, including some bishops and Cardinal Teodoro Trivulzio, Aragon Viceroy, who would maintain the epistolary relationship to return to Italy.

=== Spiritual life ===
María Angela's spiritual progress has been preserved in the Autobiographical stories and Accounts of Spirit. In them she tells of mystical experiences that occurred between the years 1626-1656. One of the confessors commanded her to read mystics in vogue at the time - such as Teresa of Avila, John of the Cross, and Jesús Tomás - to see if she felt she identified any of them. María Angela's response was negative.

Her experience is similar to that of Saint Gertrude of Helfta. Pope John Paul II called her liturgical spirituality, scriptural and patristic, "the mystique of the Breviary" in his beatification, as well as a great devotion to the passion and the Sacred Heart of Jesus.

=== Foundation in Murcia ===
In 1640 Sister Maria Angela was considering the possibility of founding again. It was not until 9 June 1645, that she would be accompanied by four others to Murcia. On 29 June of the same year the monastery of the exaltation of the Holy Sacrament was opened. Maria Angela was again the master of novices and Abbess. Among his disciples was Sor Úrsula Micaela Morata, who would be the founder of the monastery of Alicante in 1672. During her years in Murcia Maria Angela had to face difficult moments, especially the plague of 1648 and overflows of the river Segura in 1651 and 1653.

== Death and beatification ==
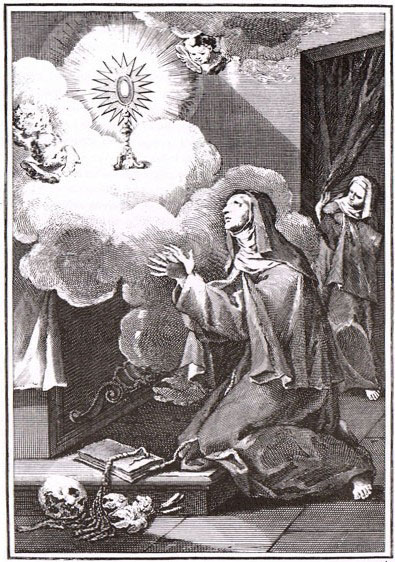
An engraving of Maria Angela Astorch made in the 18th century

In 1655 Maria Angela stopped writing with the thought of her upcoming death. She had begun losing mental faculties in 1660, regressing to a childlike state. In 1661, she resigned from the position of Abbess. On 21 November 1665, she suffered a hemiplegia, never fully regaining her mental faculties. She died on December 2 of that year after receiving the sacraments. The city of Murcia turned out to her burial, as the people had great esteem for the "mother foundress", as she was popularly known. She was given a burial on land, in the bass choir.

The Diocesan process for her beatification was begun in 1668, concluding in 1670. In 1683, with permission of the Bishop, her body was exhumed and placed in a niche in the presbytery of the Church. Her body was examined, and they discovered that it remained uncorrupted. Further reviews took place in 1725, 1729 and 1745. A new Diocesan process for her beatification occurred between 1759 and 1771, along with new surveys of the corpse.

The cause for her beatification was formally opened in Rome on 19 June 1776. The promulgation of the Decree of approval of the writings took place in 1773, with the enactment of a second decree of approval taking place in 1776. On 29 September 1850, Maria Angela was declared officially Venerable.

In 1936, the process was halted due to the outbreak of the Spanish Civil War. Her grave was desecrated and the corpse was taken to the common cemetery, but it was possible to identify it at the end of the war in 1939, thanks to the boldness of a stonemason who separated the remains from those of others, and to Placido Ruiz Molina, the doctor who had observed the corpse before the desecration. In 1979 he returned to present the already approved miracle. New doctors studying it, giving a favourable opinion on 21 February 1980. On 23 May 1982 Maria Angela was beatified by Pope John Paul II in St. Peter's Square.

== See also ==
- Chronological list of saints and blesseds in the 17th century
