= Joachim Royo =

Roman Catholic priest and saint

Saint Joachim Royo
- Born: 1691; Hinojosa de Jarque, Spain
- Died: October 28, 1748 (aged 56–57)
- Cause of death: Martyrdom
- Beatified: 1893 by Pope Leo XIII
- Canonized: 2000 by Pope John Paul II

Joachim Royo (Spanish: Joaquin Royo Pérez, Chinese name: 华雅敬; 1691 – October 28, 1748) was a Spanish Catholic missionary in China during the 18th century. He died as a martyr in 1748 and was later canonized by the church as a saint.

== Life ==
He was born in 1691 in Hinojosa de Jarque in Spain and baptized on October 3, 1691. His father was Joachim Royo and his mother was Marianna Pérez.

He joined the Dominican Order in Spain and received his habit in 1709 at the Priory of Our Lady of the Pillar in Valencia. He accompanied Peter Sanz and other religious when they departed from Spain for the Philippines in 1712.

He was ordained to the priesthood in 1715 and sent to the missions in China. He first served as a missionary in Macao and then later in Fu'an. He served also in the area around Xiamen and Quanzhou.

In 1717, he was sent to do mission in the provinces of Jiangxi and Zhejiang, which had not seen western missionaries for decades. In 1722, he returned to Fujian, where he was made the vicar provincial.

During a period of persecution, he continued to work in China clandestinely. He was captured by authorities in 1746. He was tortured in prison and executed by being suffocated with a sack of lime over his head. He died on October 28, 1748.

== Canonization ==
He was beatified on May 14, 1893, by Pope Leo XIII and canonized along with other martyrs of China on October 1, 2000, by Pope John Paul II
