= Agnes Takeya =

Korean-Japanese Roman Catholic martyr (1580–1622)

Blessed Agatha Takeya
- Born: 1580
- Died: 1622 (aged 41–42); Japan
- Venerated in: Roman Catholic Church
- Beatified: 1867
- Feast: September 10

Agnes Takeya (イネス竹屋; 1580–1622) was a Korean-Japanese Roman Catholic martyr.

Takeya was born in Korea in 1580. During the 1592–1598 Japanese invasions of Korea, she was kidnapped, enslaved, and taken to Japan. There, she was converted to Christianity. Takeya was married to another Catholic layperson, Cosmas Takeya Sozaburō, another Korean who had been similarly enslaved and taken to Japan. They were beheaded, with Charles Spinola and companions, during the "Great Genna Martyrdom" at Nagasaki. She was beatified in 1867.

== See also ==
- Martyrs of Japan
