= Caius of Korea =

Korean Catholic martyr (1571–1624)

- Born: 1571, Korea
- Died: 15 November 1624, Nagasaki, Japan
- Martyred by: Tokugawa Shogunate
- Means of martyrdom: Burnt at the stake
- Venerated in: Catholic Church
- Beatified: 7 July 1867, Rome, by Pope Pius IX
- Feast: 15 November

Caius of Korea (1571 in Korea – 15 November 1624 in Nagasaki, Japan) is the 128th of the 205 Catholic Martyrs of Japan beatified by Pope Pius IX on 7 July 1867, after he had canonized the Twenty-six Martyrs of Japan five years before on 8 June 1862.

The 19th century French Catholic missionary Claude-Charles Dallet wrote of him in his A history of the church in Korea, "His history proves, in a dazzling way, that God would rather make a miracle than abandon an infidel who follows the lights of his conscience, and seeks the truth with an upright and docile heart."

== Biography ==
Caius was born in Korea and was given to a Buddhist monastery by his parents. He left the monastery because he could not find the peace he wanted there and went to a mountain to live as a hermit. According to Dallet, "He withdrew into solitude to meditate with more ease on this happiness which he sought. He had as a dwelling only a cave, which he shared with a tiger, which occupied it before him. This wild animal respected its guest; it even yielded the cave to him some time after, and withdrew elsewhere."

Caius only ate what was necessary to preserve his life, abstaining from anything that was not absolutely necessary to live. One night, while in meditation, a man of "majestic aspect" appeared to him, and said to him, "Take courage; within one year you will traverse the sea, and, after much work and fatigue, you will obtain the object of your desire."

In 1592, Japan invaded Korea, and Caius was taken prisoner. On the journey to Japan, they were shipwrecked at Tsushima Island, and Caius, near death, was taken to Kyoto. A Christian named Caius Foyn, the father of his mistress, nursed him back to health.

Allured by the life of the Buddhist monks, he felt that he had found what he had been seeking for many years, and went to live in one of the most famous pagodas in Kyoto. Again he felt that he could not find the peace that he wanted there, and he became ill. During his illness, he had a dream in which he saw the pagoda ablaze. Then a "child of a charming beauty" appeared to him in his dream, comforting him, saying, "Fear no more, you are close to obtaining the happiness you desire."

He found himself cured after the dream. In The Victories of the Martyrs by Saint Alphonsus de Ligouri, it is said that: "One day during sleep it seemed to him that the house was on fire: a little while afterwards a young child of ravishing beauty appeared to him, and announced to him that he would soon meet what he desired; at the same time he felt himself quite well, though he had been sick. Despairing of seeing among the bonzes the light for which he was longing, he resolved to leave them."

Caius then left the temple and went back to his master, who introduced him to a Christian, who in turn introduced him to some Jesuit priests. He converted to Catholicism and was baptised immediately. While he was instructed, one of the priests showed him a tableau representing Jesus Christ, at which Caius is said to have exclaimed, "Oh! Voila! Here is who appeared to me in my cave, and who foretold all that happened to me."

Caius served the sick, especially lepers. In 1614, he went to the Spanish Philippines to work as a servant to Dom Justo Takayama, a samurai who had been exiled for his Catholic faith. After Takayama died in 1615, Caius returned to Japan, and resumed his duties as a catechist. He helped the missionaries by preaching in his native language to the Koreans who had been taken to Japan after the Japanese invasion of Korea, as well as to the Japanese.

On 15 November 1624, Caius was burnt at the stake with James Coici (Koichi), a Japanese Catholic, after he was arrested for harbouring missionaries.
