= Francis Diaz =

Spanish missionary in China during the 18th century

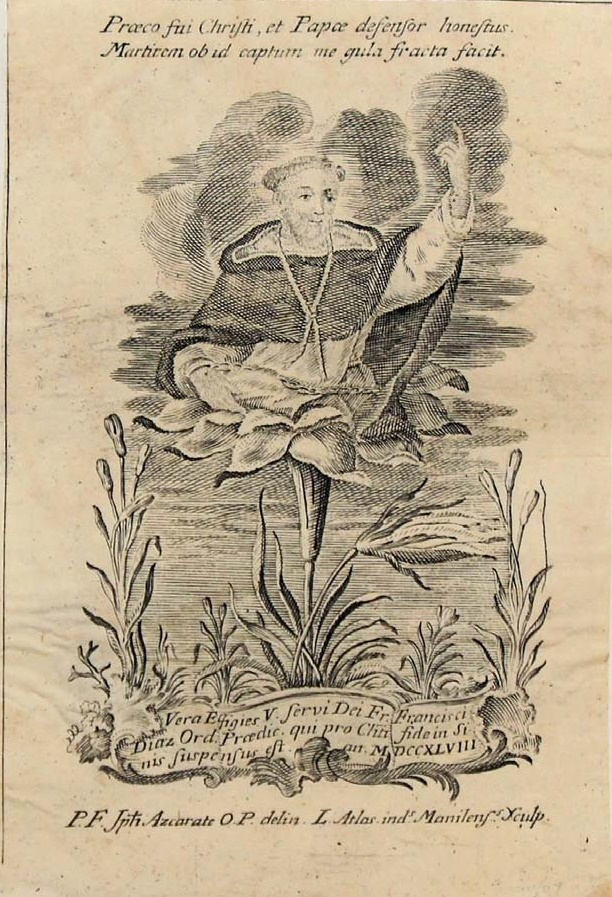

Francis Diaz (Spanish: Francisco Diaz del Rincon, Chinese name: 施方济; October 12, 1713 – October 28, 1748) was a Spanish missionary in China during the 18th century. He died in 1748 and was ultimately canonized.

== Life ==
He was born on October 12, 1713, in Écija, Spain. His parents were Juan Díaz and Isabel María Rincón y Rico.

He joined the Dominican Order in 1730 and entered the Convent of Saint Paul and Saint Dominic in Ecija. He suffered from a health problem that affected his eyes and made it difficult for him to study. As a result, he only studied moral theology.

He felt a calling to be a missionary and in 1736, he left Spain to travel to Manila in the Spanish Philippines. He completed his studies there and was ordained to the priesthood in Manila.

In 1738 he went to China to serve as a missionary. He arrived first in Macao before going to Fujian. During this time foreign missionaries were prohibited from seeking to expand the Catholic Church in China, which meant that the work of Francis and other Dominicans was illegal. He and other missionaries, however, clandestinely travelled around to preach and serve the Catholic community in nonviolent resistance to the laws passed by the Manchu Dynasty.

In 1746, he was arrested and imprisoned by local authorities. He was tortured in prison and executed by strangulation along with his fellow Dominicans on October 28, 1748.

== Canonization ==
He was beatified on May 14, 1893, by Pope Leo XIII and canonized along with other martyrs of China on October 1, 2000, by Pope John Paul II
