= Thomas Welbourne =

English Roman Catholic teacher and martyr

Thomas Welbourne (Welbourn) (born Hutton Buscel, North Riding of Yorkshire - executed at York, 1 August 1605) was an English Roman Catholic teacher. He is a Catholic martyr, beatified in 1929.

== Life ==
All that is known about Welbourne comes from details collected by Richard Challoner, in early Catholic catalogues of martyrs:

Thomas Welbourne was a school-master, a native of Kitenbushel in Yorkshire; and John Fulthering was a layman of the same county, who being zealous Catholics, and industrious in exhorting some of their neighbours to embrace the Catholic faith, were upon that account arraigned and condemned to suffer as in cases of high treason (II, 12).

Fellow Yorkshireman, John Fulthering, was executed with Thomas Welbourne.

Neither name occurs in Peacock's Yorkshire Catholics in 1604.
