= Hinojosa de Jarque =

- municipality
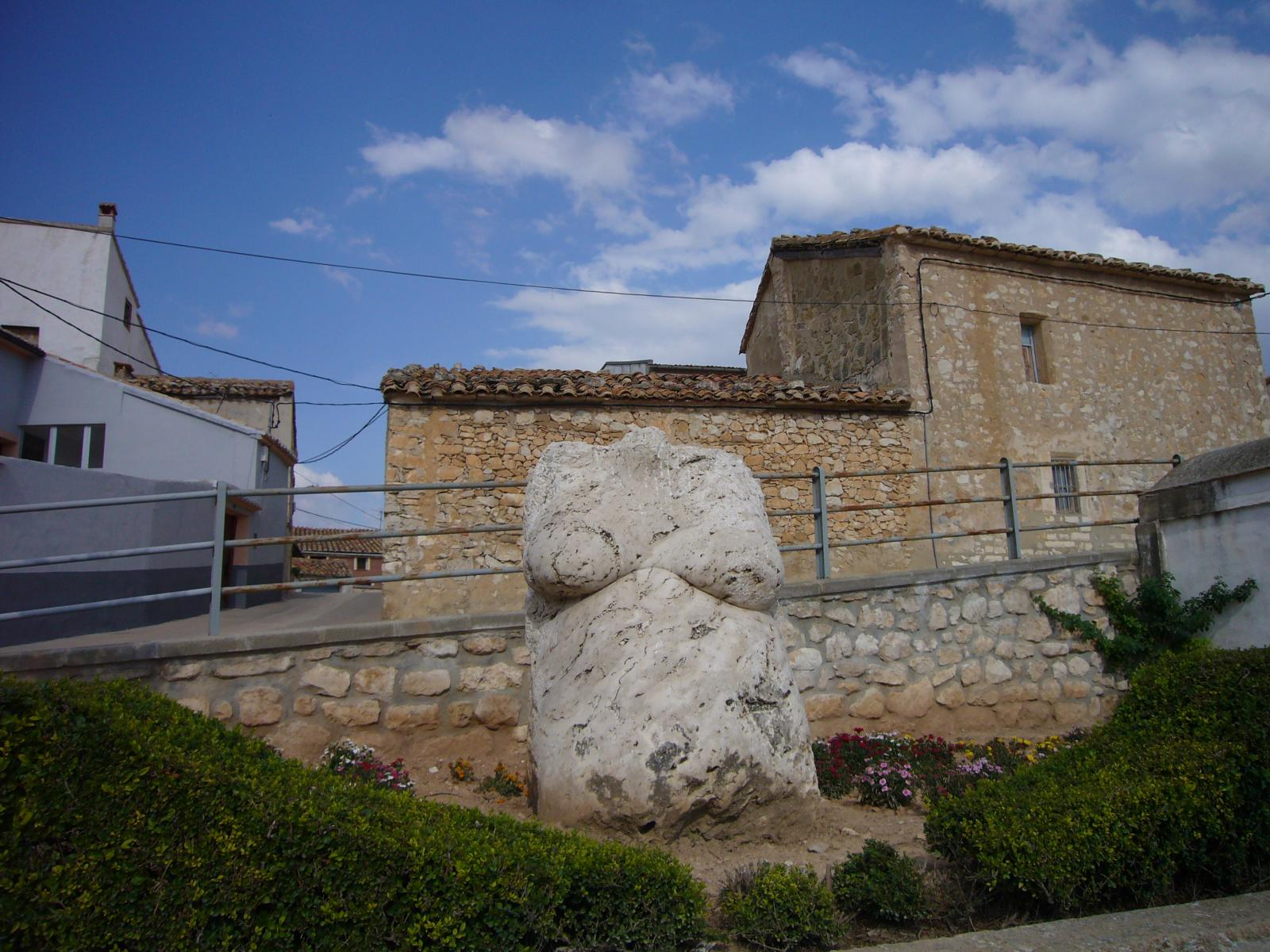

- Location within Spain
- Coordinates: 40°41′N 0°47′W
- Country: Spain
- Autonomous community: Aragon
- Province: Teruel
- Municipality: Hinojosa de Jarque

Area
  - Total: 36 km^{2} (14 sq mi)
- Elevation: 1,224 m (4,016 ft)

Population (2025-01-01)
  - Total: 104
  - Density: 2.9/km^{2} (7.5/sq mi)
- Time zone: UTC+1 (CET)
  - Summer (DST): UTC+2 (CEST)

Hinojosa de Jarque is a municipality located in the province of Teruel, Aragon, Spain. It has a population of 104 (register office, 2025).

== See also ==
- List of municipalities in Teruel
