= Vincent Shiwozuka =

Japanese Dominican martyr (1576–1637)

- Born: ヴイセンテ デ ラ クルス塩塚; 1576; Nagasaki, Japan
- Died: September 29, 1637; Nishizaka Hill, Nagasaki, Japan
- Cause of death: decapitation
- Honored in: Roman Catholic Church
- Beatified: February 18, 1981, Manila, Philippines by John Paul II
- Canonized: October 18, 1987, St. Peter's Square, Vatican City by John Paul II
- Feast: September 28

Saint Vincent Shiwozuka of the Cross (1576 - September 29, 1637) was a Japanese Dominican martyr and was one of the 16 Martyrs of Japan.

== Early life ==
Vincent was born to a Catholic Japanese family in Nagasaki sometime around 1576. When Vincent was 9-years-old he began his studies with Jesuit missionaries and later became a catechist for the order. On January 27, 1614, Shogun Tokugawa issued an order expelling all missionaries from Japan, among those removed from Japan, was Vincent.

== Life in Manila ==
As a result of Tokugawa's order, Vincent continued his studies in Manila in the Philippines. In 1619, Vincent was ordained a priest. He wanted to return to Japan, but a serious illness prevented him. He then became a Franciscan tertiary, began teaching Japanese to missionaries planning to go to Japan, and served as a priest among the Japanese living in Manila. In 1636, another opportunity arose to return to his homeland. Before leaving the Philippines, he requested admission to the Dominican Order.

He then set out on a mission to Japan with Dominicans: Antonio Gonzalez, William Courtet, and Michael de Aozaraza, and two laymen: Lorenzo Ruiz and Lazarus of Kyoto. At that time, persecution of Christians continued in Japan. They arrived in Okinawa at the end of June 1636 and faced heavy persecution and were captured by Japanese authorities almost immediately. The men were held for almost a year until, September 13, 1637. On that day, Vincent, Courtet and de Aozaraza were taken to Nagasaki in cages, upon there arrival, they were offered money to apostatize which they refused. However, Under their influence, he declared that he was renouncing his faith, but his torturers ignored him and continued the torture. Upon returning to his cell, he began to regret his moment of weakness. He never renounced his faith again and was therefore sentenced to death.

== Death ==
On September 29, 1637, Vincent was taken to Nishizaka Hill and was subjected to Ana-tsurushi, crucifixion, beatings and was finally beheaded.

== Canonization ==
He was beatified by John Paul II on February 18, 1981, in Manila, Philippines, along with Lorenzo Ruiz and companions. The same group of martyrs was canonized by John Paul II on October 18, 1987.
