= Bartholomew Gutierrez =

16th-century Augustinian and martyr

Blessed Bartolomé Gutiérrez Rodríguez
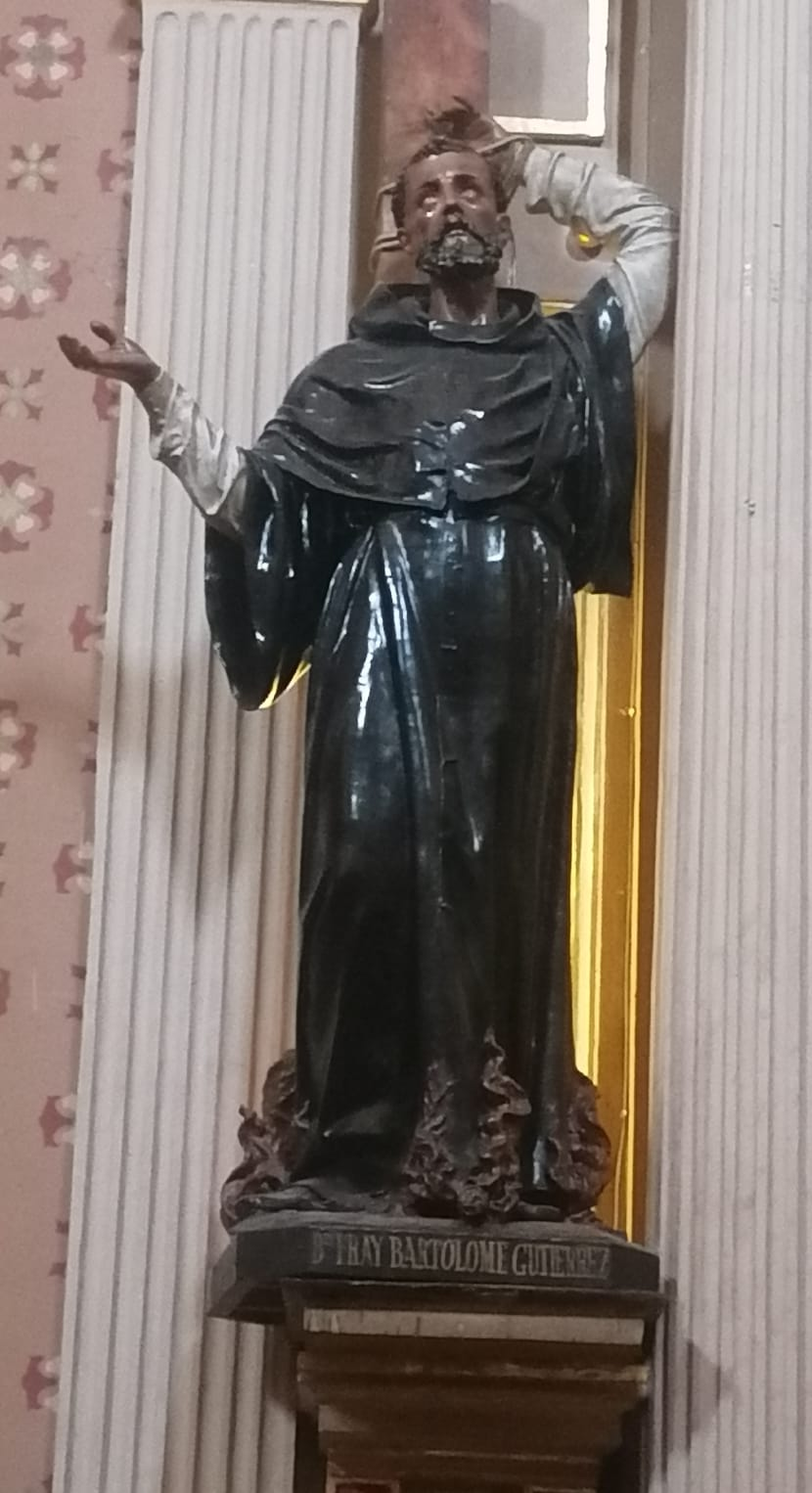
- Sculpture of Blessed Friar Bartolomé Gutierrez inside the Temple of San Agustín in the city of San Luis Potosí.
- Born: 1580; Mexico City, Mexico
- Died: 3 September 1632; Nishizaka, Nagasaki, Japan
- Venerated in: Roman Catholic Church
- Beatified: 7 May 1867 by Pope Pius IX
- Feast: 3 September

Bartolomé Gutiérrez Rodríguez (1580 Mexico City-1632 Nagasaki, Japan) was an Augustinian friar who was beatified in 1867.

== Life ==
He was born in Mexico City, the son of Alfonso Gutiérrez and his wife Ana Rodríguez. He joined the Order of St Augustine in 1596 at the age of sixteen. He was ordained a priest and sent to Puebla, but wished to become a missionary. His colleagues teased him because of his corpulence, but he was undeterred.

In 1605 he left from Acapulco for Manila, where he became master of novices. He left for Japan in 1612, where he served as prior to the Augustinians of Osaka. Two years later, he and other missionaries, were expelled from the country. He returned to Japan with Peter Zuniga and resumed his ministry while avoiding the priest hunters for twelve years.

He was arrested in 1629 and imprisoned in Omura. Bartholomew Gutierrez is mentioned as one of 205 martyrs of Japan. He was scalded in boiling water then burnt alive in Nagasaki.
