= Jerome de Angelis =

Italian Jesuit missionary to Japan (1567–1623)

Blessed Jerome de Angelis SJ
- Born: 1567; Castro-Giovanni, Kingdom of Sicily, Spanish Empire
- Died: 4 December 1623 (aged 55–56); Edo, Tokugawa shogunate
- Cause of death: Execution by burning during the Great Martyrdom of Edo
- Beatified: 7 July 1867 by Pope Pius IX
- Patronage: Enna

Jerome de Angelis (Italian: Girolamo degli Angeli, 1567 – 4 December 1623) was an Italian Jesuit missionary to Japan. He was beatified in 1867.

== Life ==
He was born Girolamo degli Angeli at Castro-Giovanni, Sicily. He studied law in Palermo before entering the Society of Jesus at Messina in 1586. He was assigned to the Japanese mission and left Lisbon in April 1596, in company with 7 other Jesuits destined for Japan. Storms disrupted his journey and took him to Brazil, Puerto Rico and England (after being captured by an English ship). He and Charles Spinola spent 2 months together in England before getting back to Lisbon in January 1598.

He set out again in 1599 with Charles Spinola and three others, bound for the College in Goa, to complete his studies in anticipation of ordination.

Degli Angelis arrived in Nagasaki in 1602 and worked in the area of what is now Tokyo. He remained there after the publication of the edict expelling all Christian missionaries from the country in 1614.

In 1618, the first European on Hokkaido, he was the first missionary to reach Yezo and the Ainu people. De Angelis, after making many converts to Christianity, seeing that his neophytes were cruelly persecuted because of his presence among them and his preaching, gave himself up to the authorities in 1623. Condemned to death, he underwent public execution by fire on 4 December 1623 during the Great Martyrdom of Edo.

== Veneration ==
De Angelis's sainthood cause was opened after his death. He was later beatified.
