= Giordano Ansalone =

Italian Roman Catholic saint

Saint Giordano Ansalone OP
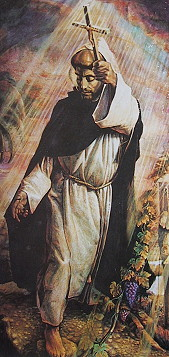
- San Giacinto Giordano Ansalone
- Born: 1 November 1598; Santo Stefano Quisquina, Kingdom of Sicily
- Died: 17 December 1634 (aged 36); Nagasaki, Japan
- Cause of death: Tsurushi
- Venerated in: Roman Catholic Church
- Beatified: 18 February 1981, Rizal Park, Manila, Philippines by Pope John Paul II
- Canonized: 18 October 1987, St. Peter's Square, Vatican City by Pope John Paul II
- Feast: 17 November

Giordano di San Stefano Ansalone, OP (1598 – 17 November 1634) was an Italian Dominican missionary in Asia. He is a Catholic martyr, beatified in 1981 and canonized in 1987 by Pope John Paul II.

== Life ==
Ansalone was born at Santo Stefano Quisquina in Sicily. Having entered the Dominican Order and completed his studies at Salamanca, he was sent in 1625, together with many others, as a missionary to the Philippine Islands. Whilst serving as chaplain in a hospital for Chinese and Japanese at Manila he learned their languages.

In 1631, he offered to go to Japan and arrived at the outbreak of the persecution in 1632. Disguised as a bonze, he travelled over the land and administered the rites of the Catholic religion.

He was arrested 4 August 1634, and subjected to tortures that lasted seven days. He was forced to witness the beheading of his companion, Thomas of St. Hyacinth, and sixty-nine other Christians. On 18 November he was executed at Nagasaki, Japan, by being suspended till dead from a plank with his head buried in the ground.

== Works ==
Whilst detained in Mexico, on his way to the Philippine Islands, he wrote in Latin a series of lives of Dominican saints after a similar work by Hernando del Castillo. He left at Manila an unfinished treatise on Chinese religion.
