= Thomas of Zumárraga =

17th-century Spanish missionary executed in Japan

Blessed Thomas of Zumárraga OP
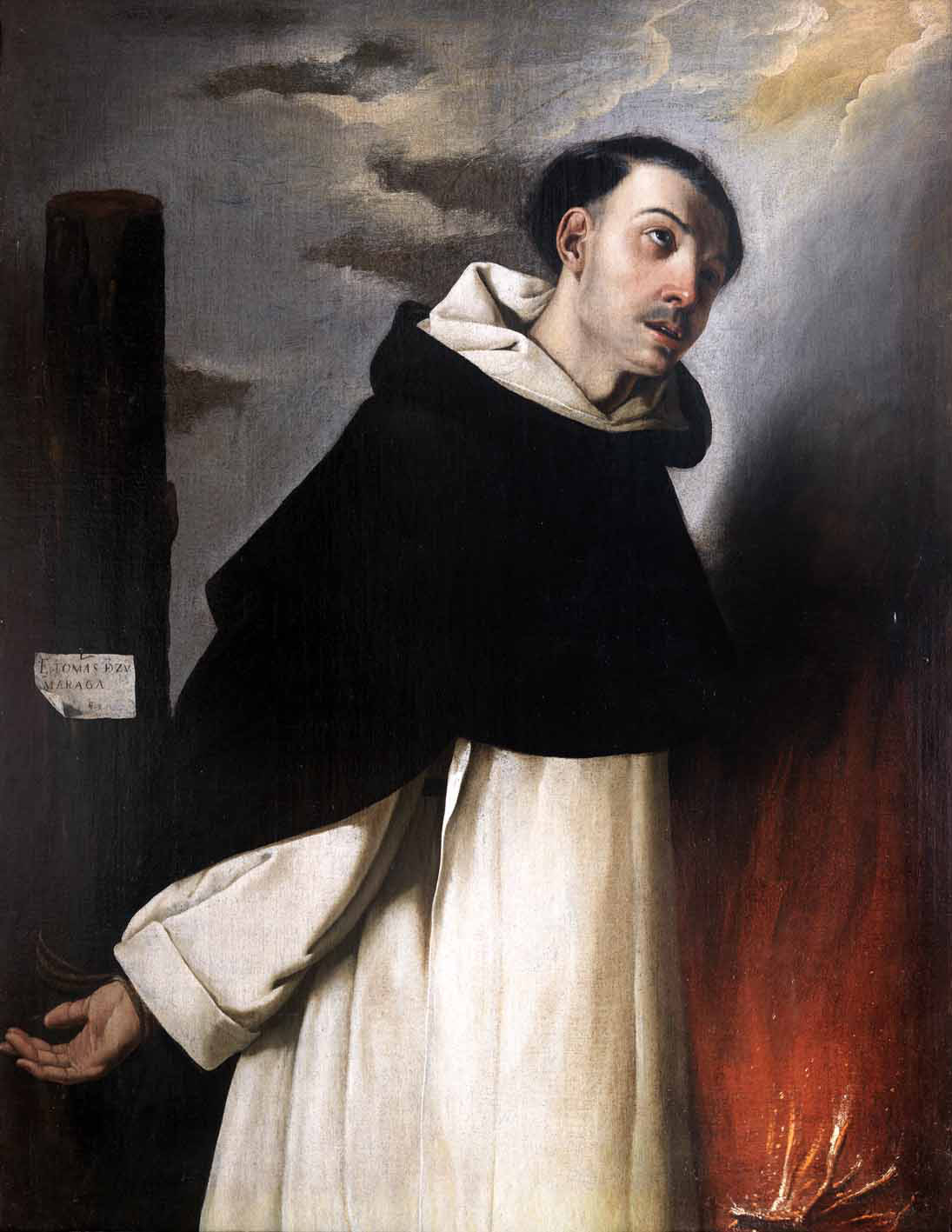
- Tomás de Zumárraga painted by Zurbarán.
- Born: 9 March 1577; Vitoria, Spain
- Died: 12 September 1622; Ōmura, Japan
- Cause of death: Burnt to death
- Venerated in: Catholic Church
- Beatified: 7 May 1867 by Pope Pius IX
- Feast: 12 September

Thomas of Zumárraga and Lazcano (Spanish: Tomás de Zumárraga y Lazcano; 9 March 1577 – 12 September 1622) was a Spanish Dominican friar, Catholic priest, missionary, and martyr of Japan. He was beatified in May 1867 by Pope Pius IX.

== Biography ==
Thomas was born in Vitoria, in 1577. In 1594, he was professed in the Order of Preachers in Vitoria. After he entered the Convento de San Esteban de Salamanca, he received the name of Fray Tomás del Espíritu Santo (Brother Thomas of the Holy Spirit). In 1601, he was sent to Mexico en route to the Philippines. Shortly after arriving, in 1603, Fray Francisco Morales, superior of the Dominicans in Manila, sent him to Japan to found a mission.

He hid in the mountains, in the area of Nagasaki and Ōmura. He was captured on 23 July 1617. After five years of imprisonment, he was burnt alive on 12 September 1622.
