= Martyrs of Japan =

Christian missionaries who were martyred in Japan

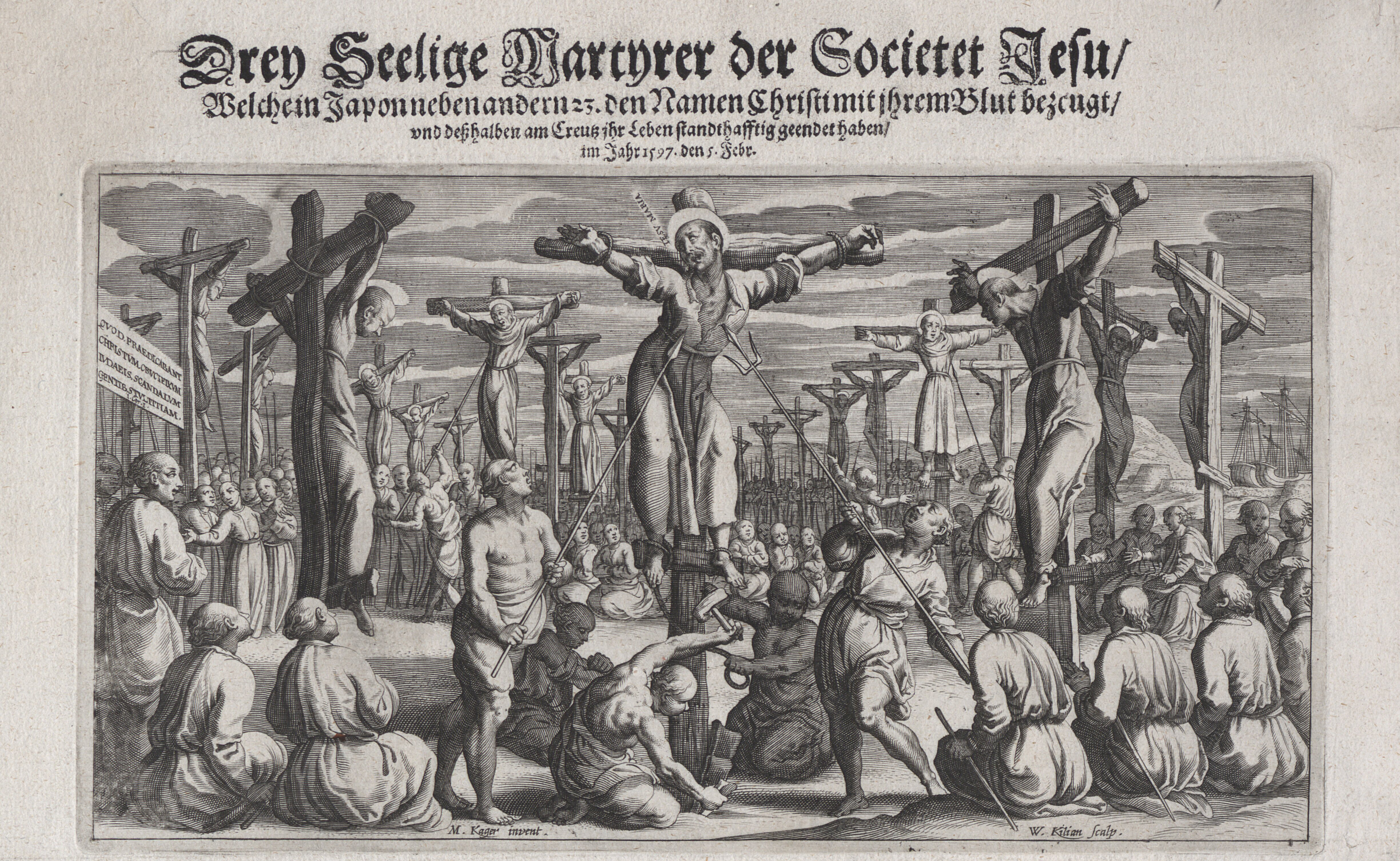
1628 German engraving of The 26 Martyrs of Japan at Nagasaki (note: German artists at the time did not know about the physical appearance of Japanese people, nor their culture or clothing; therefore, they appear European.)

The Martyrs of Japan (Japanese: 日本の殉教者, Hepburn: Nihon no junkyōsha) were Christian missionaries and followers who were persecuted and executed, mostly during the Tokugawa shogunate period in the 17th century. More than 400 martyrs of Japan have been recognized with beatification by the Catholic Church, and 42 have been canonized as saints.

== Early Christianity in Japan ==
Christian missionaries arrived with Francis Xavier and the Jesuits in the 1540s and briefly flourished, with over 100,000 converts, including many daimyōs in Kyushu. The shogunate and imperial government at first supported the Catholic mission and the missionaries, thinking that they would reduce the power of the Buddhist monks, and help trade with Spain and Portugal. However, the Shogunate was also wary of colonialism, seeing that the Spanish had taken power in the Philippines, after converting the population. It soon met resistance from the highest office holders of Japan. Emperor Ōgimachi issued edicts to ban Catholicism in 1565 and 1568, but to little effect. Beginning in 1587 with imperial regent Toyotomi Hideyoshi's ban on Jesuit missionaries, Christianity was repressed as a threat to national unity. While the non-Christian Japanese view was that Christians were persecuted and executed for being more loyal to Jesus than the Shogunate, the Catholic Church viewed them as martyrs: As the persecution was aimed at Christians as a group, and as they could escape only by abjuring their faith, the Catholic Church regarded the acts as being in odium fidei ("in hatred of the faith"), a principal factor in martyrdom. After the Tokugawa shogunate banned Christianity in 1614, it ceased to exist publicly. Many Catholics went underground, becoming hidden Christians (隠れキリシタン, kakure kirishitan), while others lost their lives. Only after the Meiji Restoration was Christianity re-established in Japan.

== 26 Martyrs of Japan (1597) ==
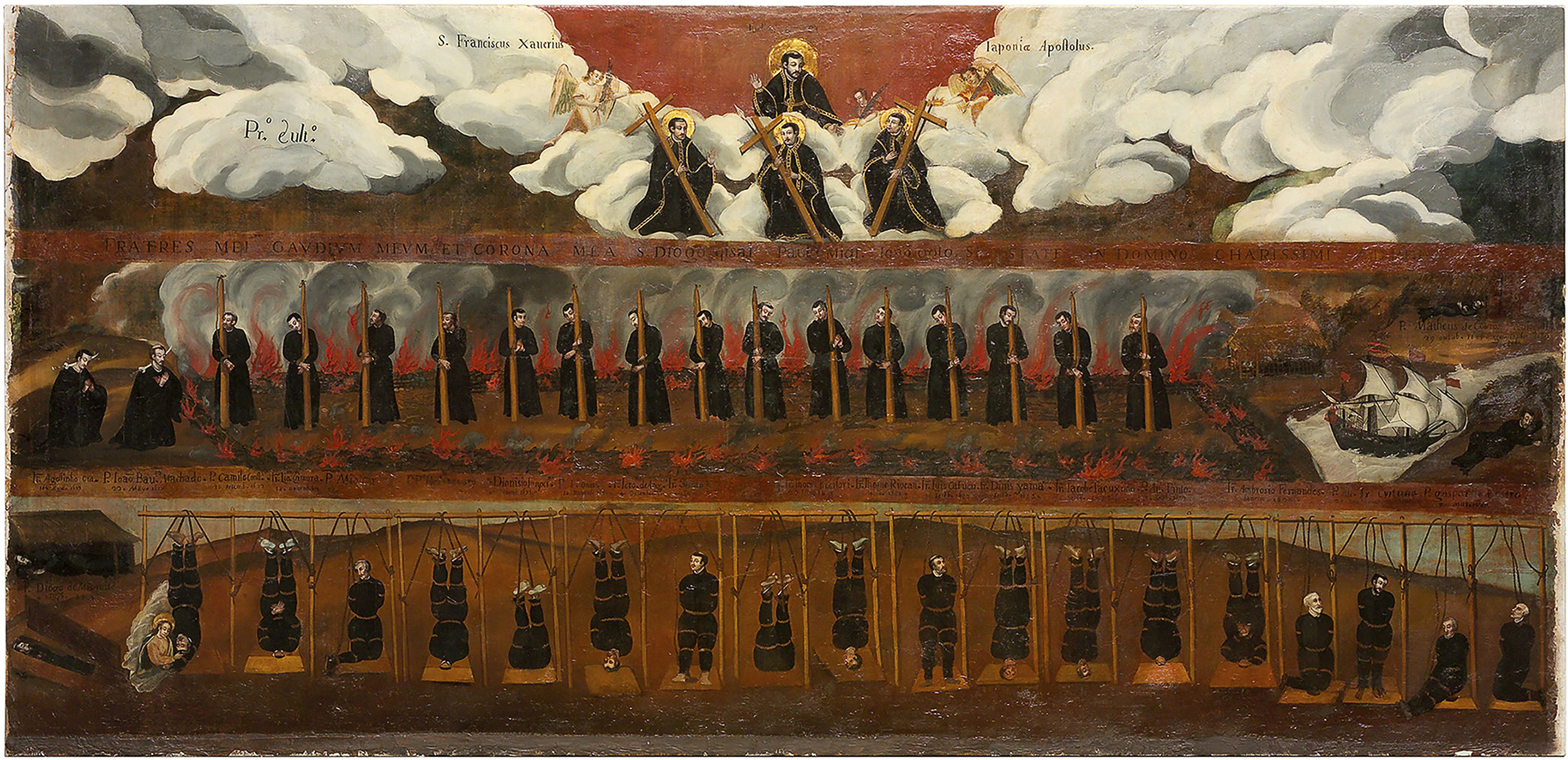
Martyrdom of Paul Miki and Companions in Nagasaki

The Twenty-six Martyrs of Japan (日本二十六聖人, Nihon Nijūroku Seijin) refers to a group of Christians who were executed by crucifixion after a forced march from Kyoto to Nagasaki. with the crucifixion taking place on 5 February 1597 at Nagasaki.

Through the promulgation of decree on martyrdom, these first Martyrs of Japan were beatified on 14 September 1627 by Pope Urban VIII. These saints were canonized saints on 8 June 1862 by Pope Pius IX.

== 205 Martyrs of Japan (1598–1632) ==
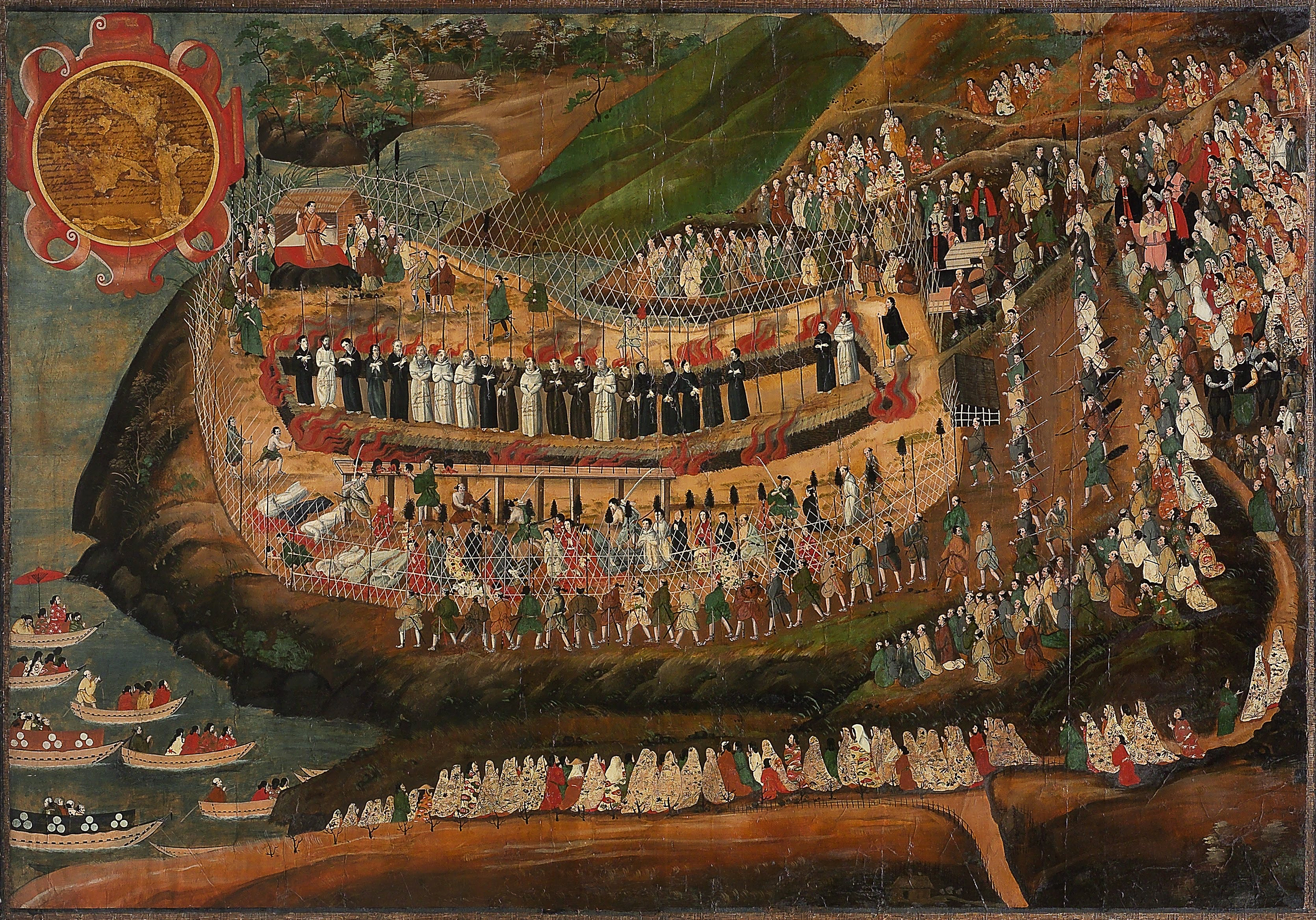
The Christian martyrs of the 1622 Great Genna Martyrdom. 16th/17th-century Japanese painting.

Persecution flared episodically and over a period of 15 years, between 1617 and 1632, 205 missionaries and native Christians are known to have been killed for their faith, 55 of them during the Great Genna Martyrdom, a further 50 during the Great Martyrdom of Edo (but only three were beatified as part of the 205 Martyrs of Japan). Christianity was proscribed and forced underground until the arrival of Western missionaries in the nineteenth century.

Through the promulgation of decree on martyrdom, these 205 Martyrs of Japan were venerated on 26 February 1866 and beatified on 7 May 1867, by Pope Pius IX.

== Augustine Recollects Martyrs (1632) ==
Two Spanish Augustinian Recollects arrived in Japan in the later half of 1632 from Manila to evangelize the Japanese. Upon arrival, Japanese authorities were notified by the Chinese merchants who had given them passage. They fled into the mountains where Dominican missionaries instructed them in the language of the country. When they descended into the city they were recognized and arrested in November 1632. On 11 December 1632, they were martyred for their faith.

Through the promulgation of decree on martyrdom, these two Augustinian Martyrs of Japan were venerated on 28 November 1988 and beatified on 23 April 1989, by Pope John Paul II.

== 16 Martyrs of Japan (1633–1637) ==
The martyrdom continued on with a group of missionaries and natives that belonged to the Philippine Province of the Dominican Order, called the Holy Rosary Province.

Through the promulgation of decree on martyrdom, these 16 Martyrs of Japan were venerated on 11 October 1980 and beatified on 18 February 1981, by Pope John Paul II. They were later canonized saints on 18 October 1987, by Pope John Paul II.

== 188 Martyrs of Japan (1603–1639) ==
These martyrs are additional religious priests and laity murdered for their faith between the years 1603 and 1639.

Through the promulgation of decree on martyrdom, these 188 Martyrs of Japan were venerated on 1 June 2007 and beatified on 24 November 2008, by Pope Benedict XVI. The ceremony, held in Nagasaki, was presided over by Cardinal Peter Shirayanagi, archbishop emeritus of Tokyo.

== See also ==
- Twenty-Six Martyrs Museum and Monument
- Christianity in Japan
- Roman Catholicism in Japan
- Nanban trade
- Silence (2016 film)
- Christianization
