= 16 Martyrs of Japan =

Christian martyrs from Japan

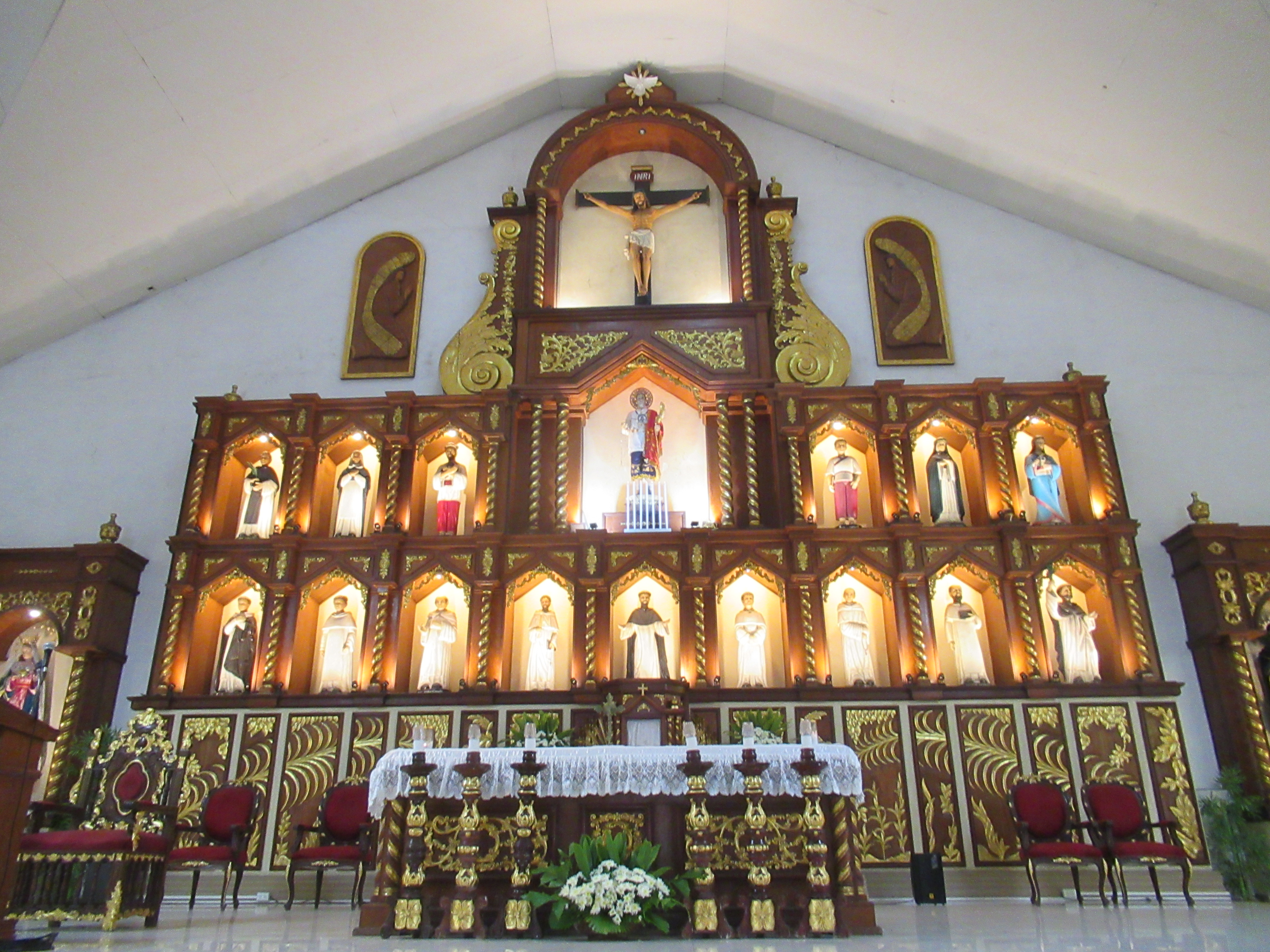
- Statues of the 16 Martyrs of Japan in the reredos of San Lorenzo Ruiz and Companions Parish Church Navotas City, Philippines
- Died: 1633 - 1637, Nagasaki, Japan
- Venerated in: Roman Catholic Church; Anglican Church; Lutheran Church
- Beatified: 18 February 1981, Rizal Park, Manila, Philippines, by Pope John Paul II
- Canonized: 18 October 1987, St. Peter's Square, Vatican City, by Pope John Paul II
- Major shrine: Binondo Church, Manila, Philippines
- Feast: 28 September

The 16 Martyrs of Japan (日本の殉教者, Nihon no junkyōsha) were Christians who were persecuted for their faith in Japan, mostly during the 17th century.

== Early Christianity in Japan ==
Christian missionaries arrived with Francis Xavier and the Jesuits in the 1540s and briefly flourished, with over 100,000 converts, including many daimyōs in Kyushu. The shogunate and imperial government at first supported the Catholic mission and the missionaries, thinking that they would reduce the power of the Buddhist monks, and help trade with Spain and Portugal. However, the Shogunate was also wary of colonialism, seeing that the Spanish had taken power in the Philippines, after converting the population. It soon met resistance from the highest office holders of Japan. Emperor Ogimachi issued edicts to ban Catholicism in 1565 and 1568, but to little effect. Beginning in 1587 with imperial regent Toyotomi Hideyoshi’s ban on Jesuit missionaries, Christianity was repressed as a threat to national unity. After the Tokugawa shogunate banned Christianity in 1620, it ceased to exist publicly. Many Catholics went underground, becoming hidden Christians (隠れキリシタン, kakure kirishitan), while others lost their lives. Only after the Meiji Restoration, was Christianity re-established in Japan.

The first group of martyrs, known as the Twenty-Six Martyrs of Japan (1597), were canonized by the Church in 1862 by Pope Pius IX. The same pope beatified the second group, known as the 205 Martyrs of Japan (1598–1632), in 1867.

== 16 Martyrs of Japan (1633–1637) ==
Another group of martyrs were investigated by the Vatican Curia's Congregation for the Causes of Saints (CCS) in 1980 and were beatified on 18 February 1981. Pope John Paul II canonized these 16 Martyrs of Japan as saints on 18 October 1987. This group is also known as Lorenzo Ruiz, Dominic Ibáñez de Erquicia Pérez de Lete, Iacobus Tomonaga Gorōbyōe, and 13 companions.

== Nakamachi Church ==
Statues of the 16 Martyrs were placed in the garden of Nakamachi Church in Nagasaki.

== Ordained Martyrs ==
=== Dominican Priests ===
==== Foreign Missionaries ====
- Dominic Ibáñez de Erquicia Pérez de Lete – 14 August 1633
- Luke Alonso|Luke of the Holy Spirit Alonso Gorda – 19 October 1633
- Jordan Ansalone – 17 November 1634
- Antonio Gonzalez – 24 September 1637
- Michael de Aozaraza – 29 September 1637
- Guillaume Courtet – 29 September 1637

==== Japanese ====
- Jacobo Kyushei Gorōbyōe Tomonaga de Santa María – 17 August 1633
- Thomas Rokuzayemon – 15 November 1634
- Vincent Shiwozuka – 29 September 1637

== Martyred Laity ==
=== Dominican Laity ===
==== Japanese Cooperator Brother ====
- Francis Shōyemon – 14 August 1633
- Matthew Kohiyoye|Matthew Kohioye – 19 October 1633

==== Foreign Missionaries – Confraternity of the Holy Rosary ====
- Lorenzo Ruiz – 29 September 1637

==== Japanese Tertiaries ====
- Marina of Omura – 11 November 1634. A woman who assisted the missionaries in Japan, she was arrested in 1634 and burned alive.
- Magdalene of Nagasaki – 16 October 1634

=== Christian Laity ===
==== Japanese Catechist ====
- Michael Kurobioye – 17 August 1633

==== Japanese ====
- Lazarus of Kyoto – 29 September 1637

== See also ==
- Martyrs of Japan
- Twenty-Six Martyrs Museum and Monument
- Christianity in Japan
- Roman Catholicism in Japan
- Nanban trade
