= Guillaume Courtet =

French Dominican priest

Saint Guillaume Courtet O.P.
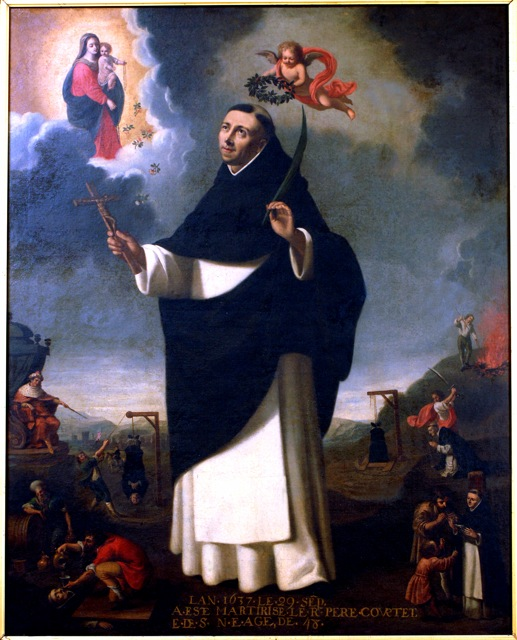
- Born: 1589-1590; Sérignan, Languedoc, France
- Died: 29th of September, 1637; Nagasaki, Hizen, Japan
- Cause of death: Beheading
- Venerated in: Catholic Church
- Beatified: 18 February 1981, Rizal Park, Manila, Philippines by Pope John Paul II
- Canonized: 18 October 1987, St. Peter's Square, Vatican City by Pope John Paul II
- Major shrine: Collégiale Notra-Dame-de-Grâce de Sérignan, Occitanie, France
- Feast: 28th September
Guillaume Courtet
- Education: Lycée Henri-IV; University of Toulouse
Signature
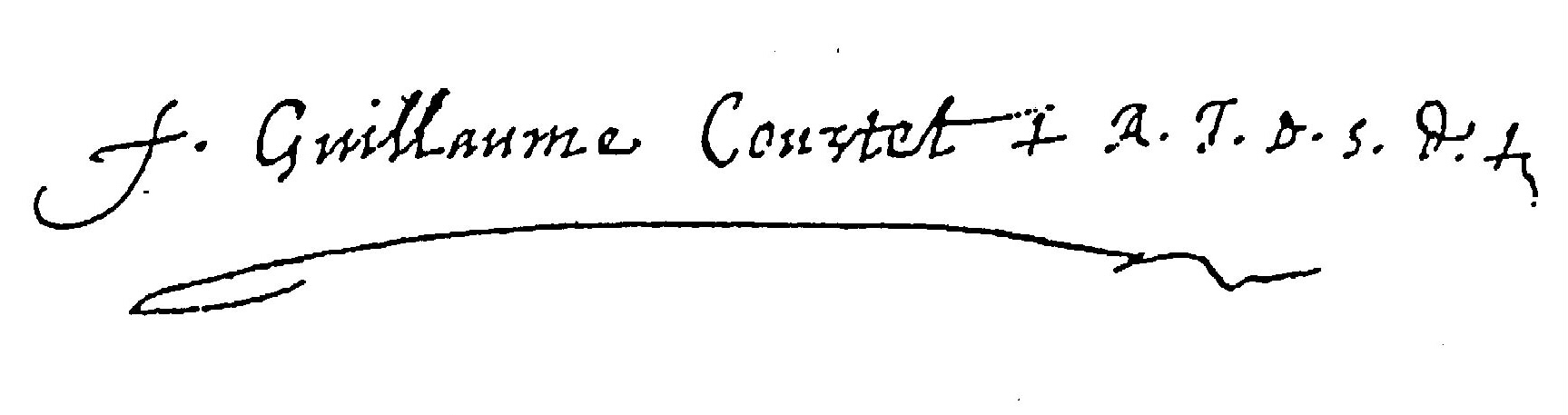

Guillaume Courtet, O.P. (French: [ɡijom kuʁtɛ]; 1589–1637) was a French Dominican friar, Catholic priest, and missionary. One of the first Frenchman to have visited Japan, he died as a martyr by beheading in Nagasaki at the hands of the Tokugawa Shogunate on Michaelmas Day 1637 after three days continuous torture. He was canonised by Pope John Paul II in 1987 as one of the 16 Martyrs of Japan. He is celebrated annually on the September 28th as one of the 16 and on November 6 as one of the Thomasian Martyrs.

== Life ==
=== Early life ===
Guillaume Courtet was born in 1589 or 1590 the little town of Sérignan (just inland from the coast on the Gulf of Lion) in Languedoc in the Kingdom of France, under the ecclesiastical administration of the Diocese of Béziers. He was one of at least four children of Jehan Courtet and Barbe Malaure. There is uncertainty about his birth date because the parish baptism register for that year does not survive. Local tradition holds a site in the Rue des Salanquiers as his birthplace.

He grew up in a chaotic political climate, 8 years before the Edict of Nantes, during the last years of the French Wars of Religion. His early life was also ruptured by bereavement at age 12 when his mother died. His family, however, were fairly prosperous and prominent burghers, his father’s name is recorded in civic documents as holding the role of "second consul" in local government, and Guillaume enjoyed a first rate education. He was clearly regarded as a responsible young man as he was recorded as a godparent of a child of seigneurial rank at the age of just 13.

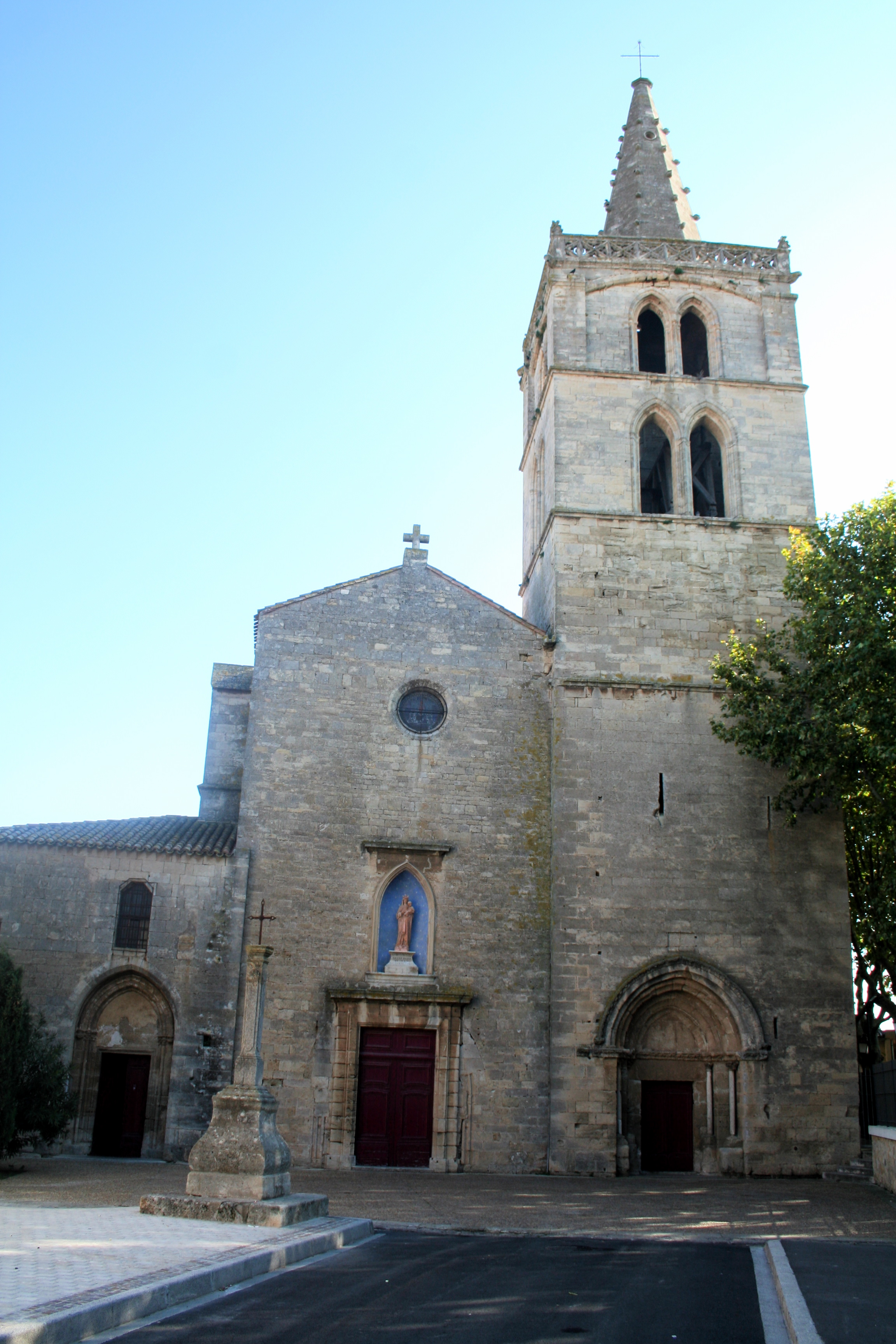
Collegiate Church of Our Lady of Grace, Sérignan

His first formal education was overseen by the Collage of Canons at the church of Our Lady of Grace in Sérignan. Sometime around his mothers death he began studies at the Jesuit school in Béziers, now Lycée Henri-IV, where he received a solid humanist education. It was probably here that his early vocation to the missions in the Far East also germinated as stories of 1597 martyrdoms of Paul Miki and his companions spread through the institutions of the Society of Jesus. He would later write about this early sense of vocation to overseas mission. At the age of 15 he left Béziers to continue studies at the University of Toulouse in scripture and scholastic philosophy and theology in preparation for an ecclesiastical career.

=== Dominican career ===
==== In the French Province ====
While at university, he chose to seek admittance as a postulant to the Order of Preachers, a religious order which had been founded by St Dominic in Languedoc around 400 years earlier. His name is recorded in the register of new novices at the Priory at Albi in 1607. He took his simple vows on the Feast of the Assumption (August 15) at the age of 17. He later returned to Toulouse for studies at the studium of the Toulouse Dominican Priory in preparation for the priesthood, notably the principle shrine of St Thomas Aquinas whose writings formed the bedrock of his priestly formation. As well as natural focus on Aquinas, Courtet also drew great inspiration from the strict monastic ideals of Sébastien Michaëlis who had been prior of Toulouse and was responsible for a widespread reform of the Dominican order across France, part of the Dominican response to wider reforms in religious life following the Council of Trent. In his later career Courtet himself would be responsible for furthering these reforms in more Dominican priories.

After his ordination, Courtet received a Licentiate of Sacred Theology at Toulouse at the early age of 22. This initiated his career of teaching and lecturing that would continue wherever he went for the rest of his life. Shortly afterwards his father died, in 1611. In 1624 he was elected superior of the famous Dominican Priory at Avignon, the first residence of the popes in the city during the early 14th century before the construction of the Palais des Papes. During his two years as prior ten postulants joined the order at the Avignon house.

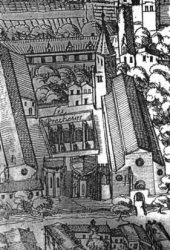
1616 engraving of the Avignon Priory where Courtet was prior 1624-1626

In 1626, Courtet was appointed "commissioner" of the Order of Preachers in Northern Europe with a difficult mission of spreading Michaëlis' reform of the monastic life of the friars in priories. These reforms were focused on poverty in the cell and wider prioral complex, on fasting and abstinence, on a rigorous devotion to the Liturgy of the Hours, and on silent meditation. During this Courtet was also active in the diplomatic field of the Thirty Years' War and was commended by the French statesman Cardinal Richelieu.

Inspired by stories from his Jesuit school days and new examples such as the Great Genna Martyrdom and the martyrdoms of his fellow Preaching Friars like Alfonso Navarrete (d. 1617), Thomas of Zumárraga (d. 1622), and Pedro Vásquez (d. 1624), mission to Japan was on his mind during this period. In a letter of 1628, 9 years before his martyrdom, he asked to be sent to mission fields where the church endured persecution. He anticipates the prospect of "enduring the torments to which I want to expose myself" adding that he had "always" had this desire.

==== In the Spanish Province ====
In the 17th century only the Spanish and Portuguese Empires could organise passage to the Far East and so Courtet sought a transfer to the Spanish Dominican Province. His superiors in both his own and the Spanish Provinces approved his request and in 1628 he arrived at the Priory of Our Lady of Atocha in Madrid. He changed his name in religion at this stage to Thomas de Santo Domingo in honour of both St Thomas Aquinas and St Dominic. He remained in Spain for another five years of formation in preparation for overseas mission. He also became confessor to the French Ambassador and spiritual director to the Queen of Spain (Isabelle Bourbon, daughter of Henry IV).

==== In the Philippine Province ====
At the end of 1634 Courtet was authorised with about twenty other religious to embark for the Philippines via New Spain. They arrived in Manila on June 24, 1635. While undertaking further preparations his for mission he became a professor lecturing at the University of Santo Tomas in Manila. In the end, he spent nearly two years in the Philippines and faced many difficulties in departing to Japan. The passage of missionaries from the Philippines to Japan was prohibited by the Governor-General who feared Japanese reprisals for continued missionary activity in spite of clear opposition. Courtet, who had to provide his own means of transportation, had his first covertly constructed boat destroyed by the authorities. Eventually he was able to procure the use of a junk in early summer 1636.

== Mission to Japan and martyrdom ==
=== Journey ===
On June 10, 1636 Guillaume Courtet, together with three other priests (Miguel de Ozaraza, Antonio González, and the Japanese Dominican Vincent Shiwozuka) and two laymen (the Philippine Lorenzo Ruiz and Japanese Lazarus of Kyoto), embarked on the journey to Japan. After a month at sea, the party disembarked in Japan at Okinawa on July 10, 1636.

=== Mission and imprisonment ===
Very little is known of Courtet’s brief mission. It is probable that he and his companions were directly responding to the many calls for priests that reached Manila from the 200,000 strong Kakure Kirishitan community. He was active in very clandestine circumstances for just over a month before being captured and imprisoned presumably celebrating the Eucharist and the sacrament of confession. He was spotted by an informant to authorities and arrested in an unknown location but probably not far from where he had landed. From there he was brought to Kagoshima where he was imprisoned for a year and then taken to Nagasaki for more intense torture.

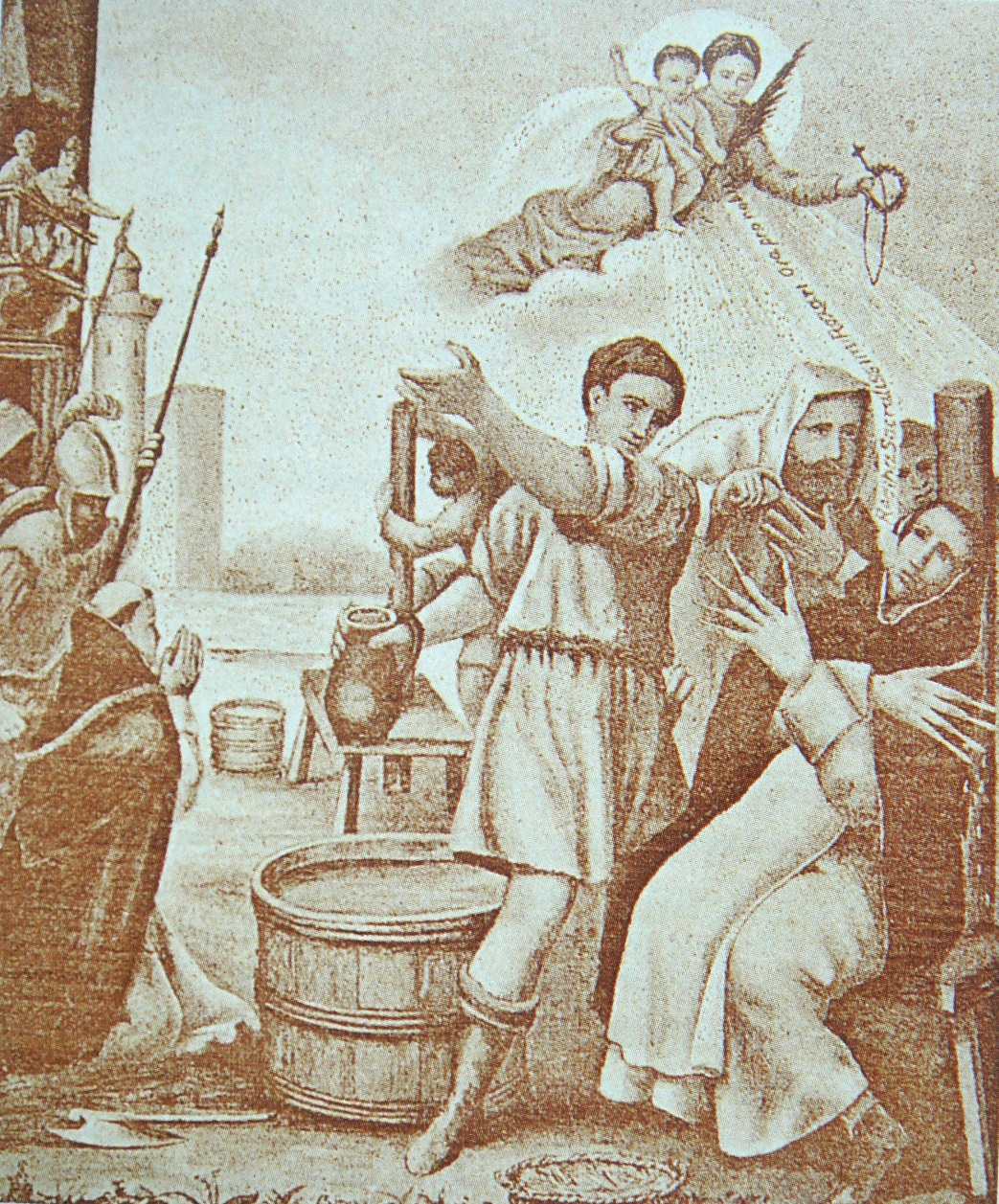
Martyrdom of Guillaume Courtet, in Nagasaki, 1637.

=== Martyrdom ===
On the 27th of September 1637 he and his companions were taken to Nishizaka Hill in Nagasaki for trial by torture, an attempt to make them apostatise. Notably, Nishizaka Hill was also the location of the martyrdoms of the 26 who’s stories had inspired Courtet as a boy. They were submitted to the "water torture", "torture of the awls" (needles under the fingernails), and the hanging torture of tsurushi. He remained true to his faith throughout the three day ordeal. In the evening on Michaelmas Day (29 September) 1637, he was removed from the tsurushi pit and beheaded along with the others who hadn’t already died from blood loss. A Portuguese Sailor witnessed the incident and provided the Dominicans of Manila with a record of the martyrs last words including Courtet’s.

"Father William, having heard, asked the translators to say on his part to the judges that it was not because they were enemies of life and had desire to die that they came to Japan; rather, the purpose of their journey was not to die there but to preach the Gospel of Jesus Christ the true God."

After their execution, the bodies of Courtet and his companions were immediately burnt to prevent them being venerated as relics. The ashes were then scattered at sea.

== Veneration ==
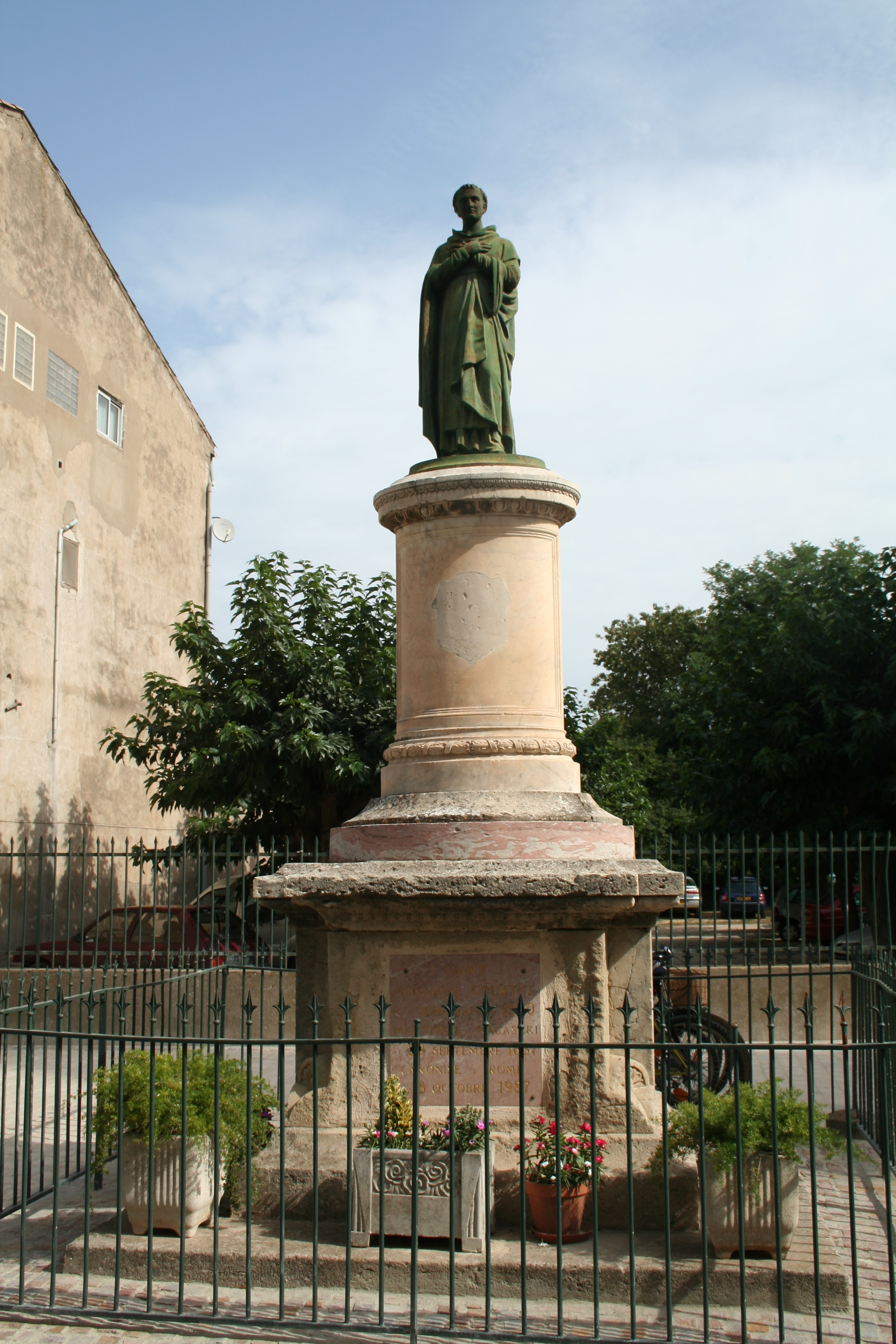
Statue of Guillaume Courtet, in Sérignan, erected in 1894.

=== Beatification and canonisation ===
The Positio Super Introductione Causae or the cause of beatification was authored by respected historian, Fidel Villarroel, which led to his beatification on February 18, 1981 during Pope John Paul II's visit to the Philippines. It was the first beatification ceremony to be held outside the Vatican in history.

Guillaume Courtet was canonised, together with another 15 martyrs of Japan, on October 18, 1987 by Pope John Paul II in St Peter's Square, at the Vatican in Rome.

=== Liturgical commemoration ===
Guillaume Courtet is commemorated in the Roman Martyrology on the 28th of September as one of the 16 Martyrs of Japan. He is also commemorated in the Dominican order on the 6th of November as one of the 17 Thomasian Martyrs.

=== Shrines ===
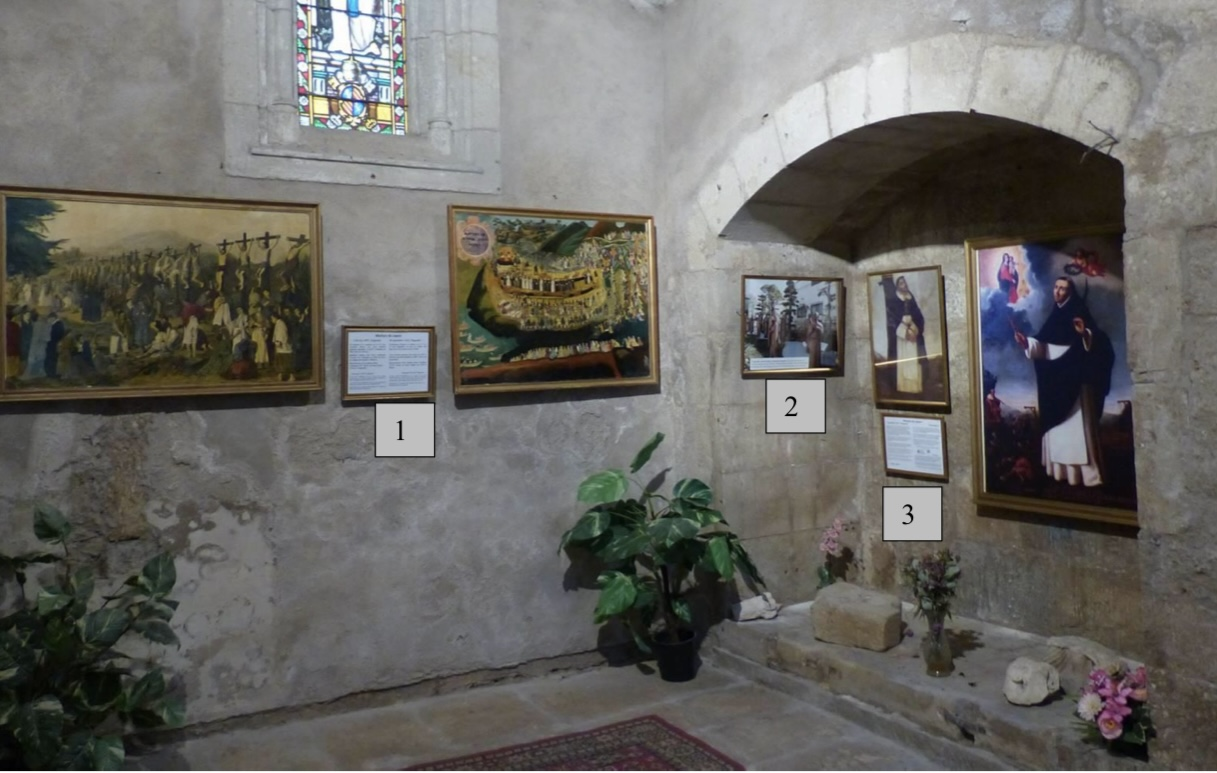
Shrine of Saint Guillaume Courtet and All Japanese Martyrs in the Collegiate Church of Notra-Dame-de-Grâce, Sérignan

His principal shrine is the Collegiate Church of Our Lady of Grace in Serignan, the principal church of his hometown where he was most likely baptised and where he was educated. He is also commemorated in the Far East, at Binondo Church (Shrine of the 16 Martyrs) and Santísimo Rosario Church (shrine of the Thomasian Martyrs) both in Manila, Philippines. In Japan, he is primarily commemorated on the site of his death in Nagasaki by the Twenty-Six Martyrs Museum and Monument.

=== Memorials ===
There is a statue of Courtet in his hometown near the site of his birth erected in 1894.

== See also ==
- France-Japan relations
