= Domingo Ibáñez de Erquicia =

Spanish Dominican priest and missionary

Saint Domingo Ibáñez de Erquicia OP
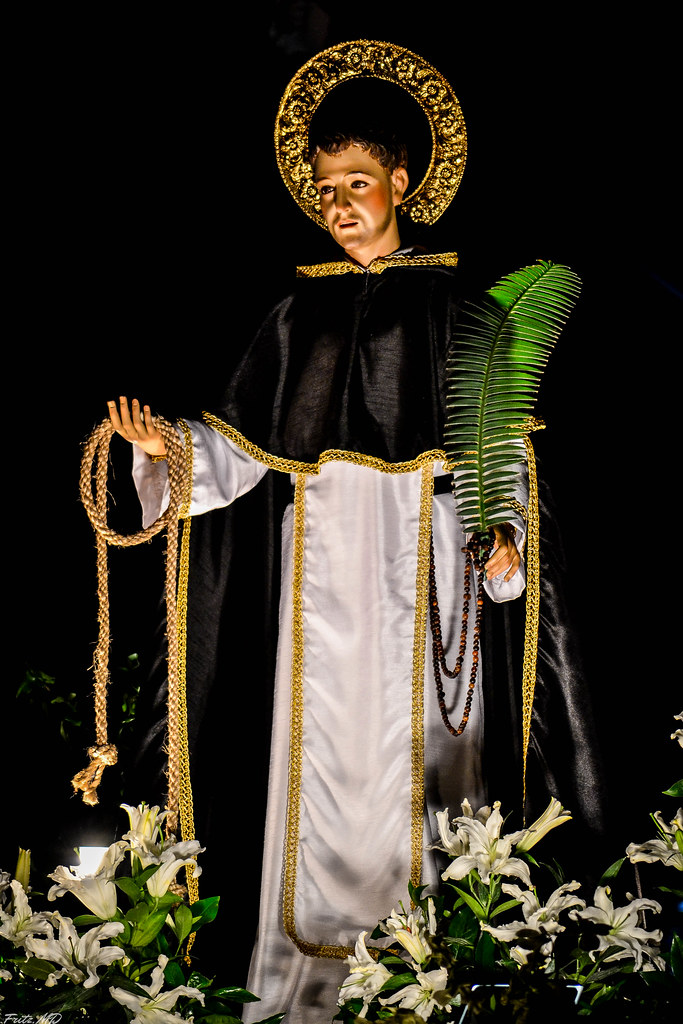
- Statue of Domingo Ibáñez de Erquicia in procession.
- Born: c. 1589; Régil, Guipúzcoa, Spain
- Died: 14 August 1633; Nagasaki, Japan
- Cause of death: Tsurushi
- Venerated in: Catholic Church
- Beatified: 18 February 1981, Manila, Philippines by Pope John Paul II
- Canonized: 18 October 1987, St. Peter's Basilica, Vatican City by Pope John Paul II
- Major shrine: Minor Basilica of the National Shrine of Saint Lorenzo Ruiz, Manila, Philippines
- Feast: 28 September

Domingo Ibáñez de Erquicia (c. 1589 – August 14, 1633) was a Spanish Dominican priest and missionary. After teaching at the Colegio de Santo Tomas in Manila, he went to Japan in 1623, where he ministered incognito to the Catholic community for about ten years. Betrayed by an apostate, he was captured and executed. His feast day is 28 September.

== Life ==
Domingo Ibáñez de Erquicia was born in Régil, Guipúzcoa, Spain. He entered the Dominican Order at the convent of San Telmo in the city of San Sebastián. He was professed in 1605. Having completed his theological studies, left Spain in 1610 for the Philippine mission by way of Mexico. He arrived in Manila in 1611 and was ordained the following year. He worked as missionary to Pangasinan in the north of the island of Luzon and then at Binondo, a settlement for Chinese immigrants who had converted to Catholicism. Later he was a professor of theology at the Colegio de Santo Tomas.

By 1622, the number of Dominican missionaries in Japan had declined due to the Tokugawa anti-Christian persecution. In response to requests for assistance, in 1623, Father Dominick departed for Japan disguised as a merchant. Not long after his arrival, a decree was issued banning Spaniards from residing in the country. He worked incognito among the Christians for about ten years, comforting them, reconciling the apostates, and administering the sacraments in painfully difficult circumstances. He conducted his ministry mainly at night, never remaining long in one place. In 1625, he was appointed provincial vicar and stayed in the north of the country for two years. The persecutions increased and many Christians fled to the mountains.

Constantly sought by the authorities, he was denounced to government officials by a Christian apostate in July 1633 and interned in the prison of Nagoya. Taken to Nagasaki, and after refusing to renounce his faith, he was placed in the torment of gallows and the pit on August 13, 1633, and died the next day.

Ibáñez was aided in his missionary efforts by Francis Shoyemon, a Japanese layman who later was received into the Order of Preachers as a Dominican Cooperator Brother. Shoyemon served as a catechist and translator, and when Ibáñez was imprisoned, Shoyemon was with him. It was while they were in prison that Ibáñez received Shoyemon into the Dominican Order as a cooperator brother. The two coworkers in the faith were put to death on the same day. His body was burned, and the ashes scattered.

== Veneration ==
The Positio Super Introductione Causae or the cause of beatification was authored by historian, Fidel Villarroel, which led to his beatification during Pope John Paul II's papal visit to the Philippines. It was the first beatification ceremony to be held outside the Vatican in the modern era (often during the Middle Ages beatifications were delegated to papal legates).

== See also ==
- Lorenzo Ruiz
- Jacobo Kyushei Tomonaga
