= John Nava =

John Nava may refer to:

- John Nava (cyclist), Venezuelan cyclist
- John Nava (painter), American artist
