= Courtet =

Courtet is a French surname. Notable people with the surname include:

- Émile Cohl (1857–1938), French caricaturist, cartoonist, and animator
- Gaëtan Courtet (born 1989), French footballer
- Guillaume Courtet (1589–1637), French Dominican priest
