= Lorenzo Ruiz =

First Filipino martyr and saint

Saint Lorenzo of Manila TOSD
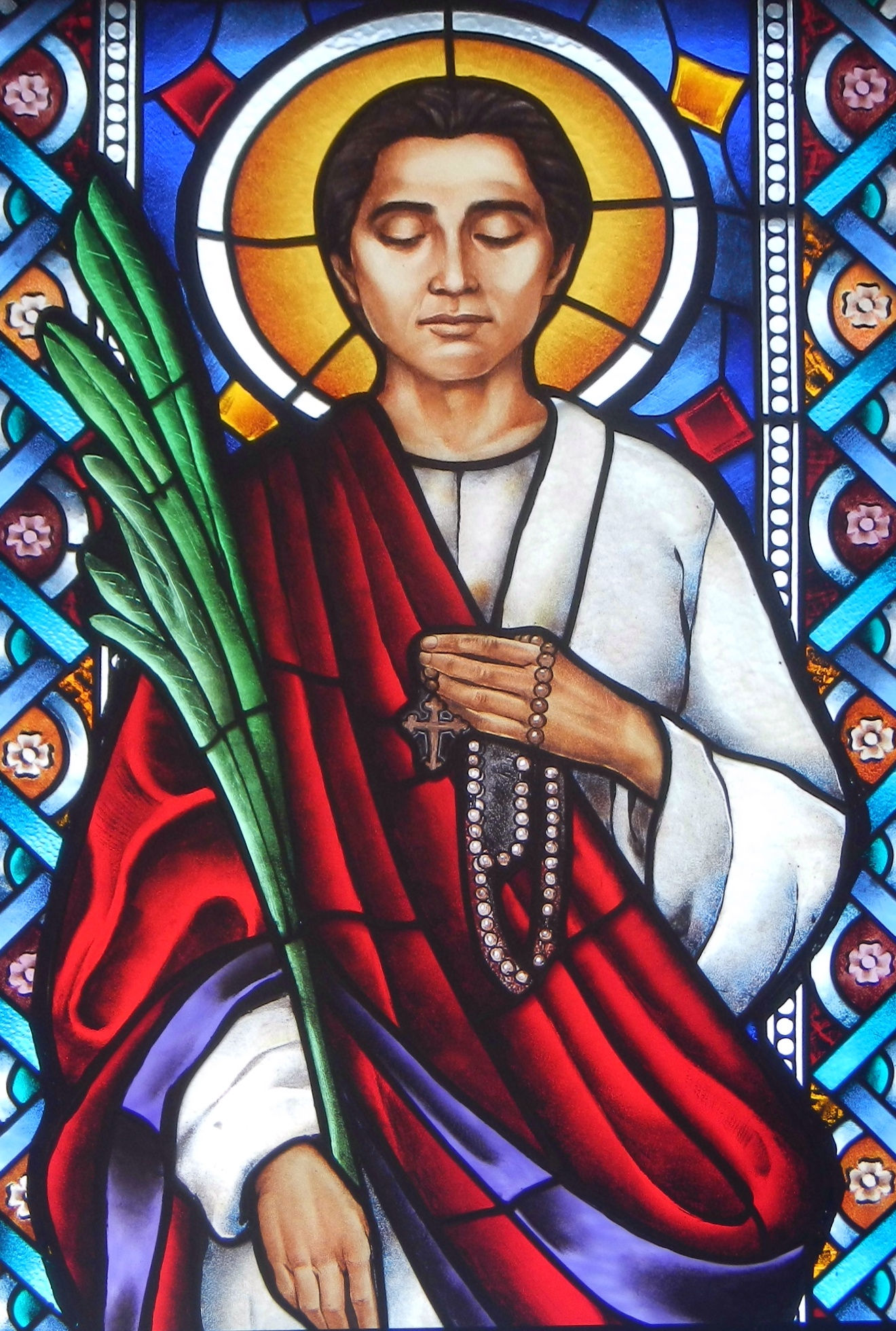
- Ruiz on a stained-glass window in Cubao Cathedral

Martyr
- Born: November 28, 1594; Binondo, Captaincy General of the Philippines, Spanish Empire
- Died: September 29, 1637 (aged 42); Nagasaki, Hizen Province, Tokugawa Shogunate
- Cause of death: Tsurushi
- Venerated in: Catholic Church
- Beatified: February 18, 1981, Rizal Park, Manila, Philippines by Pope John Paul II
- Canonized: October 18, 1987, Vatican City by Pope John Paul II
- Major shrine: Minor Basilica and National Shrine of Saint Lorenzo Ruiz, Binondo, Manila, Philippines
- Feast: 28 September
- Attributes: Rosary in clasped hands, gallows and pit, barong tagalog or camisa de chino and black trousers, cross, palm of martyrdom
- Patronage: The Philippines, Filipinos, Overseas Filipino Workers and migrant workers, immigrants, the poor, separated families, Filipino youth, Chinese-Filipinos, Filipino Altar servers, Tagalogs, Archdiocese of Manila.

Lorenzo Ruiz
- Traditional Chinese: 李樂倫
- Simplified Chinese: 李乐伦
Transcriptions
Standard Mandarin
- Hanyu Pinyin: Lǐ Yuèlún
Yue: Cantonese
- Jyutping: Lei5 Ngok6leon4
Southern Min
- Hokkien POJ: Lí Ga̍k-lûn

Lorenzo Ruiz (Filipino: Lorenzo Ruiz ng Maynila; simplified Chinese: 李乐伦; traditional Chinese: 李樂倫; Spanish: Lorenzo Ruiz de Manila; 28 November 1594 – 29 September, 1637), also called Lorenzo of Manila, was a Filipino Catholic layman and a member of the Third Order of Saint Dominic. A Chinese Filipino, he became his country's protomartyr after his execution in Japan by the Tokugawa shogunate during its persecution of Japanese Christians in the 17th century. Lorenzo Ruiz is the patron saint of, among others, the Philippines and the Filipino people.

== Early life ==
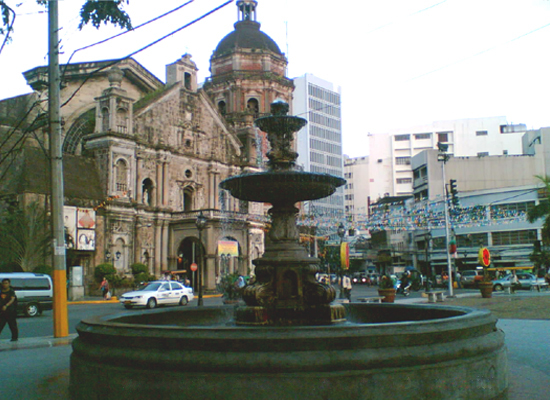
Plaza San Lorenzo Ruiz and Binondo Church, the main shrine of San Lorenzo Ruiz

Lorenzo Ruiz was a Filipino born in Binondo, Manila, on 28 November 1594, to a Chinese father and a Tagalog mother who were both Catholic. His father taught him Chinese while his mother taught him Tagalog.

Lorenzo served as an altar boy at the Binondo Church. After being educated by the Dominican friars for a few years, Lorenzo earned the title of escribano (scrivener) because of his skillful penmanship. He became a member of the Cofradía del Santísimo Rosario (Confraternity of the Rosary). He married Rosario, a native, and they had two sons and a daughter. The Ruiz family led a generally peaceful, religious and content life.

In 1636, while working as a clerk for the Binondo Church, Lorenzo was falsely accused of killing a Spaniard. Lorenzo sought asylum on board a ship with three Dominican priests: Antonio Gonzalez, Guillermo Courtet, and Miguel de Aozaraza; a Japanese priest, Vicente Shiwozuka de la Cruz, and a lay leper, Lázaro of Kyoto. Lorenzo and his companions sailed for Okinawa on 10 June 1636, with the aid of the Dominican fathers.

== Martyrdom ==
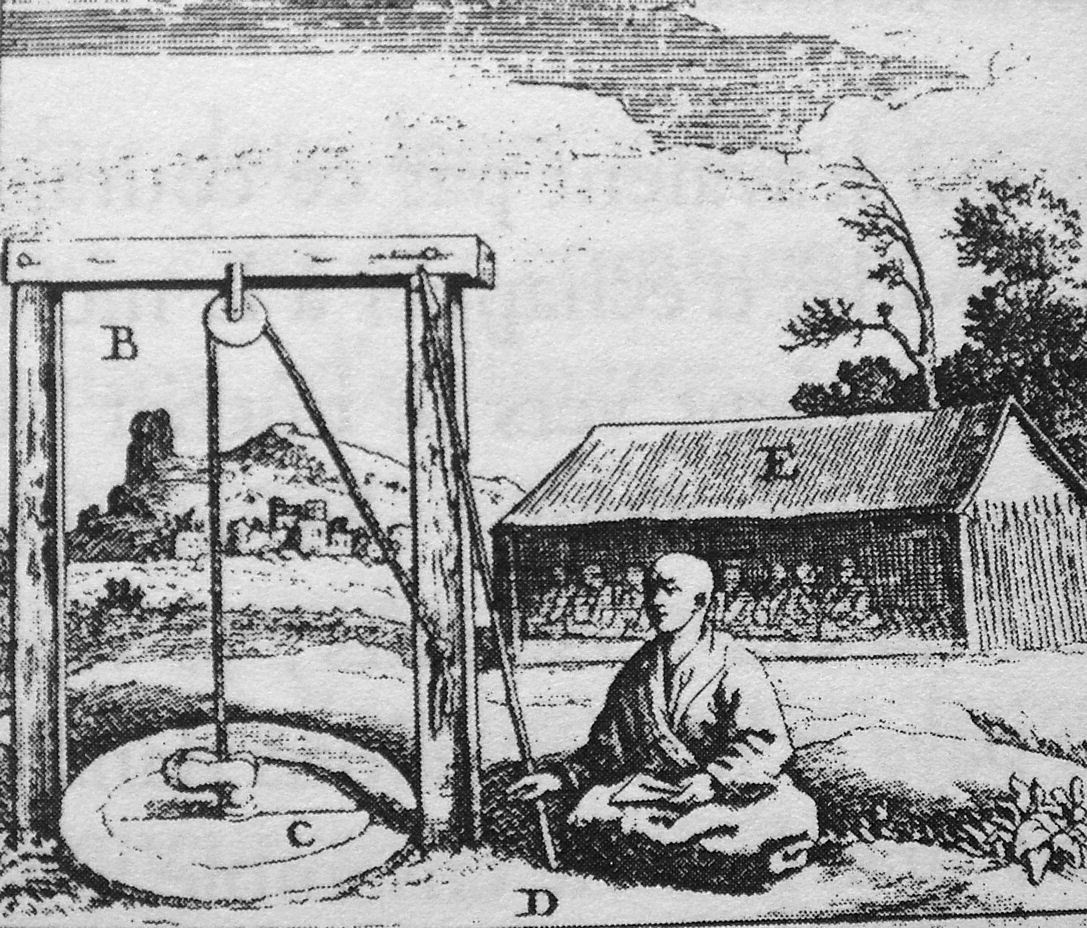
Depiction of tsurushi

The Tokugawa Shogunate was persecuting Christians because they feared that the Spanish invaded the Philippines through using religion by the time Lorenzo had arrived in Japan. The missionaries were arrested and thrown into prison, and after two years, they were transferred to Nagasaki to face trial by torture. The group endured many and various cruel methods of torture.

On 27 September 1637, Lorenzo and his companions were taken to Nishizaka Hill, where they were tortured by being hung upside-down over a pit and bled. He died two days later on 29 September 1637, aged 42. This form of torture was known as tsurushi in Japanese or horca y hoya ("gallows and pit") in Spanish. The method, alleged to have been extremely painful, had the victim bound; one hand was always left free so that the individual may signal their desire to recant, leading to their release. Despite his suffering, Lorenzo refused to renounce Christianity and died from eventual blood loss and suffocation. His last words were recorded as:

Latin: Ego Catholicus sum et animo prompto paratoque pro Deo mortem obibo. Si mille vitas haberem, cunctas ei offerrem.
("I am a Catholic and wholeheartedly do accept death for God; had I a thousand lives, all these to Him shall I offer.")

After his death, his body was cremated and the ashes thrown into the sea in Nagasaki to prevent other Christians from venerating his relics.

== Veneration ==
=== Beatification process ===
The positio for the cause of beatification of Lorenzo Ruiz was written by Spanish historian Fidel Villarroel. The central document found to exhibit Ruiz's martyrdom was an eyewitness account by two Japanese former priests of the Society of Jesus, rediscovered by Villaroel at the Jesuit Generalate archive in Rome, an unlikely location as Ruiz was a tertiary of the Dominican order. Lorenzo was beatified during Pope John Paul II's papal visit to the Philippines in 1981, in the first beatification ceremony held outside the Vatican.

=== Canonization ===
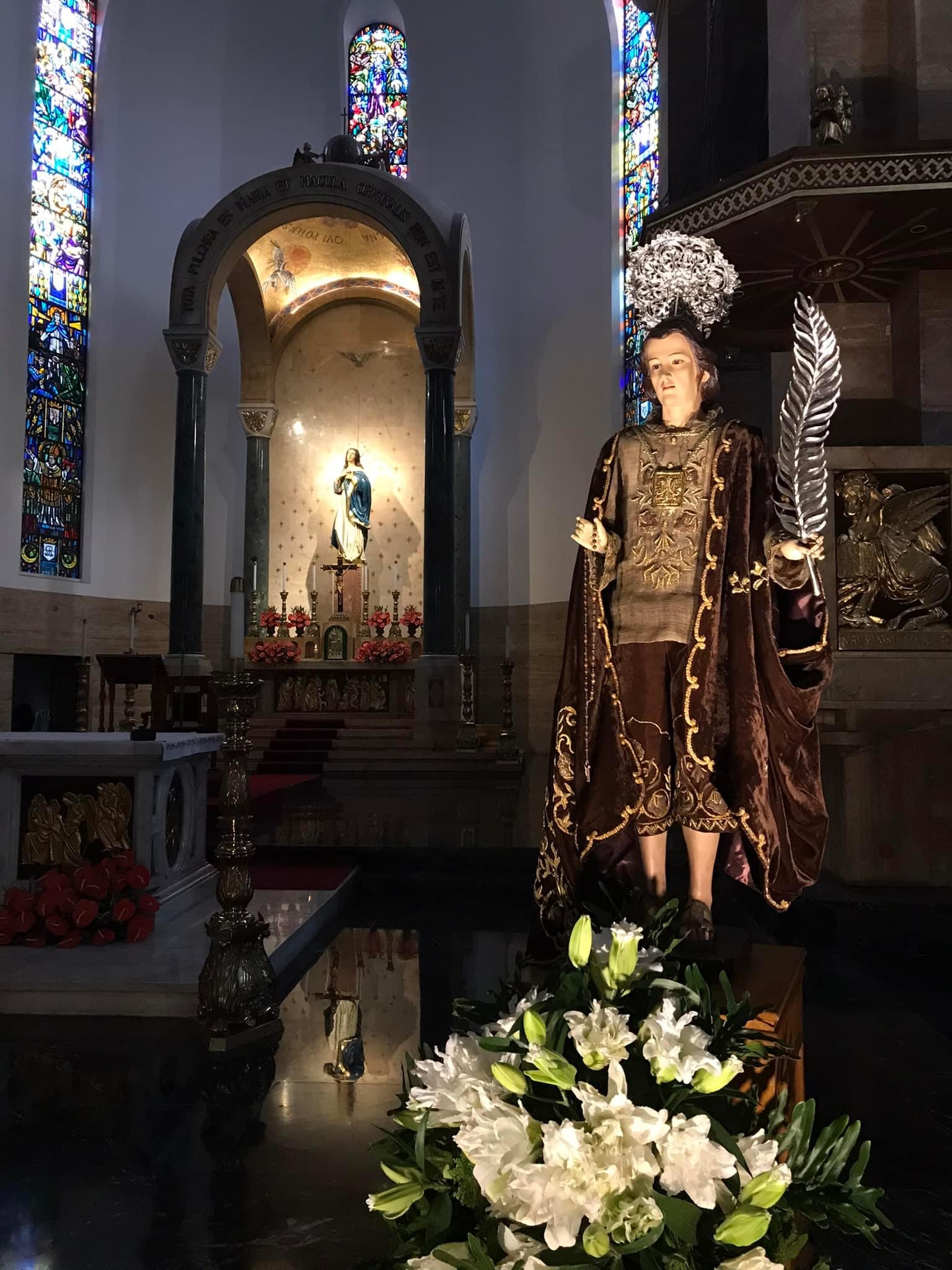
A statue of San Lorenzo Ruiz enshrined at the Manila Cathedral

Lorenzo was canonized by Pope John Paul II on October 18, 1987 among the 16 Martyrs of Japan, making him the first Filipino saint. Ruiz's canonization was supported by miracle in October 1983, when Cecilia Alegria Policarpio of Calinog, Iloilo, was cured of brain atrophy at the age of two, after her family and supporters prayed to Lorenzo for his intercession. She was diagnosed with the condition shortly after birth and was treated at University of the East Ramon Magsaysay Memorial Medical Center. On 28 September, 2017, the 30th anniversary of Ruiz's canonization was celebrated in the Archdiocese of Manila.

== Other tributes ==
Lorenzo Ruiz is included in American painter John Nava's Communion of Saints Tapestries, a depiction of 135 saints and blessed which hangs inside the Cathedral of Our Lady of the Angels in Los Angeles. Ruiz is depicted with other saints in mosaic of the Trinity Dome of Basilica of the National Shrine of the Immaculate Conception in Washington, D.C.

== In popular culture ==
=== Film and theater ===
- Ang Buhay ni Lorenzo Ruiz, a 1970 Filipino religious biographical film
- Lorenzo Ruiz... The Saint... A Filipino!, a 1988 Filipino film
- Lorenzo Ruiz, Escribano, a 1994 contemporary Filipino opera composed by Jerry Amper Dadap, commissioned by the University of Santo Tomas Conservatory of Music. Regarded as the first opera on the first Filipino saint, it was staged at the Philam Life Theater in Manila. The opera was based on the play by Ophelia Alcantara Dimalanta, with a Filipino translation by Florentino Hornedo and direction by Isagani R. Cruz.
- Lorenzo, a musical staged in September 2013, by Green Wings Entertainment, with music by Ryan Cayabyab, book and lyrics by Juan Ekis and Paul Dumol, with the collaboration of Joem Antonio, direction by Nonon Padilla, and production by Christopher de Leon.

=== Books ===
- Carunungan, Celso Al. To Die a Thousand Deaths: A Novel on the Life and Times of Lorenzo Ruiz, Social Studies Publications, Metro Manila, Philippines, 1980.
- Delgado, Antonio C. The Making of The First Filipino Saint, The Ala-Ala Foundation, 1982.
- Dela Peña, Rev. Ordanico "The Birth of the Catholic Philippines in Asia: Includes the Lives of San Lorenzo Ruiz and Blessed Pedro Calungsod", Xlibris Corp., 2000
- Diaz, Em. On The Road With San Lorenzo, UST Publishing, Inc., 2005
- Tan, Susan. The Martyrdom of Saint Lorenzo Ruiz, Pauline Publishing & Media, 2007
- Tan, Susan. Martyred: The Story of Saint Lorenzo Ruiz, Pauline Publishing & Media, 2014
- Villarroel, Fidel. Lorenzo de Manila: The Protomartyr of the Philippines and His Companions, UST Publishing, Inc., 1988

=== Television ===
- Canonization of Blessed Lorenzo Ruiz TV Special Coverage (PTV 4, 1987)
- Saint Lorenzo Ruiz: The Life, A 1st Filipino Saint Documentary Special (PTV 4, 1987)

=== Educational institutions ===
- Escuela de San Lorenzo Ruiz Academy, Greenheights Subdivision, Brgy. San Antonio, Sucat, Parañaque
- Lorenzo Ruiz Academy, 1606 Ongpin Street, Binondo, Manila
- Lorenzo Ruiz de Manila School, Felix Ave., Vista Verde Executive Village Phase 1, Cainta, Rizal
- San Lorenzo Ruiz Center of Studies and Schools, Villa de San Lorenzo, St. Dominic Corinthian, Dolores, San Fernando, Pampanga
- San Lorenzo Ruiz De Manila School, Buenmar Ave., Greenland Phase 1, Nangka, Marikina
- San Lorenzo Ruiz Academy, Valencia Site, Poblacion, Polomolok, South Cotabato
- St. Lorenzo Ruiz Academy of Tagum, Inc., Apokon Road, Tagum, Davao del Norte

== See also ==
- List of Filipinos venerated in the Catholic Church
- Ignacia del Espíritu Santo
- Jerónima de la Asunción
- Kakure Kirishitan
- Martha de San Bernardo, the first Filipino nun
- Martyrs of Japan
- Pedro Calungsod, the second Filipino saint
