= Thomasian Martyrs =

Dominican Catholic priests, Martyrs, Blesseds and Saints

Saints and Blesseds 17 Thomasian Martyrs
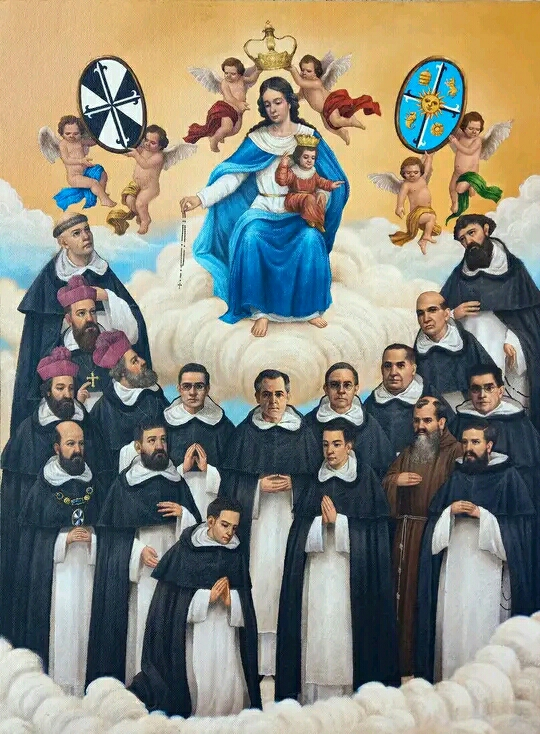
- 17 Thomasian Martyrs, circa 2023.

Priests, Bishops, Religious, Missionaries and Martyrs
- Born: Various; 13 from Spain; 1 from Japan; 1 from France; 1 from Vietnam; 1 from the Philippines
- Died: (Dominican Martyrs of Japan) c. 1633- 1637; Nagasaki, Tokugawa Shogunate (Dominican Martyrs of Vietnam) c. 1773- 1861; Vietnam (Dominican and Franciscan Martyrs of the Spanish Civil War) c. 1934- 1936; Madrid, Second Spanish Republic
- Cause of death: (Dominican Martyrs of Japan); Tsurushi (Dominican Martyrs of Vietnam); Torture and Decapitation (Dominican and Franciscan Martyrs of the Spanish Civil War); Execution
- Venerated in: Catholic Church
- Beatified: (Dominican Martyrs of Japan); February 18, 1981; Luneta Park, Manila, Philippines by Pope John Paul II (Dominican Martyrs of Vietnam); May 20, 1906; Saint Peter's Basilica, Vatican City by Pope Pius X April 29, 1951; Saint Peter's Square, Vatican City by Pope Pius XII (Dominican and Franciscan Martyrs of the Spanish Civil War); October 28, 2007; Saint Peter's Square, Vatican City by Pope Benedict XVI; October 13, 2013; Tarragona Educational Complex, Tarragona, Spain by Cardinal Angelo Amato (on behalf of Pope Francis)
- Canonized: (Dominican Martyrs of Japan); October 18, 1987; Saint Peter's Square, Vatican City by Pope John Paul II (Dominican Martyrs of Vietnam); June 19, 1988; Saint Peter's Square, Vatican City by Pope John Paul II
- Major shrine: Santísimo Rosario Church, Ceferino Gonzales Drive, 1008, Sampaloc, Manila, Philippines
- Feast: November 6
- Attributes: Dominican habit Franciscan habit Crown of martyrdom Martyr's palm Rosary
- Patronage: University of Santo Tomas; Persecuted Christians

The 17 Thomasian Martyrs were 17 Christian men (Dominicans and Franciscans) who were staff and students at the University of Santo Tomas in Manila, and who were martyred in Japan, Vietnam and Spain between 1633 and 1936. All of them gave up their lives for their Christian faith.

They are venerated in the Catholic Church and regarded as a martyrs. They were declared as a saints and blesseds by several popes throughout the 20th and 21st century.

Their feast day is celebrated every year on November 6.

Lorenzo Ruiz de Manila was among the lay companions of the Thomasian Martyrs of Japan.

== The Martyrs of Japan ==
Conversion of some Japanese to the Christian faith took place between the years 1549–1640 in Japan through the efforts of missionary evangelizers. During this era, the country was ruled by the bakufu, a military government headed by the shōguns who governed the country in the name of the Emperor. The Emperor at this time had become a mere figurehead, secluded in his palace in Kyoto.

Factors in the outbreak of severe repression of Christianity in Japan included the fear of the Shoguns of all foreign influence. Contributory were the quarrels between Christian denominations, and imprudent acts of foreign navigators.

=== Antonio González ===
Born in León, Spain, Antonio Gonzalez entered the Dominican Order at the age of 16. His favorite saint was Peter of Verona, the protomartyr of the Dominican order, thus his religious enthusiasm gave rise to his living desire for martyrdom. After completing his studies, he was ordained and sent to Piedrahita as a theology professor. When an invitation was sent to their convent asking for volunteer missionaries for the Far East, González was among those who eagerly volunteered. His target destination was Japan, but he had to prepare for this mission in the Philippines. He arrived in Manila in May 1632. He became professor and acting rector of the University of Santo Tomas.

In 1636, González was finally able to fulfill his dream of going to Japan. After a year of missionary activity, he was arrested, proudly wearing his habit to signify that he went to Japan for the sake of the Gospel. After suffering tremendous torture, he died on September 24, 1637. González was canonized by Pope John Paul II on October 18, 1987, together with his companion martyrs.

=== Domingo Ibáñez de Erquicia ===
Born in February, 1589 in Regil, Guipuzcoa, Spain, Domingo Ibáñez de Erquicia entered the Dominican Priory of San Thelmo at the age of 16. Realizing the need for missionaries in the Far East, he joined the Dominicans who went to the Philippines and arrived in Manila in the year 1611 and became professor of Theology at the University of Santo Tomás. Ten years later, he was sent to Japan. Constantly faced with danger, he spent his decade of mission in Japan faithfully preaching the Gospel and administering the sacraments, until he was finally caught by the Japanese authorities and killed through the "gallows and hole" torture, by which "the persons were hung upside down from gallows with the upper half of the body hanging into a fetid hole." After thirty hours of continuous torture, he finally expired on August 14, 1633.

=== Lucas del Espiritu Santos ===
Born in Zamora, Spain on October 18, 1594, he entered the Dominican Order at the age of 16. In the year 1617, he answered the missionary calling to evangelize in the Far East. He became Lecturer of Arts at the University of Santo Tomás. He was sent to Japan and arrived there in June 1623. For ten years, he engaged in underground apostolate. On September 8, 1633, he was arrested in Osaka, and a month later, on October 18, he was subjected to the "gallows and hole" torture. He died on the following day.

He was beatified on November 18, 1981, and canonized by Pope John Paul II on October 18, 1987.

=== Tomás Hioji de San Jacinto ===
Born of Christian Japanese parents in 1590, in Kyūshū, Japan, he witnessed how his parents were martyred for their Christian faith. He went to the Philippines and sought admission to the Dominican Order. He studied philosophy at the University of Santo Tomás. He went back to Japan on November 10, 1629. Being Japanese, Thomas was able to move about with some freedom. While doing his missionary endeavors, he chronicled the martyrdom of his fellow Dominicans. The Japanese authorities eventually arrested him. He was subjected to the "gallows and hole" torture. He died on November 15, 1634.

=== Guillaume Courtet ===
Guillaume Courtet was a French Dominican of noble origins born in 1590. He joined the Order at the age of 17. He became prior of the Community in Avignon, France. His childhood dream to be a missionary was fulfilled when he set sail for the Philippines in 1634. He became professor of theology at the University of Santo Tomás. Because of his holiness and zeal for the Gospel, in 1636 he was sent to be a missionary in Japan. A year later, he was arrested. In his trial, he affirmed that only Christian truth will save mankind. For this, he was condemned to death. and put through the "gallows and hole" torture. He died on 29 September 1637.

== The Martyrs of Vietnam ==
Vietnam was first introduced to Christianity in the year 1627. The Dominicans set foot on the country in 1676. Among the milestones of the Dominican missions were the training of catechists and the establishment of charitable institutions. The predominant religions during the era of martyrs were Taoism and Buddhism.

The government of Vietnam was similar to China. It was an empire ruled by dynasties that succeeded each other. The Emperor was regarded as an absolute monarch. In 1711, Emperor An Vuong issued the first Edict of Persecution of Christians.

=== Domingo Henares ===
The 30-year-old Córdoba-born Domingo Henares de Zafra Cubero arrived in Manila on July 9, 1796. He completed his studies in the University of Santo Tomás and there became a professor of Humanities. He went to Vietnam in 1790 where eventually he became bishop. His knowledge of medicine, astronomy, and the sciences was greatly appreciated by the Vietnamese, even respected by the Mandarins. Still, the fact that he was Christian made him subject to persecution. On June 9, 1838, he was arrested and a month later, on June 25, 1838, he was beheaded.

=== Vicente Liem de la Paz ===
Vicente Liem de la Paz was a native Vietnamese born in 1731. This brilliant student was sent to the Philippines to study at the Colegio de San Juan de Letran. In 1753, he entered the Dominican order and studied in the University of Santo Tomás where he was later ordained a priest. After his petition to serve his people was approved, he went back to Vietnam as a missionary, working under Jacinto Castañeda, until he was arrested, tortured, and beheaded on November 7, 1773. He was the first Vietnamese Christian martyr.

=== Jose María Díaz Sanjurjo ===
José María Díaz Sanjurjo was born in Lugo, Spain on August 25, 1818. He secretly entered the Dominican Priory in Ocaña, and in 1842, he received the Dominican habit. He was a famous Latin scholar, theologian, and legal expert. He arrived in Manila on September 14, 1844. He completed his studies while teaching at the University of Santo Tomás. After a year, he left for the Vietnamese missions. In March 1849, he became bishop. Even as he was raised to the episcopal rank, he remained a lowly servant of the Gospel. According to him, "Here, the dignities mean more work. I don't have any means of transportation at all, and although I did not vow to go barefoot, I do and sometimes with mud up to my knees" In 1856, he was arrested and was beheaded a year later.

=== Pedro Almato ===
Pedro Almato was born in Barcelona, Catalonia, Spain on All Saints' Day, 1830. He went to Manila, studied in the University of Santo Tomás, and was ordained in 1853. Learning of the persecutions in Vietnam, he obtained permission from his superiors to go on mission in the said country. In October 1861, after several years of missionary work, Almato was captured and was beheaded on his birthday.

=== Jeronimo Hermosilla ===
Born in the year 1800 to a poor family in Santo Domingo de la Calzada in Spain, Jeronimo Hermosilla entered the Diocesan Seminary of Valencia when he was fifteen years of age, but later sought admission to the Order of Preachers after being captivated by his Dominican professors. In 1824, he went to Manila and completed his theological studies at the University of Santo Tomas. He was ordained priest in 1828. A year later he was sent as a missionary to Tonkin. There he learned the native language and taught catechism in collaboration with local catechists and other missionary Dominicans. In 1841 he was appointed bishop, and despite the persecution, continued his ministry hiding in safe places, until he was finally captured. He died on 1 November 1861.

== The Martyrs of the Religious Persecution in Spain ==
On October 28, 2007, Pope Benedict XVI beatified 498 martyrs of the Spanish Civil War. This ceremony was carried out in a Holy Mass presided over by Cardinal José Saraiva Martins, prefect of the Congregation for the Causes of Saints. This was the largest mass beatification ever in the history of the Catholic Church.

=== Religious persecution in Spain during the Spanish Civil War ===
After the fall of the monarchy, the Second Spanish Republic was established. The Republican government and its supporters, a combined force of communists, socialists and anarchists, was particularly antagonistic towards the nobility, the land owners, and the Catholic Church. In 1936, a coup d'etat staged by rebel forces (Nacionalistas) attempted to overthrow the communist republicans, leading to a three-year political unrest characterized by extreme brutality and violence resulting to countless deaths among the government and rebel forces, as well as ordinary citizens caught in the war.

Since the Catholic Church has been among those considered as enemies of the republicans, thousands of priests and religious perished in organized persecutions. Though the civil war began in 1936, communist forces had started torturing and executing priests and religious as early as 1933.

Seventy-four Dominicans, most of them friars, were among those beatified on 28 October 2007. Of these, eight stayed for some time in the Philippines, six of them, Thomasians.

=== Buenaventura García Paredes ===
Buenaventura Paredes was the 78th successor of Dominic as Master of the Order of Preachers. Born to a pious family in Castañedo de Valdes, Luarca, Spain on April 19, 1866, Paredes eventually decided to enter the Order of Preachers and received the Dominican habit on August 30, 1833. True to the Dominican tradition of scholarship, he studied theology, civil law, and philosophy and letters prior to his ordination to the priesthood on July 25, 1891. After his ordination, he pursued further studies with which he earned his doctorate in philosophy and letters and in jurisprudence. He then traveled to the Philippines as a missionary assigned to the Dominican Province of Our Lady of the Most Holy Rosary. While in Manila, he obtained the degree of lector in theology, which was a requirement for teaching in the University of Santo Tomas. Paredes was a professor of political and administrative law at the UST Faculty of Civil Law which was then in Intramuros. He was also director of the UST and published the Catholic newspaper "Libertas".

In 1901, he returned to Spain where he assumed several positions of responsibility. He came back to Manila when in 1910, he was elected as the Prior Provincial of the Holy Rosary Province, a position he held for seven years. During his term as Provincial, he became among those responsible for the procurement of a land in Sulucan Hills on which the present UST Campus now stands. After his term ended, he went back to Spain to serve as the superior of a Dominican convent in Madrid. In 1926, despite his plea to be relieved of such great responsibility, Paredes was elected by the General Chapter as Master General of the Order. Due to some serious problems in the Order which weakened his health, Paredes resigned his office in 1929. He then retired to the convent in Ocaña.

When the civil war broke out in July 1936, Paredes was in Madrid. A month earlier, realizing that war was imminent, he expressed his desire to travel back to the Philippines. However, even after he was permitted by his superiors in Rome, Paredes could not leave Spain because the government would not issue him a passport. Providentially, Paredes had left his Madrid convent the night before it was attacked by armed men on July 19, 1936. After this event, Paredes, along with other Dominicans, had to be sheltered by a benefactor, Don Pedro Errazquin, himself murdered after a chalice belonging to Paredes was found in his house. Being constantly under police surveillance, Paredes had to stay in a boarding house, where he continued to perform his priestly duties: hearing confessions, praying the office, and celebrating the Eucharist. On August 11, he was arrested by armed men, and bravely he declared himself a priest and a religious. He was taken to a place of torture, and in the morning of the following day, he was shot in Valdesenderín del Encinar. His rosary and his breviary were found near his cadaver.

In his honor, the Buenaventura Garcia Paredes, O.P. Building, which houses the Thomasian Alumni Center, as well as P. Paredes Street, a street close to UST were named after him.

=== Jesus Villaverde Andrés ===
Jesus Villaverde Andres was born in San Miguel de Dueñas, León, Spain, on December 4, 1877. In 1894, he entered the Dominican Order and after completing his theological studies, he was ordained to the priesthood on June 26, 1903. He was then sent to the Philippines, and around the years 1905-1910, he taught at the Colegio de San Juan de Letran. He returned to Spain and was assigned to the Convent of Valencia. In 1916, he went back to the Philippines to teach in the University of Santo Tomas where he held a professorial chair in theology after obtaining his Doctorate in Sacred Theology from the UST Faculty of Sacred Theology in 1919. He became professor of dogmatic theology and canon law in the same faculty. He held several positions of responsibility in UST. He was secretary general from 1919 to 1921 and treasurer from 1929 to 1932. During the years 1921-1924, Villaverde was in the United States, serving as prior of the Dominican Community in Rosaryville, New Orleans. When he returned to Manila, he became the rector of the Colegio de San Juan de Letrán from 1924 to 1927. He then became dean of the UST Faculty of Sacred Theology from 1932 to 1934. Among the new Thomasian blesseds, it was only Jesús Villaverde Andrés who was able to see UST in its present location, having resided at the present Priory of St. Thomas Aquinas. Villaverde occupied one of the rooms in the UST Fathers' Residence.

Villaverde went back to Spain to serve as prior of the Santo Tomás Convent in Avila and later on was assigned to Madrid. While in Madrid, his convent was attacked by the communists in July 1936. Villaverde had to hide in his mother's house in Cuesta de los Descargos. Later on, his brother, Carlos, a military man, took custody of him for three months. In his brother's house he did nothing but pray and console his family. On October 15 1939, he was arrested by the milicianos. Carlos' children tried to save Villaverde by telling the arresting officers that there was no priest in their house, but when the milicianos threatened to take Carlos instead, Villaverde voluntarily showed up and handled himself over to the arresting officers. He was brought to the place of torture and executed the next day; the manner of which still remains a mystery.

Throughout his life as a Dominican, Villaverde faithfully carried out all his duties as a priest and a religious. Often criticized for his being strict and somewhat temperamental, unknown to many, Villaverde was quietly suffering the pains brought on him by his liver disease. Witnesses of his priestly life affirm that he was an excellent preacher, and his brilliance as a theologian earned him the respect of the Holy See.

=== Pedro Ibáñez Alonzo, Manuel Moreno Martines, Maximino Fendandez Mariñas and José María López Carillo ===
These four martyrs of the Religious Persecution in Spain sailed to the Philippines as young Dominican missionaries assigned to the Holy Rosary Province. They stayed for sometime in the convent of Santo Domingo in Intramuros. During their time there, they took up theological studies in the University of Santo Tomás. They were ordained as priests in Santo Domingo Church, and after several assignments both in and out of the Philippines, they went back to Spain and were assigned to the Holy Rosary Convent in Madrid. After their convent was attacked by the Republicans, they went into hiding until they were found and arrested by the milicianos who tortured and eventually executed them. Alonzo was a missionary in China before going back to Spain. He and Carillo tried to escape the persecution but the milicianos caught and executed them. Martines, who studied moral theology in UST, was executed after being caught by milicianos in a train station. Eleven gunshot wounds were found on the body of Mariñas.

=== Jose Maria de Manila ===
Born on September 5, 1880, in the old city of Manila, Eugenio Saz-Orozco took the name Jose Maria when he entered the Order of the Friars Minor Capuchin in Spain. His father was the last mayor of Manila during the last years of the Spanish government that ended in 1898.

He finished his secondary schooling in 1895 at the University of Santo Tomas while remaining “alumno interno” at San Juan de Letran. It was his school records in UST that identified him as “de Manila” thus indicating he was born in the City. He went to Spain in 1896 for the purpose of making the necessary higher studies in preparation for a career. It was in Spain that he decided to join the Capuchin Order. He and was ordained to the priesthood on November 30, 1910.

He had longed to go back as a missionary to the Philippines. However, he was arrested in Madrid and on August 17, 1936, he was executed. His last words before he died were: “Long live Christ the King!”

The University of Santo Tomas holds an annual commemoration in honor of the martyrs.
