= Marina of Omura =

Japanese martyr

Saint Marina of Omura
- Died: 11 November 1634; Nagasaki, Kyushu, Japan
- Cause of death: burned at the stake
- Canonized: 18 October 1987 by Pope John Paul II
- Major shrine: Nakamachi Church
- Feast: 28 September

Marina of Omura (Japanese: 大村のマリナ, romanized: Ōmura no Marina; died 11 November 1634) was a Japanese Dominican tertiary who sheltered Roman Catholic missionaries. She is one of the 16 Martyrs of Japan.

== Biography ==
Marina of Omura was a Japanese woman who entered the Dominican Third Order in 1626. She took vows of poverty, chastity and obedience and sheltered Catholic missionaries who were in hiding due to an order banishing them from Japan.

In 1634, when Marina of Omura was found to be a Christian who had assisted missionaries, she was arrested, fettered in chains, humiliated and executed by being burned at the stake in Nagasaki, Kyushu, Japan.

Marina of Omura was canonised by Pope John Paul II as one of the 16 Martyrs of Japan on 18 October 1987, making her one of the first Japanese female saints. She is venerated as the advocate of fortitude. Her feast day is 28 September.

In 2015, statues of Marina of Omura and the other 16 martyrs were built in the Japanese garden to the side of Nakamachi Church.
