= John Alcober =

Spanish Dominican, missionary, martyr, Catholic saint (1694–1748)

Saint John Alcober O.P.
- Born: December 31, 1694; Granada, Spain
- Died: October 28, 1748; Fuzhou, China
- Cause of death: strangulation
- Beatified: May 14, 1893 by Pope Leo XIII
- Canonized: October 1, 2000 by Pope John Paul II

John Alcober (Spanish: Juan Alcober Figuera, Chinese name: 费若望; 1694 – October 28, 1748) was a Spanish Dominican friar and missionary in China during the 18th century. He died in 1748 and was ultimately canonized.

== Life ==
Alcober was born in Granada, Spain on December 31, 1694. His father and mother were Francis Alcober and Vincenta Figueras.

He joined the Dominican Order in Spain and entered the Royal Priory of the Holy Cross in Granada in 1708. He was ordained in 1718 and served as a priest in Lorca. In 1725, he left Spain and travelled to the Philippines as a missionary. He initially served the Dominican church in Binondo and later went to a parish that served Chinese Catholics. At this church he learned Chinese language and Chinese culture.

In 1728, he went to China with Francis Serrano and served as a missionary first in Guangzhou and later in Fu'an. Like other missionaries in China during this time he had to evade the authorities, since his missionary work was illegal. He was eventually captured.

In 1747, he wrote a letter to the Dominican Provincial detailing his persecutions:

On 26 June 1746, between eleven and twelve o’clock at night, about 100 soldiers attacked my house. They took me and tied a whip of leather very tightly around my neck. Then they dragged me to the river near the town of Moyang. The Mandarin of the city was there and ordered them to untie me. From there, they took me to the house where the Venerable Martyr Peter Sanz used to live. At sunrise, they transferred me to the city of Fogan. ... On the 27, they brought me to the tribunal where they asked me innumerable questions. In this manner, I spent several days suffering what you cannot imagine. The Christians were frightened and many of them fled to the mountains or hid wherever they could.

His captors branded the characters "囚犯" ("Criminal") on his face. He and several other Dominicans were executed on October 28, 1748 in Fuzhou. He was killed by strangulation.

== Canonization ==
He was beatified on May 14, 1893, by Pope Leo XIII and canonized along with other martyrs of China on October 1, 2000, by Pope John Paul II
