= Jacobo Kyushei Tomonaga =

Japanese Dominican priest

Saint Jacobo Kyushei Gorobioye Tomonaga de Santa María O.P.
- Born: c. 1582; Kuidetsu, Ōmura Domain, Hizen Province (modern Ōmura, Nagasaki), Japan
- Died: 17 August 1633; Nagasaki, Hizen Province, Japan
- Venerated in: Roman Catholic Church
- Beatified: 18 February 1981, Rizal Park, Manila, Philippines by Pope John Paul II
- Canonized: 18 October 1987, St. Peter's Basilica, Vatican City by Pope John Paul II
- Major shrine: Minor Basilica of the National Shrine of Saint Lorenzo Ruiz, Binondo, Manila, Philippines
- Feast: 17 August

Jacobo Kyushei Gorobioye Tomonaga de Santa María, OP (Japanese: ヤコボ・デ・サンタ・マリア朝長五郎兵衛, Yakobo de Santa Maria Tomonaga Gorōbyōe; c. 1582 – August 17, 1633) was a Japanese Dominican friar and Catholic priest. He worked on the 1630 Spanish edition of the Nippo Jisho, one of the first modern Japanese dictionaries. He was martyred in 1633.

== Life ==
Jacobo Kyushei Gorobioye Tomonaga was born of a noble Christian family in Kuidetsu (part of modern Ōmura, Nagasaki), Japan. In his youth, he studied with the Jesuits and became a catechist. After 1614, he came to Manila and became a Franciscan tertiary. He then sought admission to the Dominican Order and was accepted. He was ordained a priest in 1626 and sent to the island of Formosa (Taiwan). He returned to Manila in 1630.

He returned to Japan in 1632 as a missionary. He served to spread Catholicism during the period of Christians persecution.

After returning to Japan he spent very difficult years of hunger, his life was at risk and he was continually in hiding. In July 1633 his hiding place was uncovered by the authorities with the help of the traitor Miguel Kurobioye, who was his own catechist, he was caught and put into prison. There he was tortured by gallows and thrown into a pit on 15 August 1633. In two days he was dead. His body was not buried but burnt and thrown into the sea.

Jacobo Kyushei Tomonaga was declared Venerable on 11 October 1980 by Pope John Paul II (decree of martyrdom), who later beatified him on 18 February 1981 in Manila, Philippines and canonized him on 18 October 1987 in St. Peter's Basilica, Vatican City.

== Sources ==
- Lorenzo de Manila, The Proto-Martyr of The Philippines and his Companions - Fr. Fidel Villaroel, O.P., 1988
