= John Nava (painter) =

American painter and tapestry designer (born 1947)

John Nava (born 1947) is an American painter and tapestry designer. His most famous work is "The Communion of Saints", a series of tapestry panels in the interior of the Cathedral of Our Lady of the Angels in Los Angeles.

== Career ==
Nava studied at the University of California, Santa Barbara, and went on to graduate study at the Villa Schifanoia Graduate School of Fine Art in Florence, Italy.
