= Ana-tsurushi =

Japanese torture technique used in the 17th century

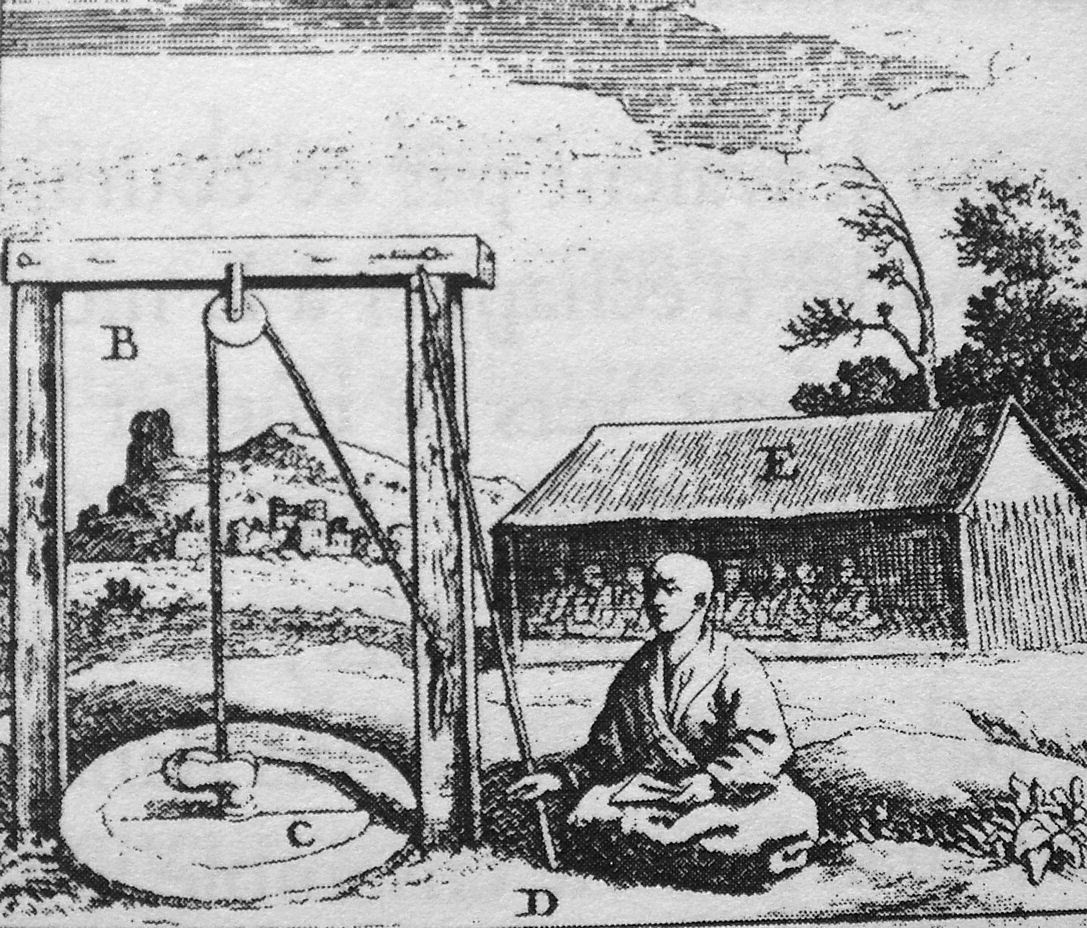
Illustration of ana-tsurushi.

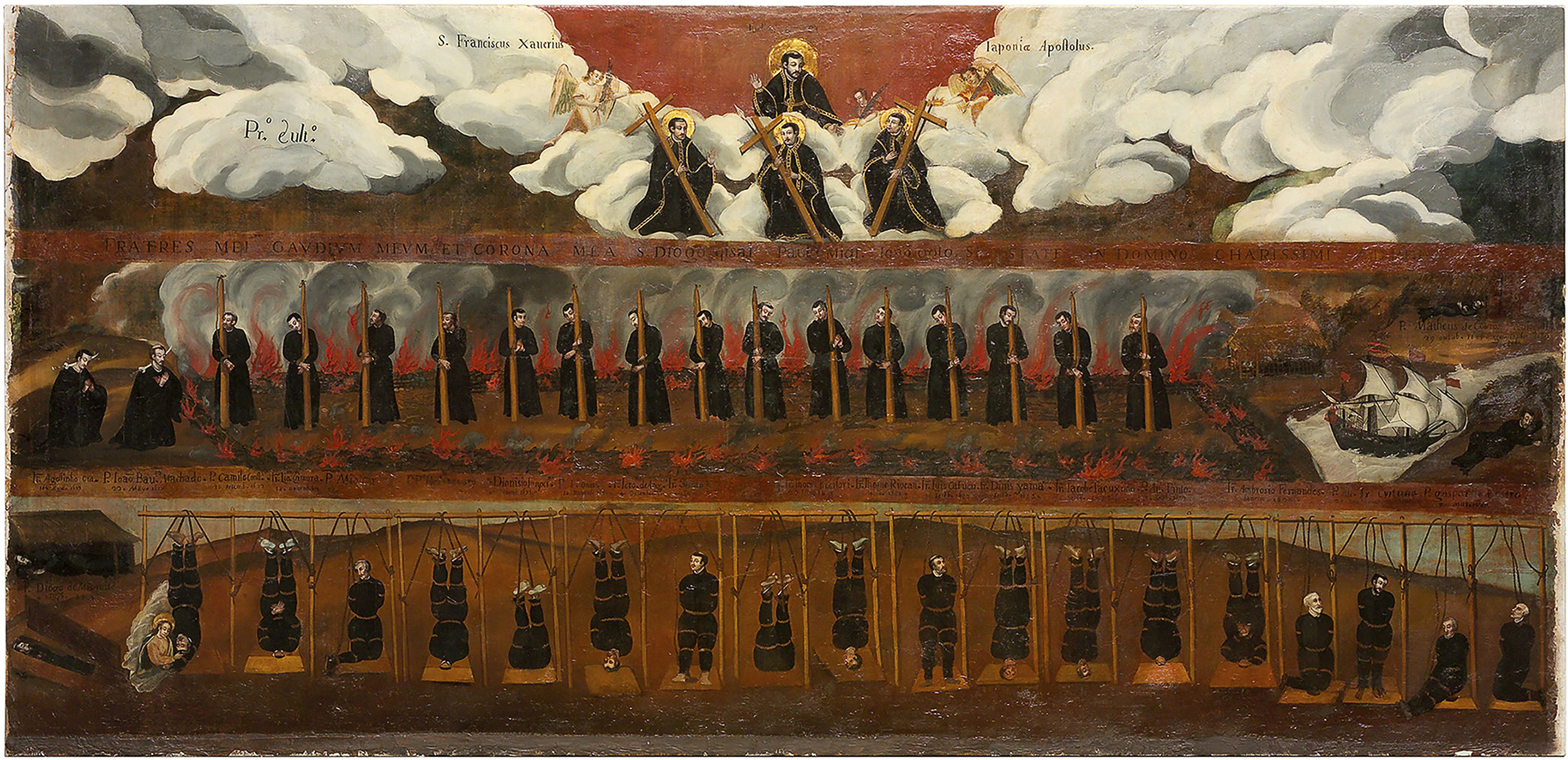
Martyrdom of Paul Miki and Companions in Nagasaki with hole hanging

Ana-tsurushi (穴吊るし; lit. "hole hanging"), also known simply as tsurushi (吊るし; lit. "hanging"), was a Japanese torture technique used in the 17th century to coerce Christians ("Kirishitan") to recant their faith. The victim was hung head-down by the feet. Both Japanese and Western Christians are known to have been subjected to the torture. One of the victim's hands would be held tight with a rope, but the other would be left free so the victim could signal his willingness to recant.

The technique was said to be unbearable for those submitted to it, though some particularly resilient martyrs never broke under torture. The body was often lowered into a hole, itself often filled with excrement at the bottom. Typically, a cut would be made in the forehead around their temples in order to let blood pressure decrease in the area around the head. The aim was to "break their resolve" to renounce their faith or they would eventually die. Sometimes, there was a doctor to resuscitate them only to be tortured again. An estimated 2,000 Christians died as martyrs. Christians were let go after apostatizing, and in this way the Tokugawa Shogunate practically purged Christianity from Japan.

Notable victims of this method of torture were Saint Lorenzo Ruiz, canonised by the Catholic Church as the protomartyr among Filipinos, and Saint Magdalene of Nagasaki, the Recollect tertiary noted for enduring the pit for 13 days before dying.

Ana-tsurushi was made famous in the novel Silence by Shusaku Endo, where it is referred to as "anazuri".

== Bibliography ==
- Boxer, C.R. The Christian Century in Japan, 1549–1650. Berkeley, Calif.: University of California Press, 1951. ISBN 1-85754-035-2 (1993 reprint edition).
- Cieslik, Hubert. “The Case of Christovão Ferreira.” Monumenta Nipponica 29, no. 1 (1974): 1–54.
