= Binondo Church =

Roman Catholic church in Manila, Philippines

- Minor Basilica and National Shrine of San Lorenzo Ruiz
- Our Lady of the Most Holy Rosary Parish
- Basilika Menor at Pambansang Dambana ni San Lorenzo Ruiz (Filipino); 聖洛倫索魯伊斯小大教堂和國家聖殿以及聖母玫瑰教區 (Chinese)
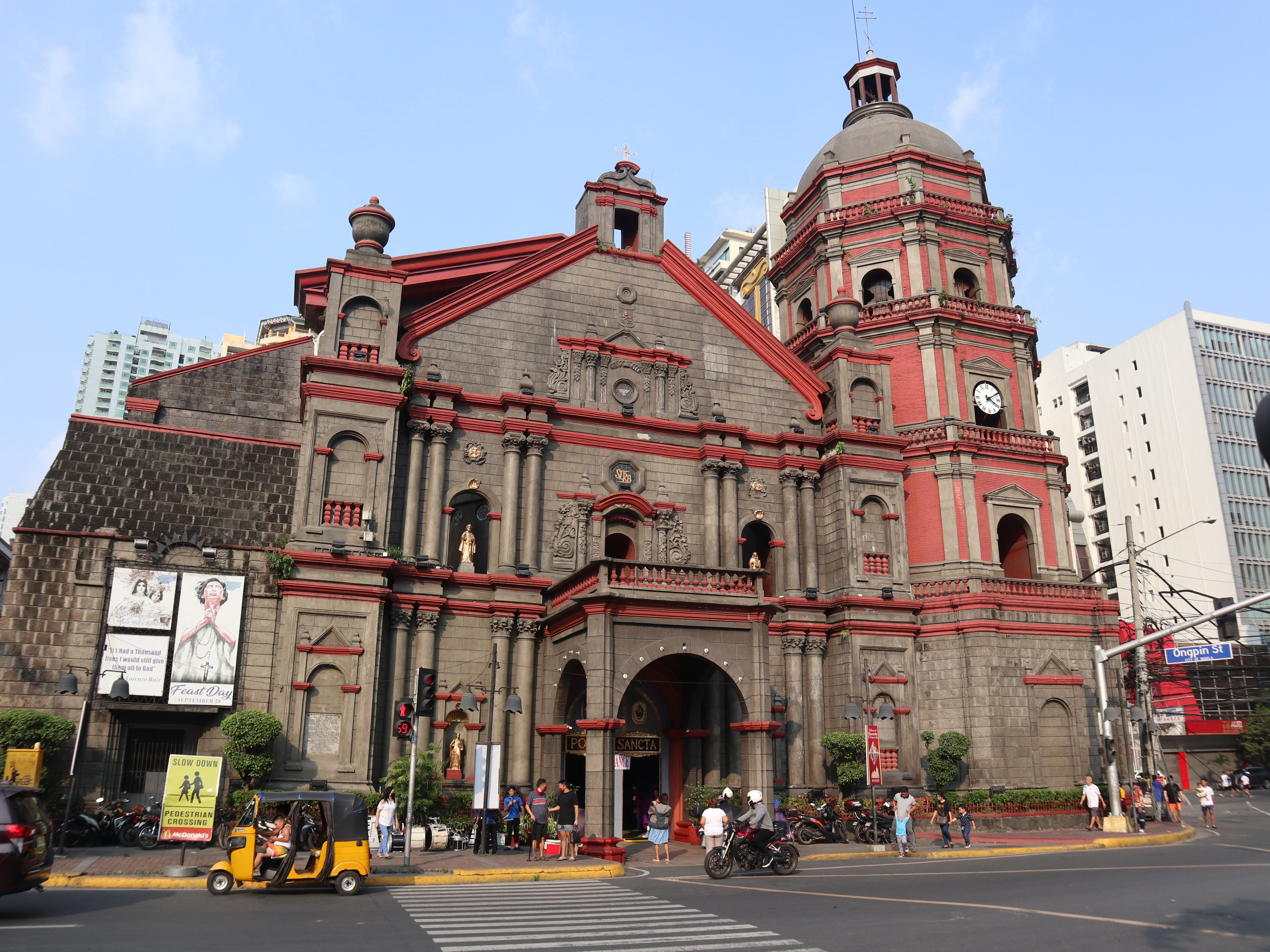
- Basilica facade in April 2023
- Binondo Church
- 14°36′01″N 120°58′29″E
- Location: Binondo, Manila
- Country: Philippines
- Language(s): Filipino, Mandarin, Hokkien, and English
- Denomination: Roman Catholic
- Religious order: Dominican Order
- Website: Binondo Church

History
- Status: Minor Basilica; National shrine
- Founded: 1596; 430 years ago
- Dedication: Saint Lorenzo Ruiz
- Other dedication: Our Lady of the Most Holy Rosary

Architecture
- Functional status: Active
- Architectural type: Church building
- Style: Baroque
- Completed: 1852; 174 years ago

Specifications
- Materials: Granite

Administration
- Archdiocese: Manila
- Deanery: Santo Niño
- Parish: Our Lady of the Most Holy Rosary

Clergy
- Rector: Esteban U. Lo
- Vicar: Aidan Zaballero

The Minor Basilica and National Shrine of San Lorenzo Ruiz, also known as Our Lady of the Most Holy Rosary Parish and commonly known as Binondo Church, is located in the district of Binondo, Manila, Philippines. It is under the jurisdiction of the Archdiocese of Manila. The church was founded by the Order of Preachers in 1596 to serve their Chinese converts to Christianity. The original building was destroyed in 1762 by British bombardment. A new granite church was completed on the same site in 1852 however it was greatly damaged during the Second World War, with only the western façade and the octagonal belfry surviving. The namesake shrine is dedicated to the first Filipino Saint, Lawrence Ruiz of Manila.

Pope John Paul II raised the shrine to the status of Minor Basilica via his decree Binondi in Frequenti on 23 July 1992. The decree was signed and notarized by Cardinal Angelo Sodano.

Catholic Masses are held in Tagalog, Mandarin, Hokkien, and English languages. The present parish priest and shrine rector is Reverend Esteban Lo.

== History ==
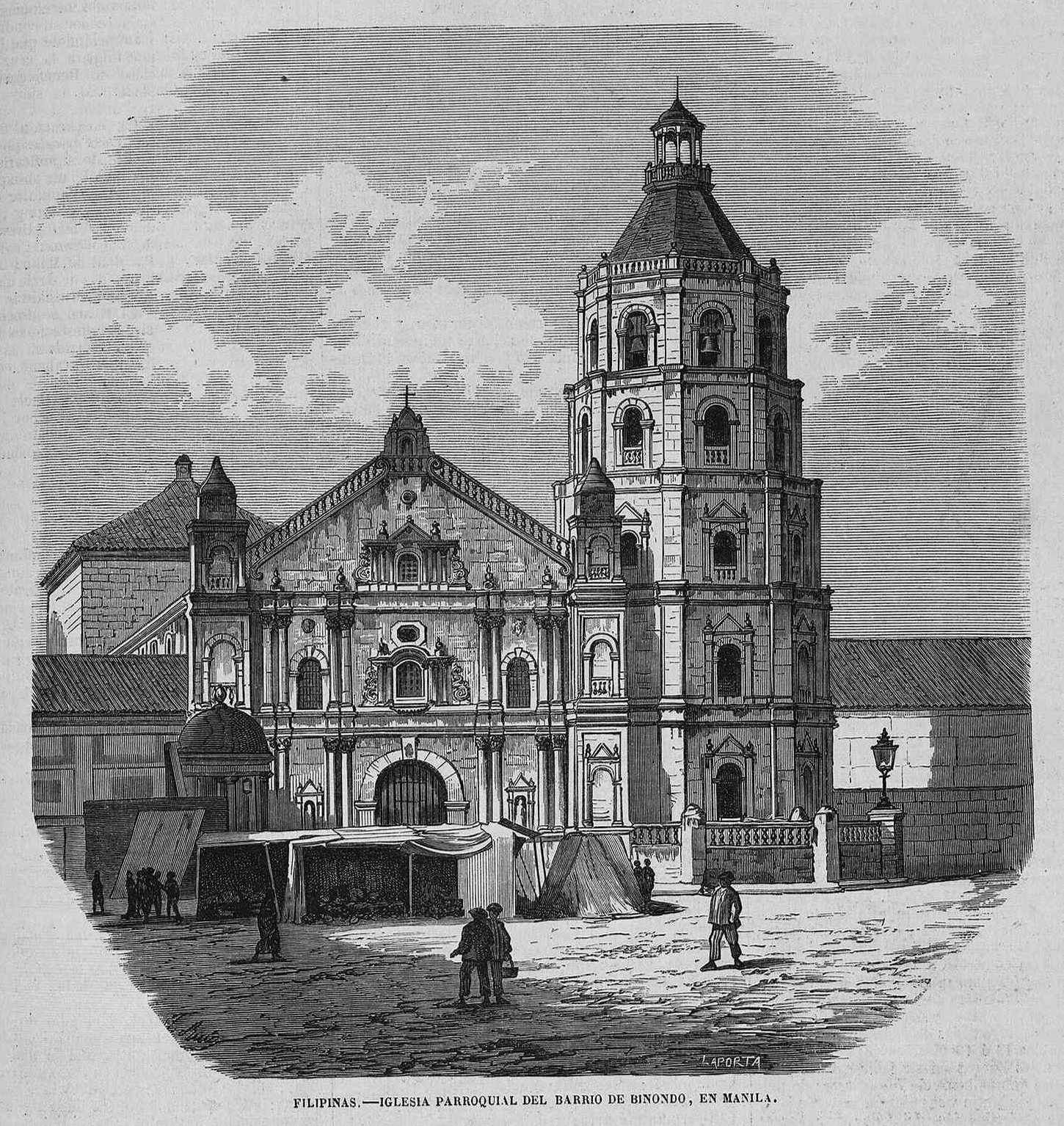
Parish church of the barrio of Binondo in 1868

Even before the arrival of the Spanish to the Philippines, there was already a community of Chinese traders living in Manila. The population of Chinese traders increased with the advent of Spanish colonization of the Philippines, due to increased trade between the islands. The upsurge in their population prompted the Catholic Missionaries to manage the conversion of the Chinese population to the Christian faith.

In 1596, Dominican priests founded Binondo church to serve their Chinese converts to Christianity as well as to the native Filipinos. A church was constructed before 1614. When transferred to its present site in the 18th century, a new church was built to accommodate new churchgoers. In 1778, the roof was replaced with nipa as the wood was destroyed by termites. In 1863, the church was slightly damaged by an earthquake. The original structure has sustained damages during wars and various natural disasters.

Chinese martyr John Alcober served as a priest in the church in the 18th century. Domingo Cruz y Gonzales supervised the construction of the dome in 1781.

American bombing during World War II on September 22, 1944, destroyed the structure. Almost everything, including the majority of the archives of the parish, were burned. Nothing was left behind except the stone walls of the church and the fire-tiered octagonal bell tower. After the war, Binondo parishioners had to make do with a roofless church for several years until it was rebuilt in the 1950s. The present church and convent were renovated between 1946 and 1971.

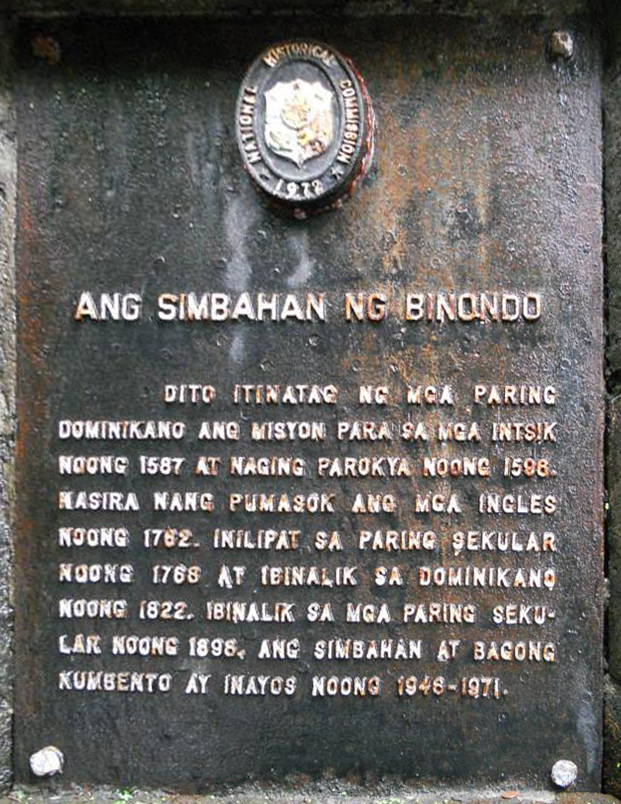
Church NHC historical marker installed in 1972

On July 23, 1992, Pope John Paul II approved the petition to elevate Binondo Church as a minor basilica. It was solemnly declared as such on October 25 of the same year by the former Archbishop of Manila, Cardinal Jaime Lachica Sin. On September 22, 2024, the Catholic Bishops Conference of the Philippines elevated the Binondo Church into a national shrine.

== Architecture ==
The current granite church completed in 1852 and features an octagonal pagoda-like bell tower which suggests the Chinese culture of the parishioners. The church was burned during the British invasion of 1762. Another one was quickly built following the occupation. Improvements were made in the 18th century but the edifice was again destroyed in the 1863 earthquake. It was rebuilt in the grandeur the remains on which we see today. Before the war, it was considered as one of the most beautiful churches in the country. Its bell tower was composed of five stories, octagonal in shape. At its top was a mirador (viewing window). This roof was destroyed during the 1863 earthquake.

The roof behind the pediment and the walls at the left of the façade are additions in the past years. The original façade, with some few renovations, is similar to that of the Italian High Renaissance churches. The façade is buttressed on the sides by pilaster mass terminated by urn-like decorations. A tower is found at the apex of the pediment. At the base of the pediment, along its central axis, is a small circular window framed by smaller columns and pediment which are framed by a foliated scroll. At the right is the huge, octagonal tower characterized by cantons at its angles and pedimented window openings.

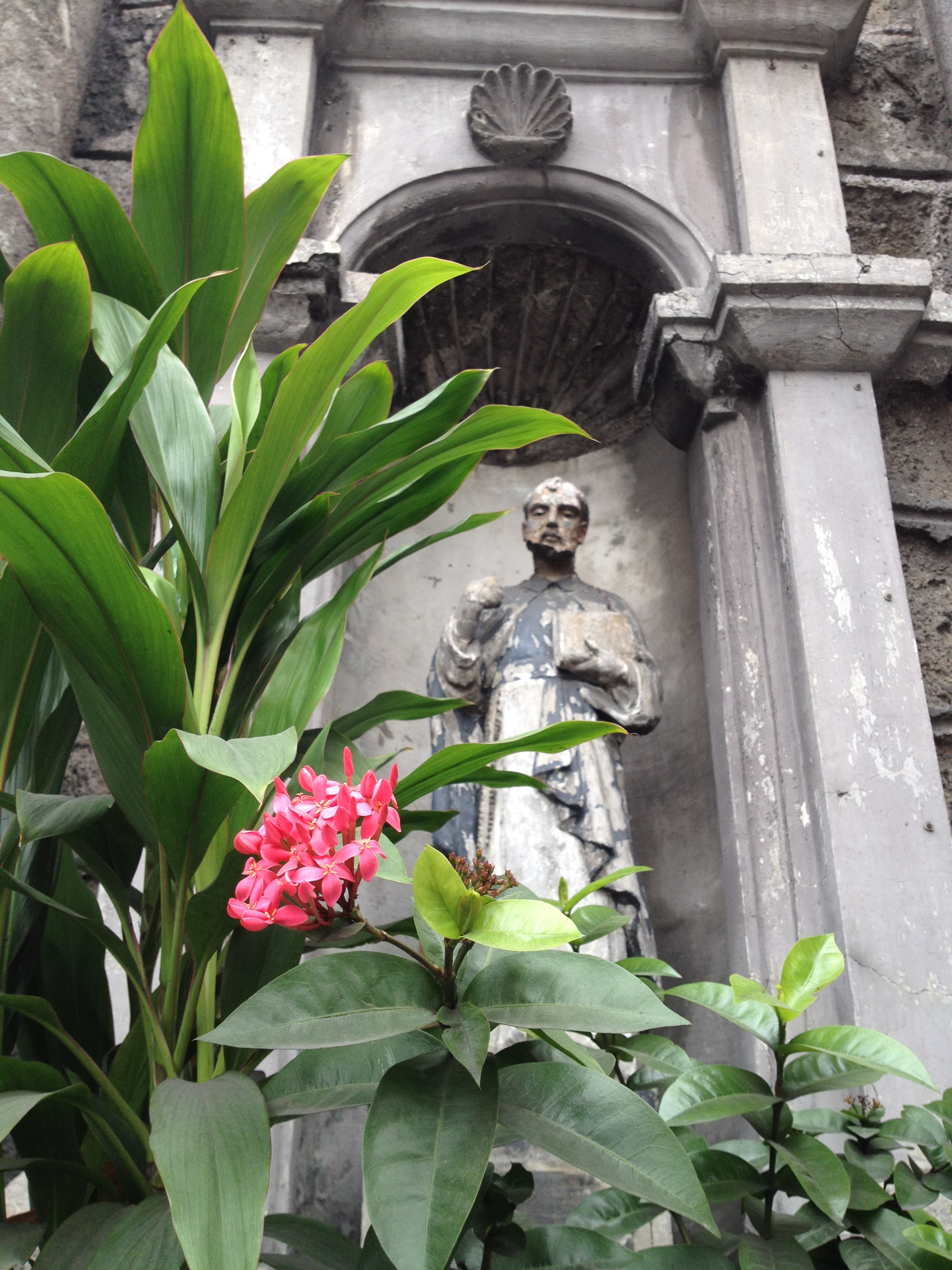
Dominican saint statue on the eastern flank

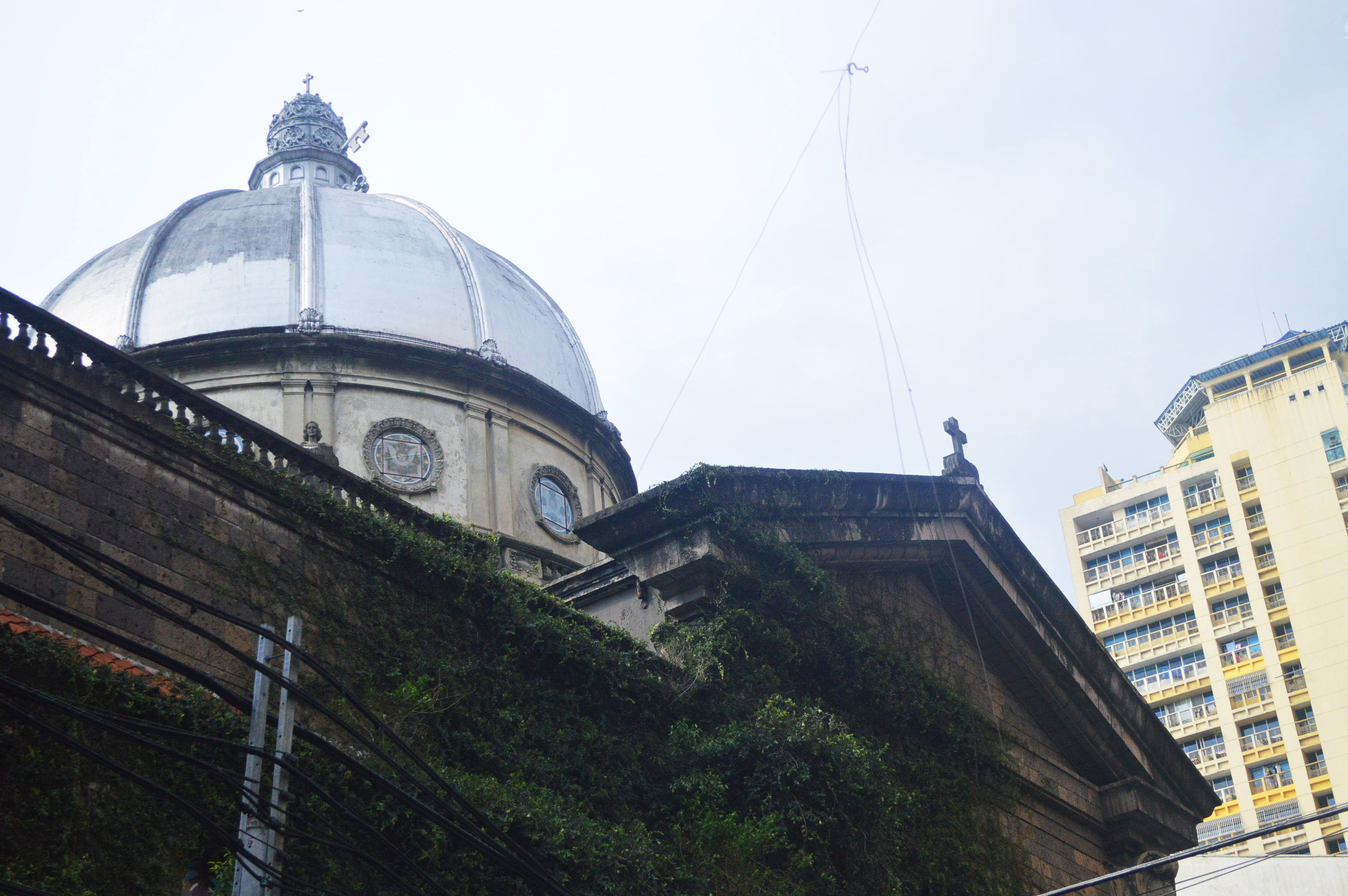
Dome of church, surmounted by a papal tiara and keys to denote its status as a basilica

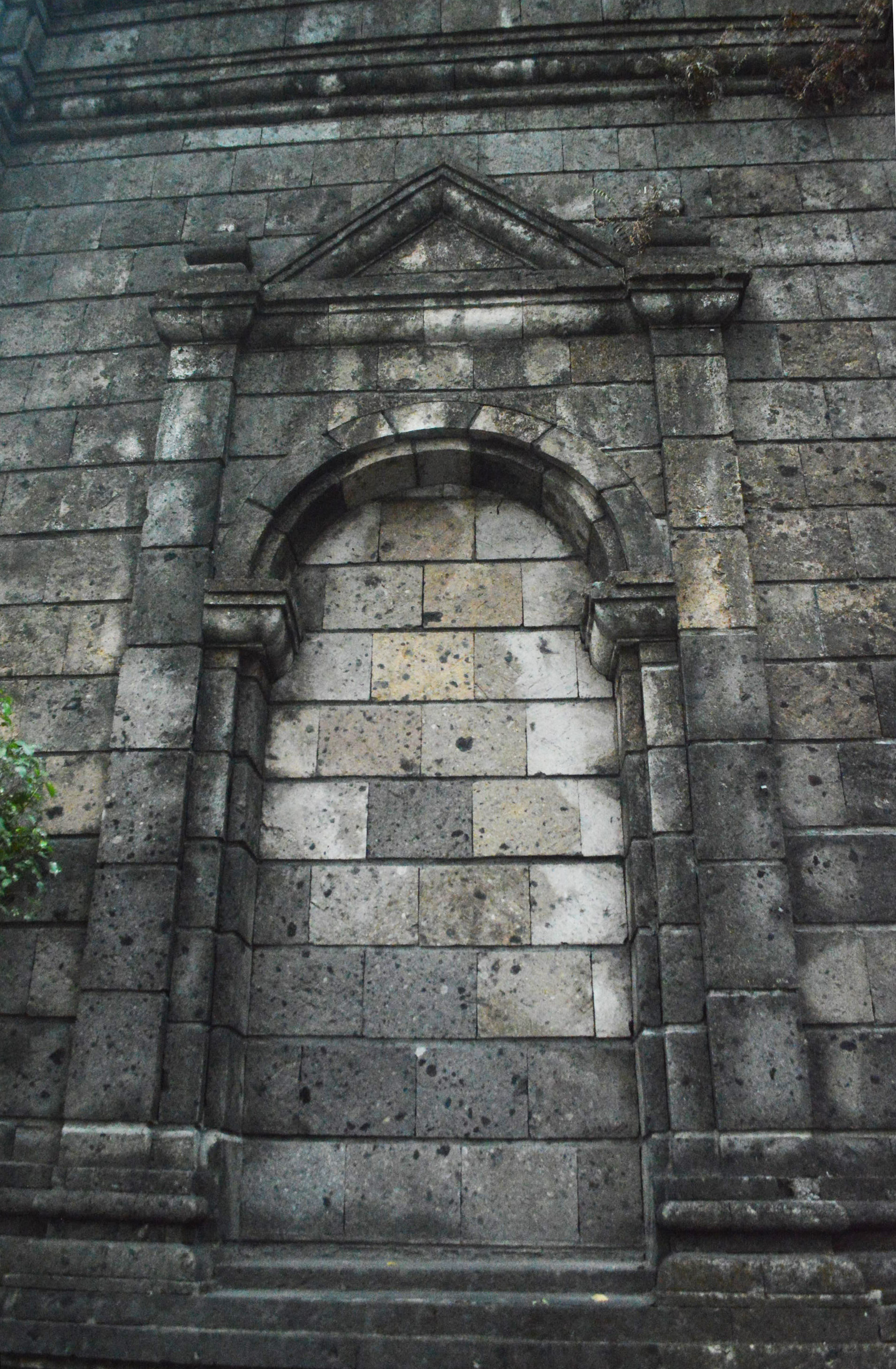
False window on the base of the belfry

Piedra china tombstone at entrance portal

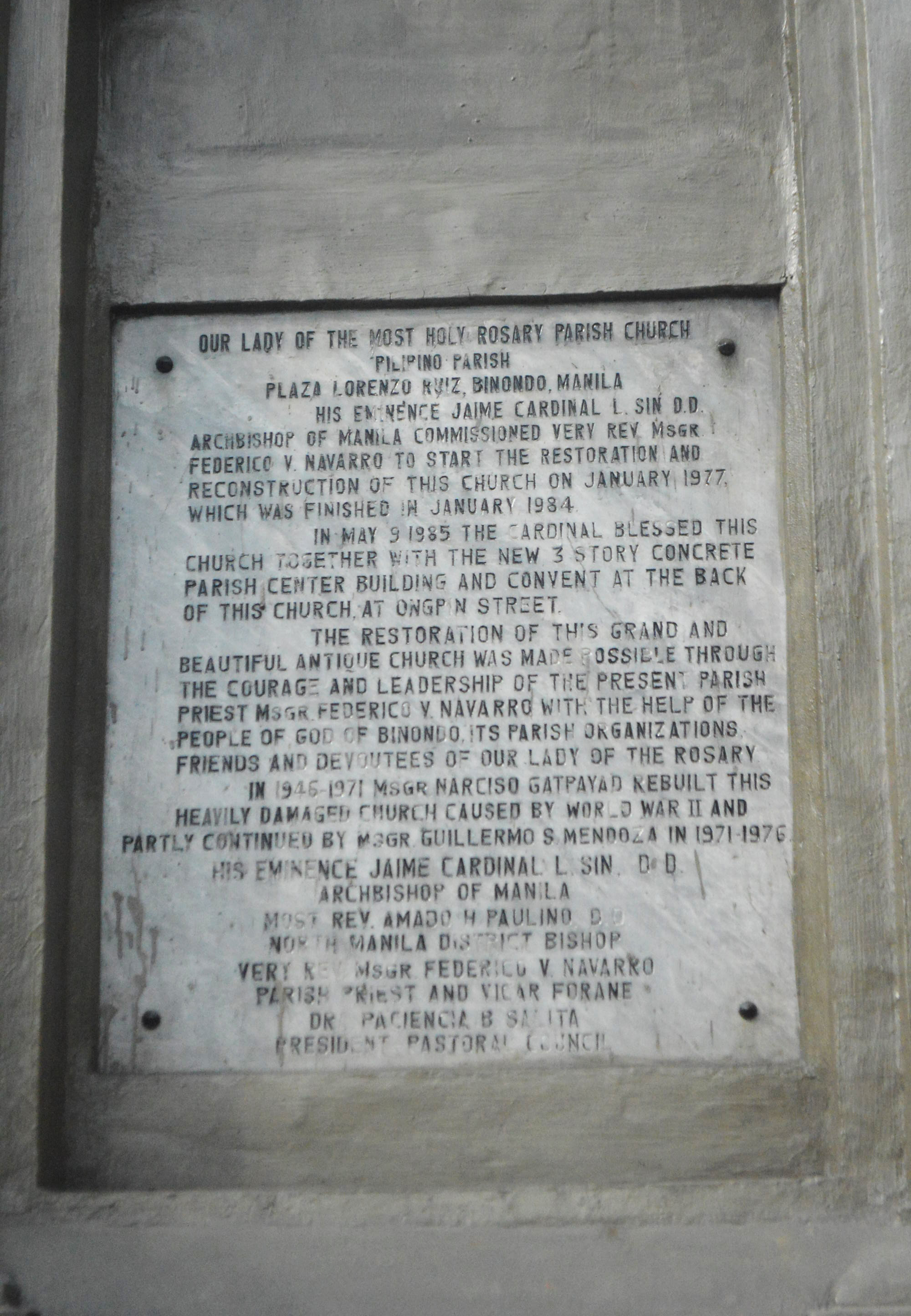
Marble plaque in front of the building

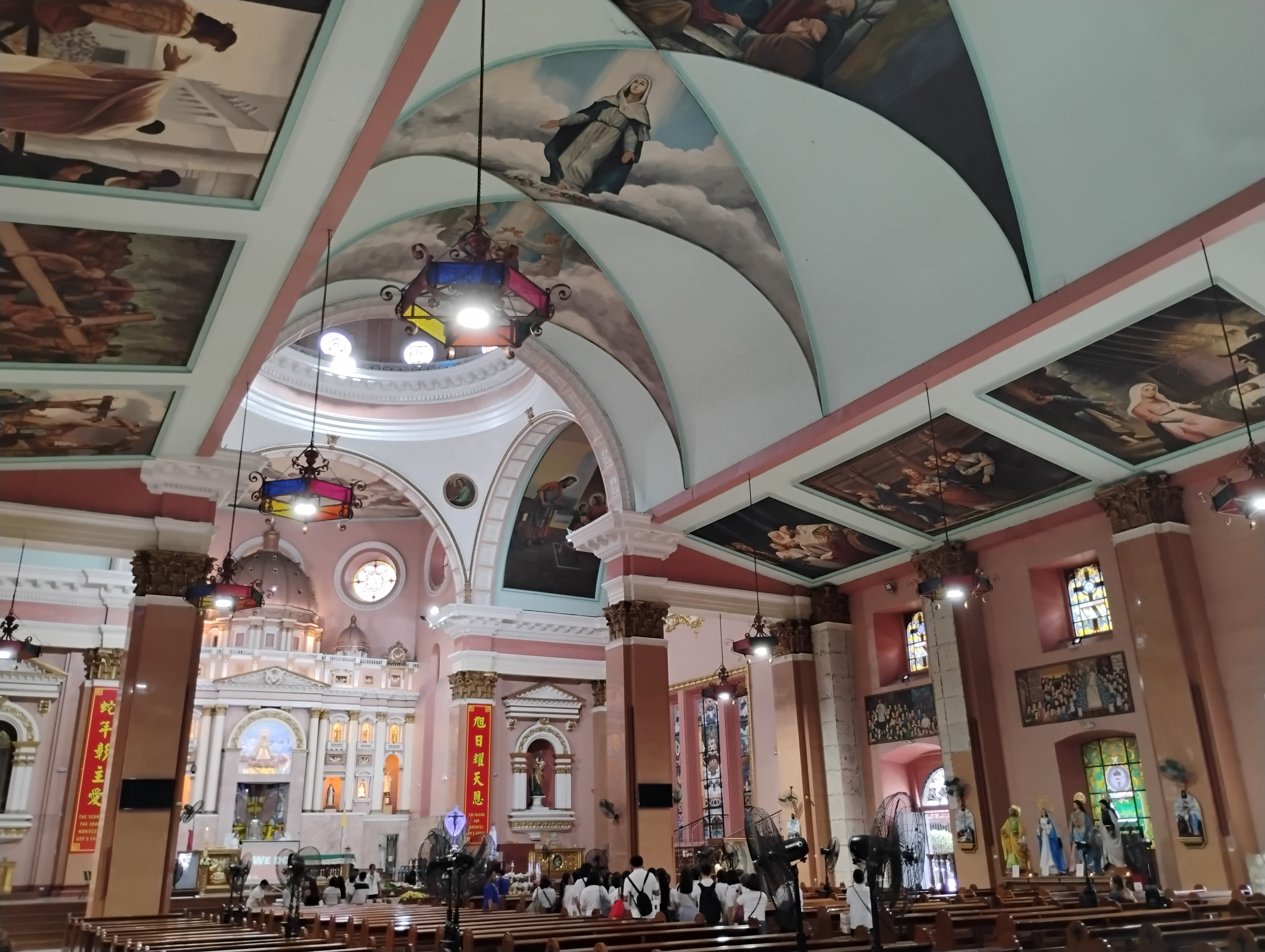
The church's interior

Church nave as seen from the narthex

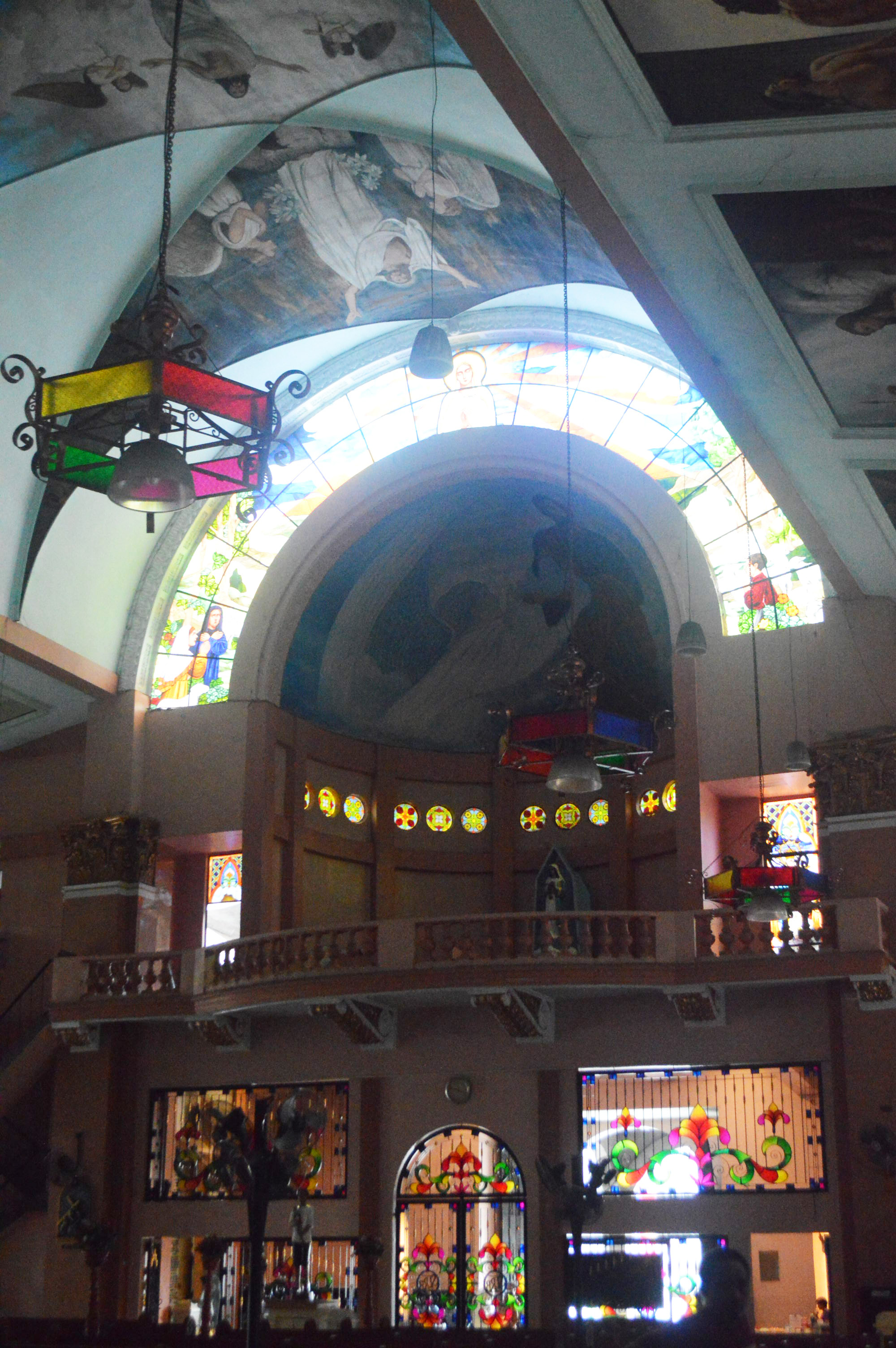
Choir loft and narthex, viewed from the nave

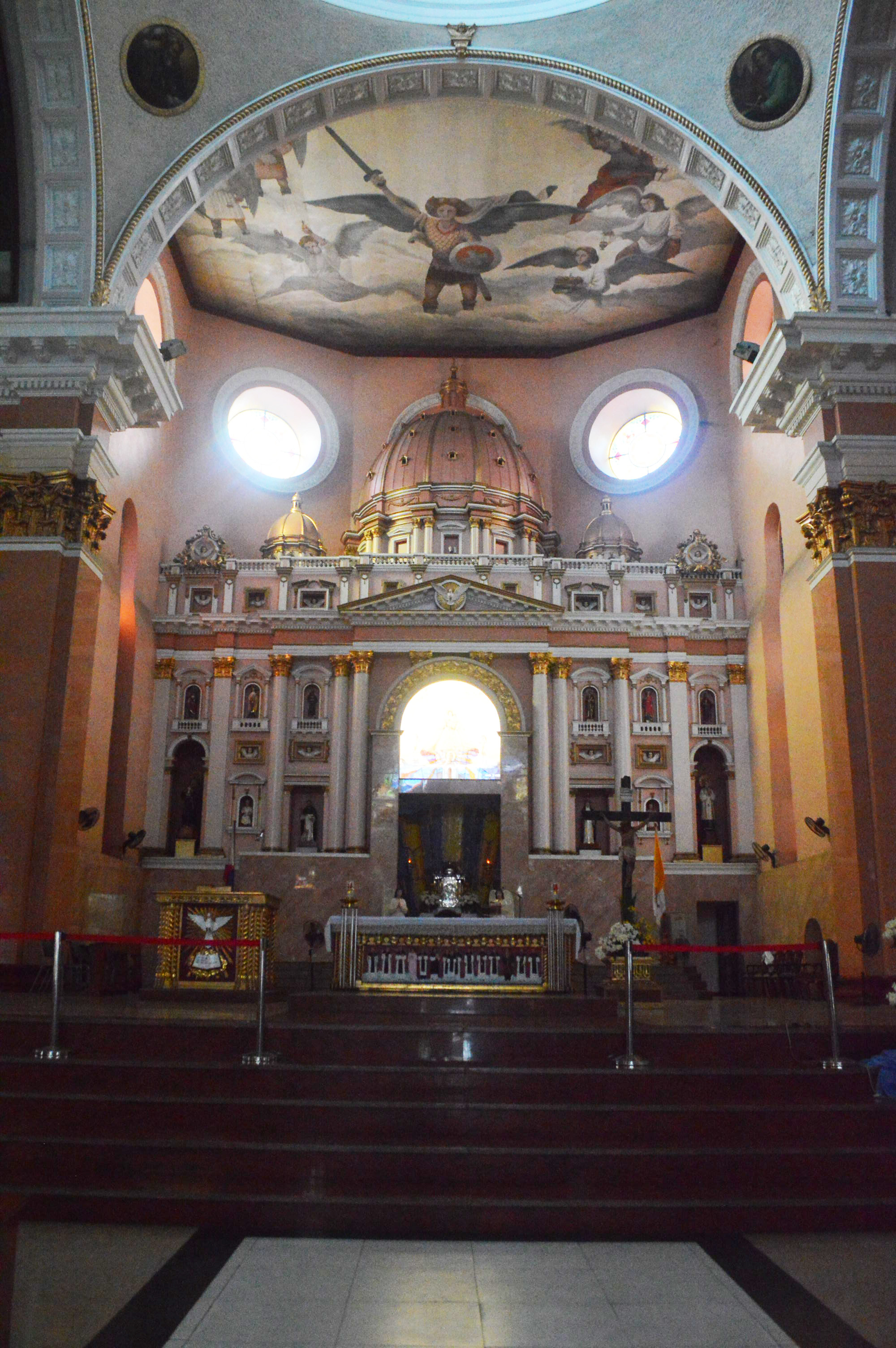
View of the apse and main altar, modeled after the façade of Saint Peter's Basilica

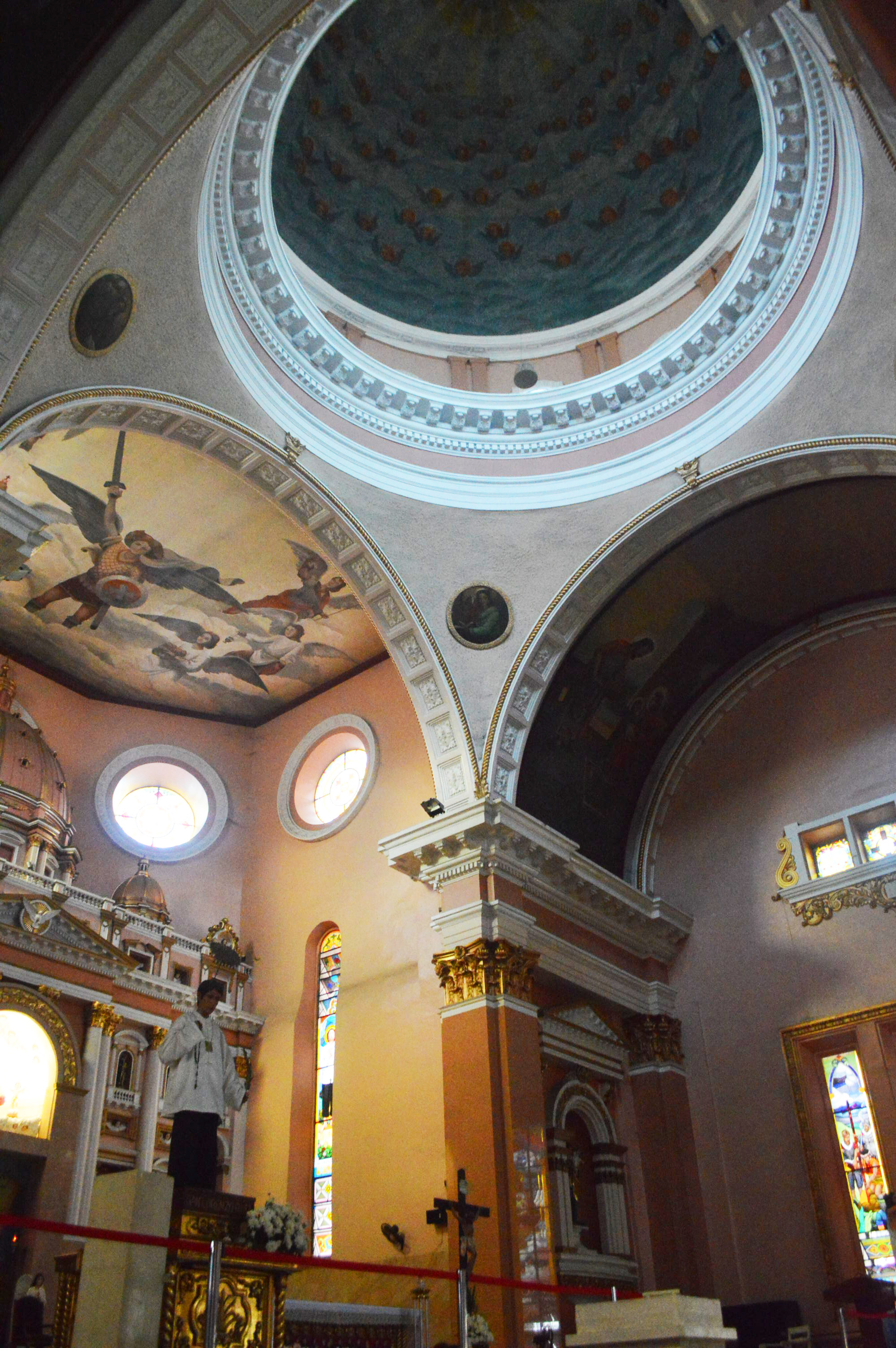
Arches, pendentives and inner dome

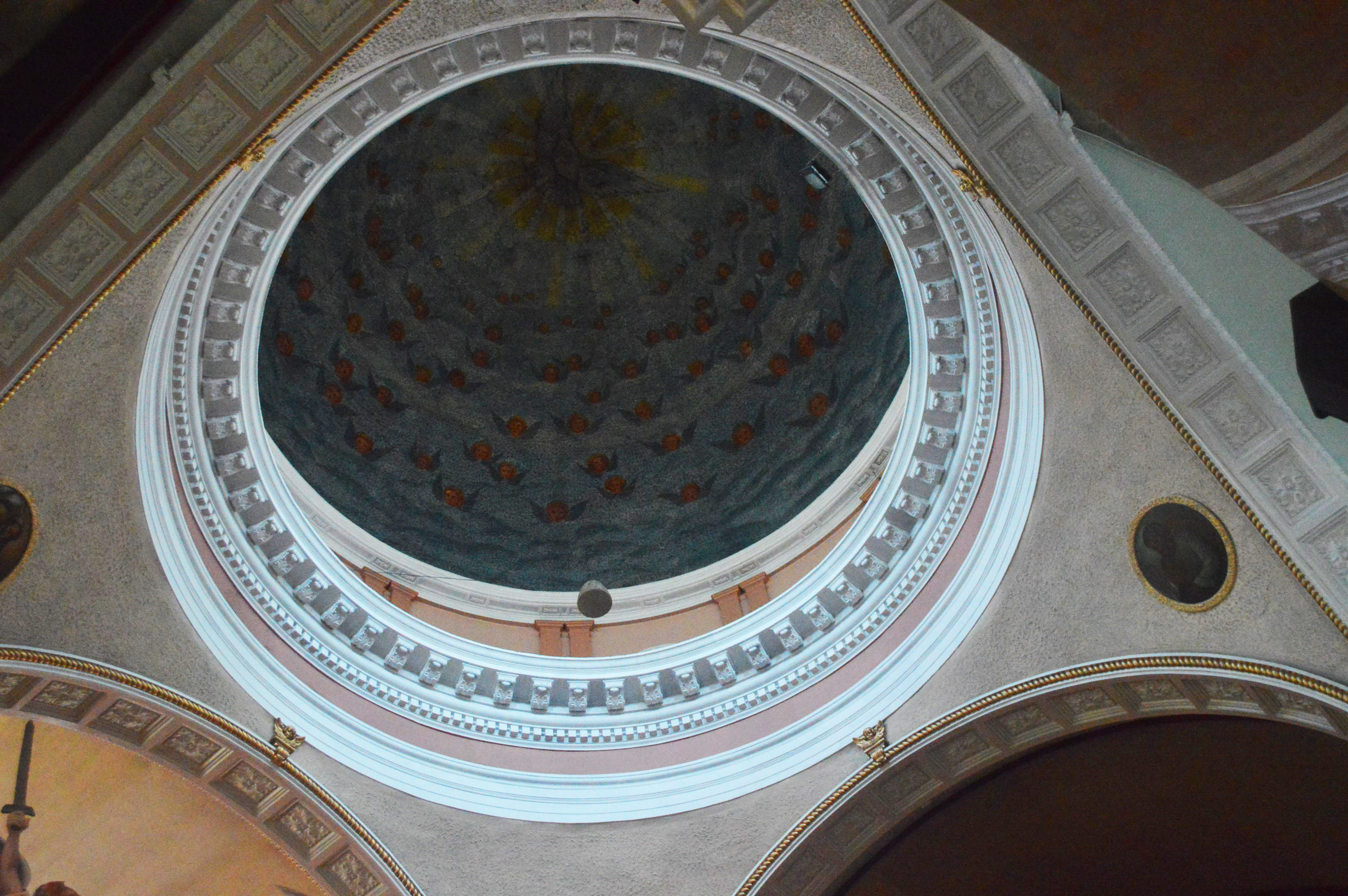
Dome detail with the Holy Ghost and angels, and small medallions of the Four Evangelists in the pendentives

== Trivia ==
- The current main altar of the church is loosely modeled after the façade of St. Peter's Basilica in Vatican City.
- The basilica has been reconstructed many times due to natural calamities and only the belfry is what remains of the original 16th-century structure.
- Andrés Bonifacio and his second wife Gregoria de Jesús were wed in Catholic rites in the church in March 1893 or 1894. The couple had also undergone a marriage ceremony under the Katipunan, the secret society that Bonifacio headed as part of the Philippine Revolution against the Spanish Empire.
