= Augustinian Recollect Province of Saint Ezequiél Moreno =

Order of Augustinian Recollects - Province of Saint Ezekiel Moreno
- Abbreviation: OAR
- Formation: 1588
- Type: Catholic religious order
- Headquarters: Viale dell'Astronomia 27, 00144, Rome, Italy
- Prior Provincial: Fr. Bernard C. Amparado, OAR
- Website: recoletos.ph

San Nicolás de Tolentino Parish, the Provincial House of the Order of Augustinian Recollects in the Philippines

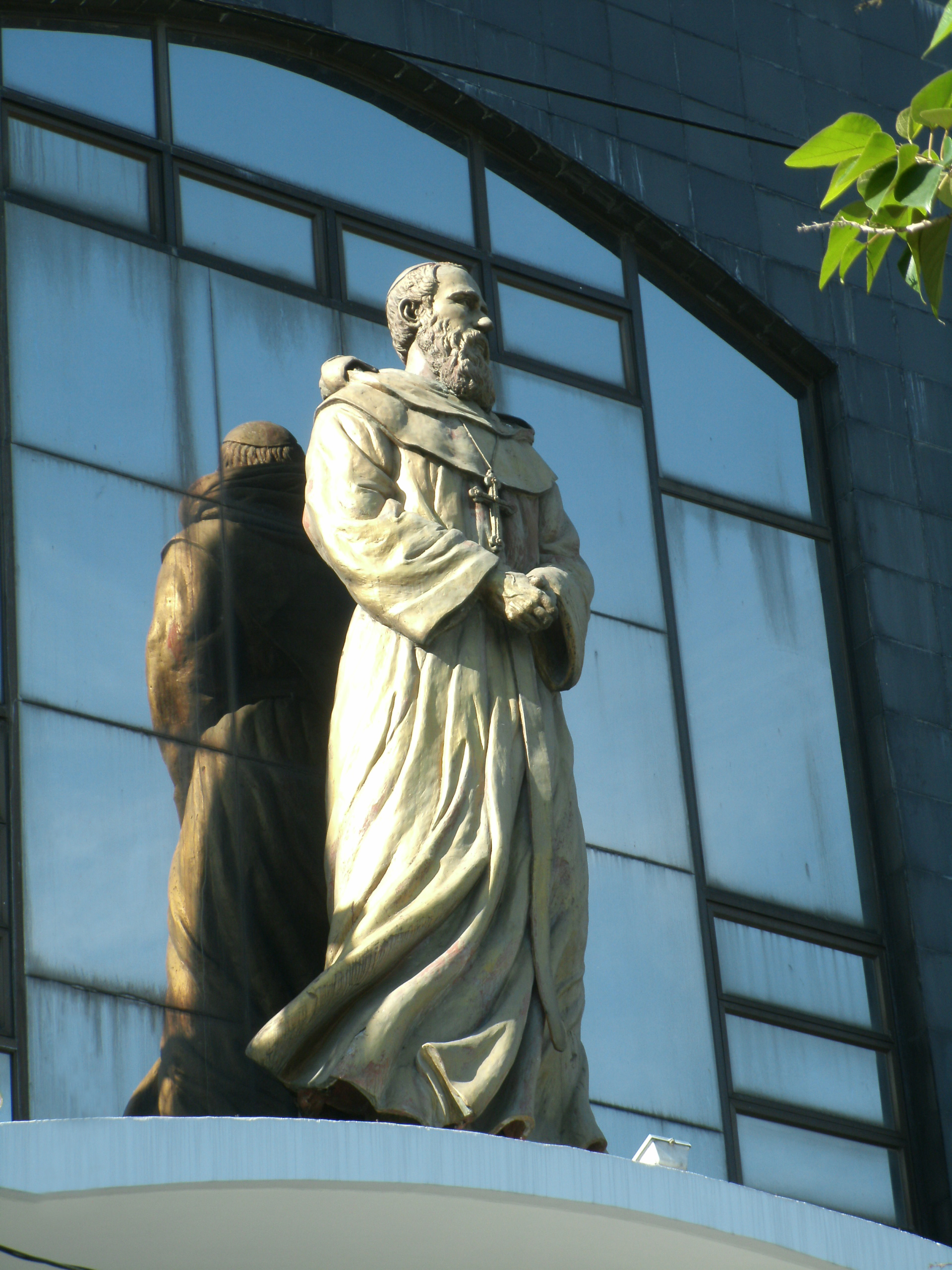
A life size statue of Saint Ezekiel Moreno at the Provincial House of the Recoletos in Quezon City

The Augustinian Recollect Province of Saint Ezequiél Moreno is a division of the Order of Augustinian Recollects that has jurisdiction over the Philippines, Taiwan and Sierra Leone. It officially separated from the Province of Saint Nicholas de Tolentine on 28 November 1998. Today, the Provincialate House is located at the San Nicolas De Tolentino Parish Church on Neptune Street, Congressional Subdivision, Project 6, Quezon City.

== The arrival of the Recollects in the Philippines ==
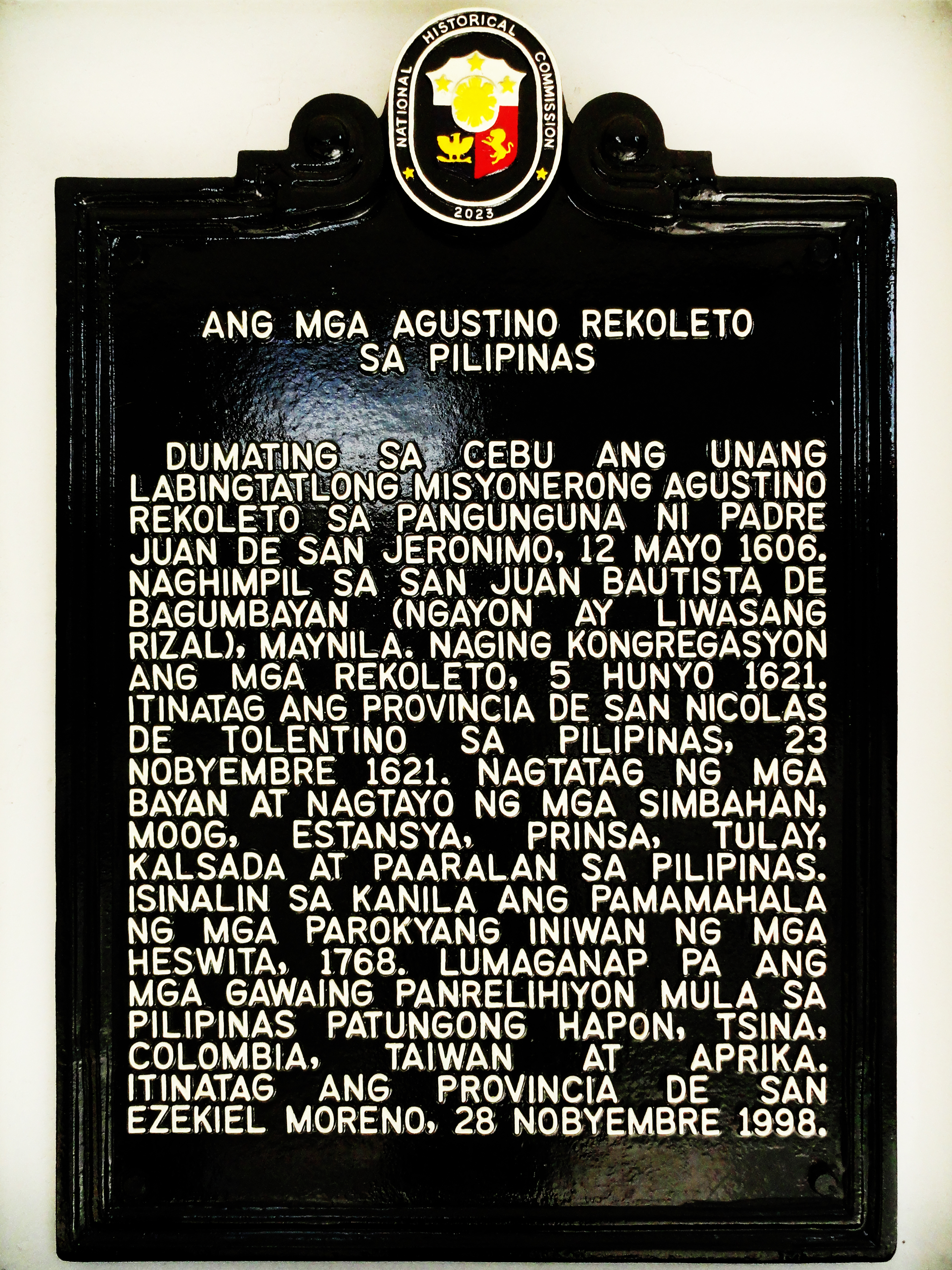
Historical marker for the order installed at the University of San Jose–Recoletos in Cebu City in 2023

Though the province was only created in 1998, the Recollect Mission came to Philippine soils quite early in its history. Just 17 years after the Recollection was formed in the Chapter of Toledo, 10 priests and 4 consecrated brothers sailed to the Philippines in order to heed the request of the Archbishop of Manila to help in the Christianization of the islands. And with their arrival on 12 May 1606 at the island of Cebu, they became the fifth order to be stalwarts of Philippine evangelization. Together with the Augustinians (who arrived first in 1575), the discalced Franciscans (1578), the Jesuits (1581) and the Dominicans (1587), they performed the task of not only Christianizing the Philippines but also to lay the foundations of many of its modern-day towns and cities.

=== The first Recoletos ===
The first Recollect mission to the Philippines was led by no less than the very first Prior Provincial Fray Juan de San Jerónimo. Together with him was Fr. Rodrigo de San Miguel, a man well versed not only in theology but in other sciences as well. Unfortunately, Fr. Andrés de San Nicolás did not make it to his destination but died at sea.

=== The first priories ===
Though they first set foot on the island of Cebu in 1606, the Recoletos built their first priory in the same year in Bagumbayan outside the walls of the present-day Intramuros. The house is still preserved by the national government until today, though it is in an uninhabitable state. The priory was dedicated to Saint John the Baptist and became one of the centers of devotion to Our Lady of Health for many years.

Three years later, they founded another house within the walls which became their Provincial House until the end of World War II. It was dedicated to St. Nicolas de Tolentino, an Italian visionary and Patron Saint of the souls in Purgatory and of mariners.

In 1616, they also founded a house in Cavite and went back to Cebu in 1621 to found yet another one. In the same year, they also began constructing the order's most prominent sanctuary in history, the Minor Basilica of San Sebastian.

== Missionary activities ==
=== Philippine missions ===
In reality, the Recollection was not meant to be active. The Fifth Determination of the Chapter of Toledo was clear that the original motive of its creation was to be more contemplative. Their main plan was to live more radically their life of prayer and community. Because of this, their original priories were not parishes but contemplative houses.

However, the difference in setting of the Philippines was so different that the missionaries in the Philippines needed to have a more active role. Filipinos flocked to their doors every Sunday to attend the Holy Mass and they had no choice but to open their doors. In 1607, they were officially given the charge to Christianize the towns of Bagac, Bataan. They also founded in the same year a community in Masinloc, Zambales, which is considered their first real parish. And finally, at the end of the decade (1609), they also were made in charge of Bolinao, Pangasinan.

On 1 March 1621, the colonial government divided the island of Mindanao into two. The northeastern section of the island was given to the Recollects while the rest was given to the Jesuits. Their most prominent area was in Butuan, Cateel, and the Dinagat Islands. However, during the Jesuit Expulsion, the task was left solely on their shoulders.

Also, on 1621, the Recollects were given the northern Cebu as part of their mission.

Perhaps, the province that carries the heaviest imprints of the Recollect mission is the island of Negros (now divided into Negros Occidental and Negros Oriental). Given to them in 1626, the Recollects not only founded parishes but also the very towns they have today. Today, most of the names of their towns bear the same names as those of Spain, mainly those areas where the missionaries came from.

Other areas that were given to them were the islands of Romblon, Banton and Tablas in 1635. The Recollect missionaries from Mexico brought along with them the image of Nuestra Señora de la Salud which, according to Fr. Rommel L. Rubia, “was a precious gift from the Discalced (Barefoot) Carmelite nuns of Mexico to the Recollect missionaries on their way to their missions in the Philippines”. Mindoro was added to their charge in 1679 and eight years later, the island of Masbate. Finally, they were also given some areas in the present-day Quezon Province in 1658.

In 1712, the Governor-General Martin Ursua y Arizmendi, ordered the establishment of the towns along Pampanga - Pangasinan route to secure travelers from Aeta and Zambal raids. Incidentally, in the same year, the spiritual administration of the Zambales was restored to the Augustinian Recollects after a prolonged dispute with the Dominicans. The Recollects opposed the governor's order because of the inherent difficulty of its execution. But the governor insisted. He even invoked the name of the King in his second request and order. The Recollects bowed in obedience. They sent the best devout missionaries to start the missions. Soon, the towns of Mabalacat and Panipoan or Bamban and Capas were established.

A Philippine census in 1734 undertaken by the Catholic Church surveyed that the Recollects are present in 19 dioceses in "Mindoro, Caraga, Bisaya and Calamianes towns with 53,384 souls.”

=== Role In Philippine Nationalism ===
The Recollects had a pivotal role in causing and guiding the Philippine Revolution since when the Jesuits were suppressed (For their anti-colonial tendencies in the Jesuit missions among the Guaraní) they moved to the Jesuits' vacated parishes and gave their former parishes to the Filipino Secular/Diocesan Clergy giving Diocesan Clergy like the famous martyrs Gomburza who were militating under the issue of the Secularization movement in the Philippines, their own parishes, before the return of the Jesuits forced them to retake their parishes from the Diocesan Clergy.

The opposition of the other religious orders against an autonomous diocesan clergy independent of them (With the possible exception of the Recollects and Jesuits) lead to the martyrdom of Filipino Diocesan priests Mariano Gomez, José Burgos, Jacinto Zamora collectively known as Gomburza who were wrongly implicated in the Cavite Mutiny, since the Spanish feared that because a priest, Rev. Fr. Miguel Hidalgo lead the Mexican war of independence against Spain, the same would happen in the Philippines. Furthermore, the Governor General who was a Freemason, Rafael Izquierdo y Gutiérrez upon discovering the Cavite Mutiny was led by fellow Freemasons: Maximo Innocencio, Crisanto de los Reyes, and Enrique Paraiso; the Governor-General as per his Masonic vow to protect fellow brothers of the Craft, shifted the blame to Gomburza since they had inspired ethnic pride among Filipinos due to their campaign for reform. The Governor-General asked the Catholic hierarchy in the person of Archbishop of Manila Gregorio Meliton Martinez to have them declared as heretics and defrocked but he refused as he believed in Gomburza's innocence. As the Imperial government executed Gomburza, churches all across the territory were rung in mourning. This inspired the Jesuit educated and future National Hero Jose Rizal to form the La Liga Filipina, to ask for reforms from Spain and recognition of local clergy.

Rizal was executed and the La Liga Filipina dissolved. As cries for reform were ignored, formerly loyal Filipinos were radicalized and the 1896 Philippine revolution was triggered when the Spanish discovered the anti-colonial secret organisation Katipunan (formed with Masonic rites in mind, and Freemasonry is traditionally Anti-Catholic, yet were dedicated to the martyred priests Gomburza as Gomburza was a password in the Katipunan), the Katipunan waged the revolution leading to the end of Spanish rule. However, there was conflict between Filipino Masons in the Katipunan and American Masons as a result of the Philippine-American War.

By 1898, the year that the Filipinos declared independence from Spain, the Recollects were attending to about 1,203,399 souls in 203 towns and 20 provinces in the Philippines.

=== Foreign missions ===
The Recollect missionaries in the Philippines did not content themselves with Christianizing the Philippines. They also embarked on an ambitious mission to other areas, most notably in Japan. Despite the scarcity of resources, they began an arduous mission to the said country 1623. The mission was begun by Spanish Fr. Francisco de Jesús and the Portuguese Fr. Vicente Carvalho and sowed the seeds of Christianity in Unzen, in the island of Kyushu. Their mission blessed the order with its very first martyrs in Japan. The two priests were subjected to slow fire on 3 September 1623.

Their fate was repeated in the person of Fr. Melchor de San Agustín and Fr. Martín de San Nicolás in 1632. However, before the two died, they were able to give some catechetical instruction to a young girl named Magdalene in the Prefecture of Nagasaki. She later became a member of the Tertiary and became the order's very first saint.

Given that the Spanish dominions over the Pacific were under the management of the Captaincy General of the Philippines, the province also sent missions to some of the islands of the Marianas.

Presently, the Philippine province is also in charge of the mission in Taiwan and Sierra Leone.

== Other related organizations ==
=== Augustinian Recollect Sisters ===
Founded by the Dionisia Talangpaz and her sister Cecilia Rosa Talangpaz on 16 July 1728, the Augustinian Recollect Sisters is the second oldest congregation in the Philippines after the Religious of the Virgin Mary. It also holds the honor of being the third oldest congregation founded in Asia.

It was originally an organization of Tertiaries but later on developed into a full congregation. The congregation is perpetually united to the Order of Augustinian Recollects in many ties. It is one of the active congregations belonging to the Augustinian Recollects family and a fruit brought forth out of the missionary zeal of the Order.

The primitive Augustinian Recollect Fathers guided the two foundresses and the first community of beatas. They directed the Beaterio from its earlier stage of growth and development until it was canonically erected as a diocesan religious congregation on 19 August 1929 through the recommendation of the Reverend Father Gerardo Larrondo, the incumbent Prior General of the Recollect Friars; and through the benevolence of the Most Reverend Michael O'Doherty, then, Archbishop of Manila.

Still with the nurturing assistance of the Augustinian Recollect Order, juridical autonomy was procured for the congregation which subsequently was declared an Institute of Pontifical Right by the Holy See on 20 November 1970, under the pontificate of Pope Paul VI.

=== The Secular Augustinian Recollect Fraternity ===
The Secular Augustinian Recollect Fraternity is the Third Order or Tertiary of the Order of Augustinian Recollects. Founded as early as the 1650s in the town of Bolinao, Pangasinan, these pious men and women share in the charism of the Recoletos in their daily lives.

In fact, the history of the Secular Augustinian Recollects is so fruitful in the province that it is from this province that the first martyr and saint of the order came in the person of Magdalene of Nagasaki.

Aside from this wondrous saint, the Secular Augustinian Recollect was also blessed with other heroic people like Calara Calima and Isabel. In fact, the modern-day Augustinian Recollect Sisters were members of the SARF during their earlier times.

Today, with more than 400 members scattered all over the archipelago, the Philippines Tertiaries are the second most numerous both in terms of nationality and provincial affinity.

=== Recollect Augustinian Youth ===
Considered the Fourth member, this organization aims to form the modern youth with the spirituality of Saint Augustine. Recollect Augustinian Youth aims to pray for the saints, the religious men and women, and also the priest. They also preach about vocations and the true essence of St. Augustine and its works.

== OAR and education ==
Aside from administering parishes, the OAR, in another good way to further help the Philippines, is to educate their people. Therefore, the Recollects began founding learning institutions as well. Scattered all over the country, these institutions are considered to be one of the centers of learning in their respective areas.

=== Institutions with university status ===
- University of Negros Occidental - Recoletos – fondly called as UNO-Recoletos or simply UNO-R, the school was founded in 1941 in Talisay City, Negros Occidental, and later moved to its present location in Bacolod. It is the first institution in the city and in the province. It was elevated to university status on May 15, 1957. Though not actually founded by the Recollects, the management was transferred to them on May 25, 1962, with Fr. Federico Terradillos, OAR as its first rector. The school patron is San Nicolás de Tolentino, the patron of souls in Purgatory.
- University of San Jose - Recoletos – also known as USJ-R. Founded in 1947, it is one of Cebu's centers of learning. It received university status on September 21, 1984, and by 2001, it was granted autonomy by the Commission on Higher Education. Also in 2003, it was granted Level 3 accreditation by the PAASCU. It has 3 campuses within the island of Cebu and the school patron is St. Ezekiel Moreno.

=== Institutions with college status ===
- San Sebastian College - Recoletos de Manila – founded in 1941, it remains the only Recollect institution in Metro Manila. It also has a satellite campus in Canlubang, Laguna. Baste, as it is fondly called by its students, is most popularly known because of its 5-year consecutive win in the National Collegiate Athletic Association. It also remains as one of the main institutions of learning for law.
- San Sebastian College - Recoletos de Cavite – though bearing the same name, the institution in Cavite City developed separately from that of Manila. Founded in 1966 as an all-male school, it opened its doors to accept women in 1986.

=== Institutions offering secondary programs ===
- Colegio de Santo Tomas - Recoletos – established in 1940 in San Carlos City, Negros Occidental
- Colegio San Nicolas de Tolentino - Recoletos – formerly called the UNO-R High School Talisay Branch, it was previously a satellite high school campus of the University of Negros Occidental - Recoletos until it got separated and established as an independent school. It is located in Talisay City, Negros Occidental.
- San Pedro Academy - Recoletos – located at Barangay Caidiocan, Valencia, Negros Oriental
- San Pedro Academy - Recoletos – located at Barangay Poblacion, Valencia, Negros Oriental

=== Seminaries and theological houses ===
- Santo Tomas de Villanueva Recoletos Formation House – the order's Minor Seminary located in San Carlos City, Negros Occidental
- Casiciaco Recoletos Seminary – also called the Seminario Mayor - Recoletos de Baguio and offers philosophy in Baguio
- Recoletos Formation Center – the Theology House in Mira-Nila Homes, Quezon City
- San Ezequiel Moreno Novitiate – Recoletos - the novitiate house in Antipolo, Rizal

== Notable Recoletos who worked in the province ==
=== Recollect saints ===
- Saint Ezequiél Moreno y Díaz (9 April 1848 - 19 August 1906) - patron of the province. Born in Alfaro, La Rioja, Spain, the saint arrived in the Philippines on 10 February 1870. He was ordained a priest by the Archbishop of Manila, the Most Reverend Gregorio Melitón Martínez on 2 June 1871. He was missionary to many of the archipelago, most notably in Palawan where he founded the Cathedral of the Apostolic Vicariate of Puerto Princesa. He was later sent to Colombia where he was appointed as bishop of Pasto.
- Saint Magdalene of Nagasaki -
- Martyrs of Motril -

=== Recollect martyrs ===
- Reverend Father Agustín Miño - first missionary to Bataan and Zambales. Considered the Recollect proto-martyr of the Philippines.

=== Other notable Recoletos ===
- Archbishop José Aranguren - first Recollect Archbishop of Manila who reigned from 19 January 1846 to 18 April 1861.
- Br. Matías Carbonel (1806–1861) - built the Isabel II Bridge in Imus, Cavite which is still being used until now.
- Fr. Diego Cera - former Parish Priest of San José Parish in Las Piñas. He is known as the mind behind the construction of the famous Bamboo Organ, which is still in a very good state until now. The parish attracts an international audience every February through its Bamboo Organ Festival.

== See also ==
- Order of Augustinian Recollects
- Augustinian Recollect Sisters
- Secular Augustinian Recollect Fraternity
