= San Nicolas de Tolentino Parish Church (Quezon City) =

Roman Catholic church in Quezon City, Philippines

- Church of Nicholas of Tolentino
- Simbahan ni San Nicolas Tolentino
- San Nicolas de Tolentino Parish Church
- 14°40′20″N 121°02′15″E
- Location: Congressional Subd., Project 6, Quezon City
- Country: Philippines
- Denomination: Roman Catholic
- Religious institute: Augustinian Recollects

History
- Status: Parish church
- Consecrated: 1975

Architecture
- Architectural type: Church building
- Style: Modern architecture
- Completed: 1975

Specifications
- Materials: Sand, gravel, cement, mortar and steel

Administration
- Archdiocese: Manila
- Diocese: Cubao

Clergy
- Priest(s): Rev. Fr. Nino Cesar Ruiz, OAR

San Nicolas de Tolentino Parish Church is a Roman Catholic parish church in Quezon City, Philippines. It belongs to the Diocese of Cubao, under the Vicariate of Sto. Nino. The church is under the care of the Augustinian Recollect Province of Saint Ezequiél Moreno.

The parish was named after San Nicolas de Tolentino, the patron saint of the poor souls in Purgatory, whose feast day is celebrated on September 10. Recollect fathers expanded their apostolate by building a church, which later became the center of a sprawling parish extending from Visayas Avenue in the east, to Mindanao Avenue in the west, from Carmel II in the south to Tandang Sora in the north.

Established on April 30, 1975, it was on May 11, 1975, that Fr. Alejandro Ramirez, OAR, was installed as the first parish priest, with Fr. Antonio Ausejo, OAR, and Fr. Clemente Jubera, OAR, as assistants. In response to the demand of the faithful, the parish was divided in two: Our Father Parish and Our Lady of Annunciation Parish were created within the San Nicholas de Tolentino territory. The current Parish Priest is Father Niño Cesar R. Ruiz, OAR with estimated population of 10, 000 Catholics.

== Nuestra Señora de la Salud ==
In 1634, the Nuestra Señora de la Salud small miraculous statue was brought by the Order of Augustinian Recollects from Mexico. The 381-year-old ivory with precious jewellery was Mexican Discalced Carmelites gift to the Augustinian Recollect priests. It was first enthroned in the Church of San Juan de Bagumbayan in Intramuros in 1634 and translated to the San Nicolas Church in Intramuros where it survived the 1945 Battle of Manila bombing. Later, it was housed at the San Sebastian Basilica sacristy. In 1970, the Vicar Provincial placed it in Quezon City and returned it in 1988 to the San Agustin Church Museo. In December 2016, however, after hibernating for 72 years, the devotion was revived. In December 2018, due to the miraculous healing of 68-year old Greg Montes of multiple organ dysfunction syndrome, San Nicolas de Tolentino Parish Church in Bago Bantay, Quezon City revived the first ever Novena to Our Lady of Good Health.

== See also ==
- Augustinian Recollect Province of Saint Ezequiél Moreno
- List of religious buildings in Metro Manila
- Our Lady of Good Health
