= San Sebastian College – Recoletos =

Roman Catholic college in Manila, Philippines

San Sebastian College-Recoletos
- Colegio de San Sebastián-Recoletos
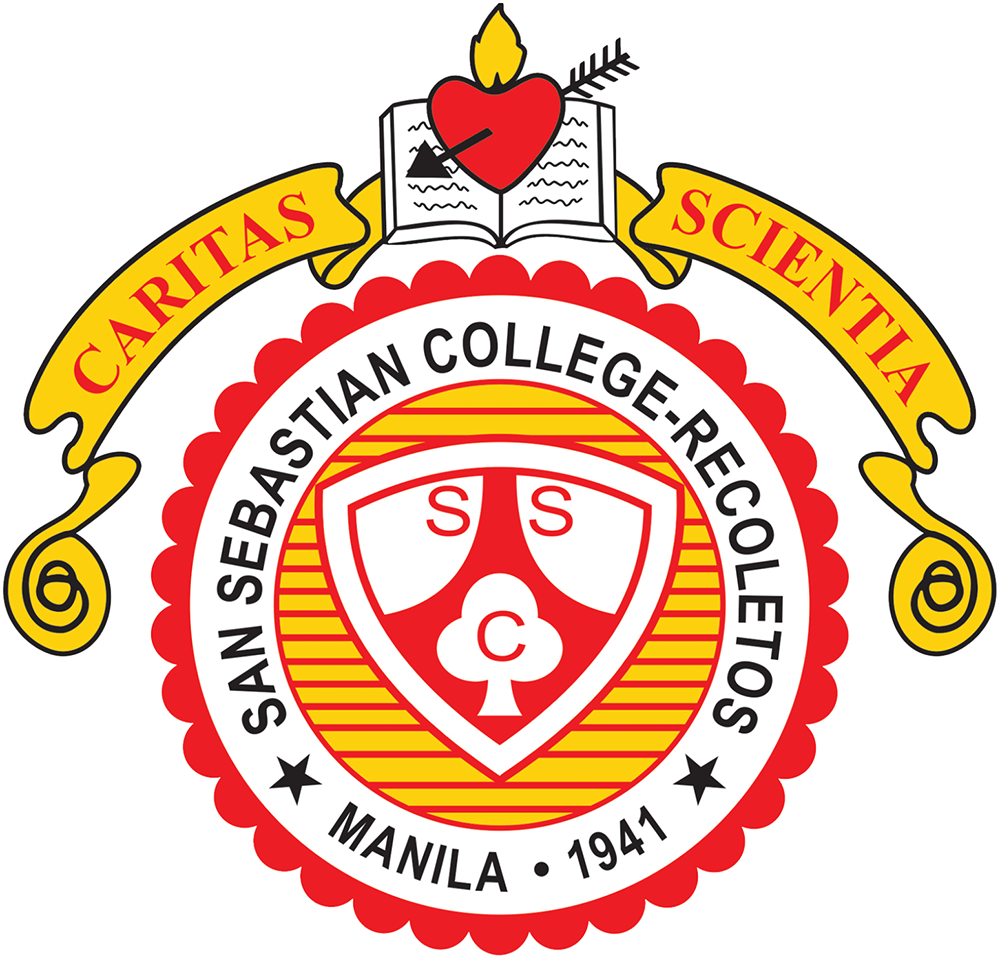
- Opening Minds, Forming Hearts
- Other names: SSC-R, SSCR, San Sebastian, Bastê, Recoletos de Manila
- Motto: Caritas et Scientia (Latin)
- Motto in English: Knowledge based on Love
- Type: Private, Roman Catholic, Coeducational Basic and Higher education institution
- Established: March 23, 1941 (85 years and 215 days)
- Founders: Rev. Fr. Gregorio I. Espiga, OAR
- Religious affiliation: Roman Catholic (Augustinian Recollects)
- Academic affiliations: ACUCA, ASEACCU, PAASCU
- President: Rev. Fr. Romeo Ben A. Potencio Jr., OAR
- Location: 2114-A Recto Avenue (formerly Azcarraga), Manila, NCR, 1001, Philippines; 14°36′01″N 120°59′22″E
- Campus: 2 hectares (4.9 acres); Main campus: Recto, Manila; Satellite campus: Canlubang, Calamba, Laguna; Surigao City, Surigao del Norte (satellite law school)
- Language: English, Filipino, Spanish
- Alma Mater song: San Sebastian Hymn
- Colors: Red and Gold
- Nickname: Sebastinian
- Sporting affiliations: NCAA
- Mascot: Golden Stags
Sports
Basketball Volleyball Swimming Chess	Tennis Table tennis Track Taekwondo
- athletics: Varsity team names: Golden Stags (college men's varsity teams); Lady Golden Stags (college women's varsity teams); Golden Staglets (High School boys' varsity teams); Lady Golden Staglets (High School girls' varsity teams)
- Website: www.sscrmnl.edu.ph

- Location in Manila Location in Metro Manila Location in Luzon Location in the Philippines

San Sebastian College–Recoletos (SSC-R), commonly known by its nickname Bastê, is a private Catholic coeducational basic and higher education institution run by the Order of Augustinian Recollects in Manila, Metro Manila, Philippines. It is one of the six schools owned and operated by the Order of Augustinian Recollects in the Philippines. It was founded by the Augustinian Recollects in March 1941.

SSC-R, situated in the heart of Manila, in F. R. Hidalgo Street, Quiapo, was named after Roman centurion turned martyr Saint Sebastian. The College had a humble beginning. Its first functional lone building was an old convent: a two-storey Hispanic edifice made of stone and wood with capiz-shell windows. The building served as classrooms of the first batch of 200 elementary and high school enrollees. SSC-R was then an exclusive school for boys.

SSC-R was established in March 1941 but was in hiatus from 1942 to 1945 during World War II. It formally reopened after the war in 1947. The term Sebastinian, Filipino: Sebastino, refers to alumni and current students, teaching and non-teaching personnel as well as administrators of San Sebastian College-Recoletos.

The College was granted Level 3 accreditation by the Philippine Accrediting Association of Schools, Colleges and Universities or PAASCU in the Elementary department, High School Department and the College Department, including the Graduate Studies and College of Law.

San Sebastian College–Recoletos, Manila maintains the lone and highest slot in Tourism being accredited Level 3 by PAASCU, as well as its Social Sciences programs, Business Administration and Psychology courses.

== History ==
In the 1940s, the Order of Augustinian Recollects (OAR) envisioned the establishment of a Catholic School that performs a three-fold mission: the development of man, the promotion of local culture, and the welfare of society. SSC-R, Manila was established in 1941 but assumed hiatus from 1942 to 1945 when World War II broke out. It formally reopened after the war in 1946.

SSC-R, Manila, situated in the heart of Manila, was named after Roman centurion turned martyr – San Sebastian. The College had a relatively humble beginning. Its first functional lone building was an old convent: a two-storey Hispanic edifice made of stone and wood with capiz-shell windows. The building served as classrooms of the first batch of 200 elementary and high school enrollees. SSC-R, Manila was then an exclusive school for boys.

The first two-storey neo-gothic edifice modeled after the famous all-steel San Sebastian Church was built in 1947, replacing the first old stone and wood building.

== Academics ==
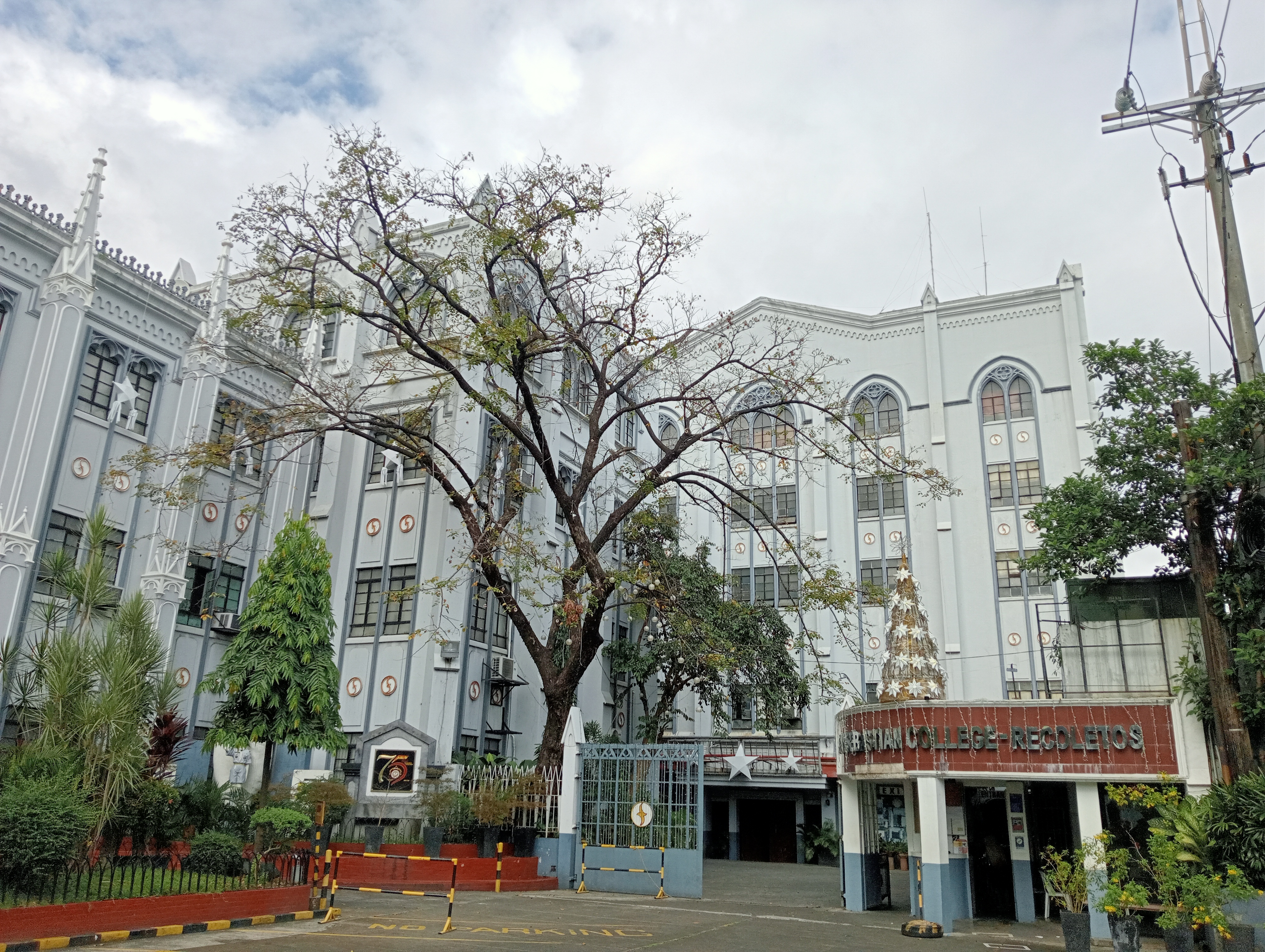
SSC-R campus

- Kindergarten
- Grade School
- Junior High School
- Senior High School STEM (Science, Technology, Engineering and Math) ABM (Accountancy, Business and Management) GAS (General Academic Strand) HUMMS (Humanities and Social Sciences)
- College BS Information Technology BS Computer Science BS Accountancy Borderless (Time-Free) BS Accountancy Business Administration majors in: Business Management, Marketing Management, Legal Management, Human Resource Development Management, Financial Management and Financial and Managerial Accounting, BS Supply Chain Management, BA Journalism, BA Broadcasting, BA Political Science, BS Psychology, BS Hospitality Management majors in: Hotel, Restaurant & Resort Management and Culinary Arts, BS Tourism Management
- Institute of Graduate Studies Masters in Business Administration with specialization in Fiscal Management & Public Administration, Human Capital Management & Labor Relations, Business & Industrial Economics, Corporate Finance, Tourism & Hospitality Management, Productivity & Quality Management, Marketing Marketing Masters of Arts in Theology Masters of Arts in Theological Studies Masters of Science Psychology (Thesis Track) Masters of Science (Non-Thesis Track) with specialization in: Industrial/Organizational and Counselling Ph.D. in Management with specialization in: International Hospitality Management, Political Economy & Governance, Business Anthropology and Human Capital Management & Labor Relations Ph.D. in Theology with specialization in: Dogma, Scriptures and Morals
- College of Law It offers a four-year Juris Doctor course (J.D) The Commission on Higher Education (CHED) gave full recognition to San Sebastian College-Recoletos, Manila as one of the top 20 law schools in the country.
- Masters of Law
- ETEEAP (Expanded Tertiary Education Equivalency and Accreditation Program) Business Administration majors in: Business Management, Marketing Management, Legal Management, Human Resource Development Management, Financial Management and Financial and Managerial Accounting BA Political Science BA Communication BS Psychology

== Scholarship Offers and Discounts ==
- Academic Scholarship
- Athletic Scholarship
- READS (Recoletos Educational Assistance for Deserving Students)
- Sibling Discount
- 5% Loyalty Discount
- 10% Academic Discount to students that has a grade of 85% and above in all subjects

== Del Carmen Gate ==
San Sebastian College–Recoletos has two separate gates namely the Recto Gate, which is situated at Recto Avenue, formerly Azcarraga Avenue and the (Plaza) Del Carmen Gate, in which the parking lot and the Minor Basilica of San Sebastian is located. This is also where the convent of the Order of Augustinian Recollects is situated.

Statues of Augustinian Recollect saints St. Ezekiel Moreno and St. Magdalene of Nagasaki are located near the convent.

During the 50th Founding Anniversary of San Sebastian College – Recoletos, the administration erected a statue of Pedro H. Gandia, Jr., a Sebastinian scout who, along with the rest of the Philippine contingent, died in a plane crash while on their way to attend the 11th World Scout Jamboree.

== Sebastinian Community Extension and Development Office (SCDEO) ==
San Sebastian College-Recoletos, Manila as a Catholic institution, is giving witness to the Augustinian Recollect charism as a way of living faith and Christianity through the Institutional Community Outreach/Extension Program, supervised by the Sebastinian Community Extension and Development Office (SCDEO).

== The Sebastinian identity ==
The San Sebastian Golden Stag

=== Golden Stag history ===
- The Golden Stags won 5 consecutive NCAA Seniors' Basketball Championships (achieved from 1993–1998). It is one of the longest championship streak in the NCAA under the leadership of Rommel Adducul
- San Sebastian Golden Stags won the Seniors' Basketball Championship Game twice in 2001-2002.
- In NCAA season 85, San Sebastian Golden Stags ended their 7-year title drought by claiming the Senior's Basketball Championship crown with rookie coach, Ato Agustin from host, University, which at that time, already had a 3peat championship in the NCAA and aimed to defy San Sebastian's dynasty streak.
- The other senior varsity teams may also be referred to as the Stags. The junior varsity teams are known as the San Sebastian Golden Staglets, while the women's teams are called the San Sebastian Lady Stags.
- In NCAA season 86, the San Sebastian Lady Stags bagged their 6-time Senior's Volleyball Championship Game with coach Roger Gorayeb.
- The staple cheer is Bravo Baste. The supporters of the San Sebastian Golden Stags are known as "bronx warriors".
- Their most prominent rivals in the league of athletics are Letran and San Beda.

== Student Publications ==
- The Sebastinian - The Official Student Publication of San Sebastian College - Recoletos, Manila
- Stagzette Production - The Official Student Publication of the Senior High School Department of San Sebastian College - Recoletos, Manila

== Gallery ==
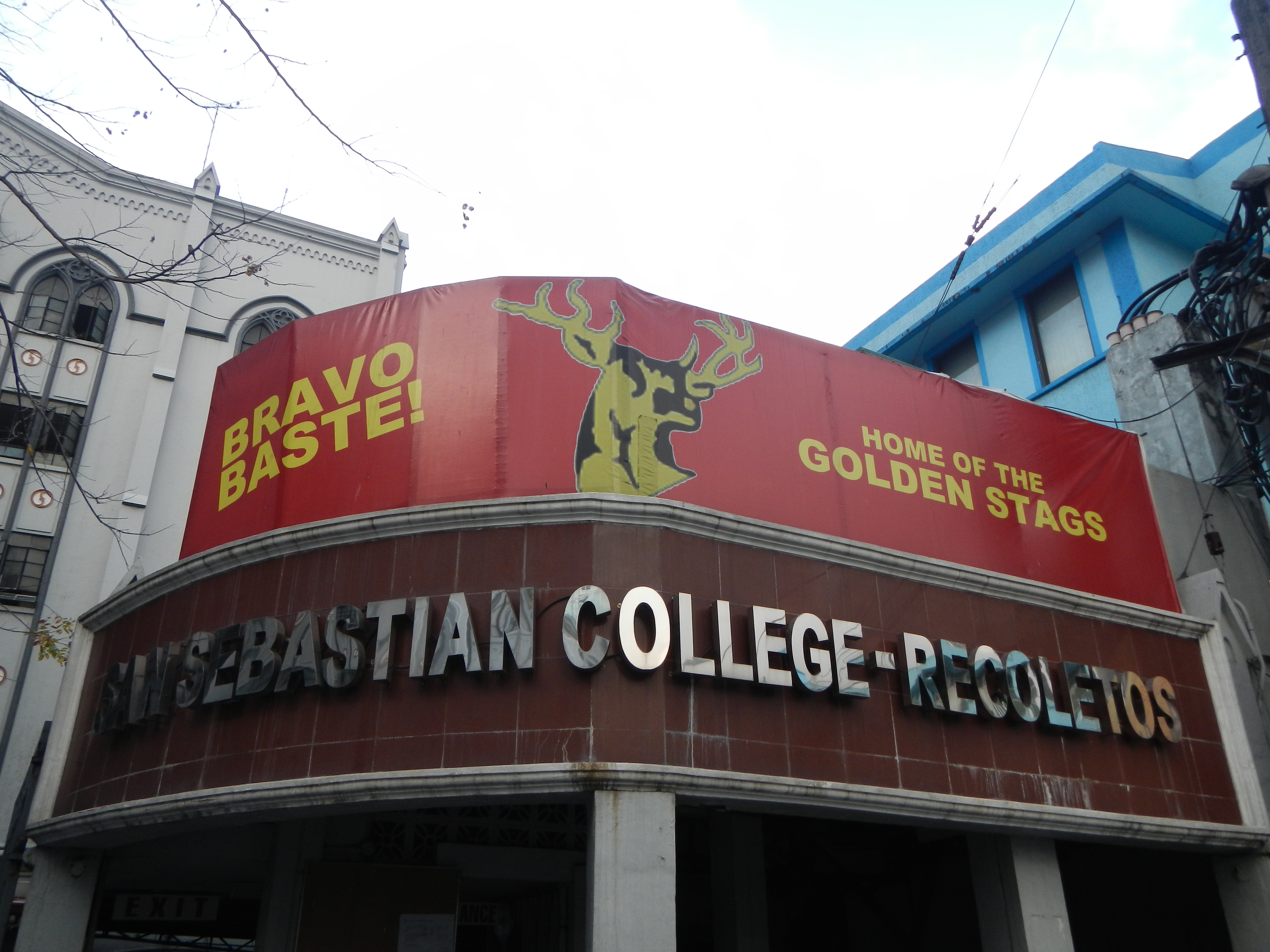
Entrance

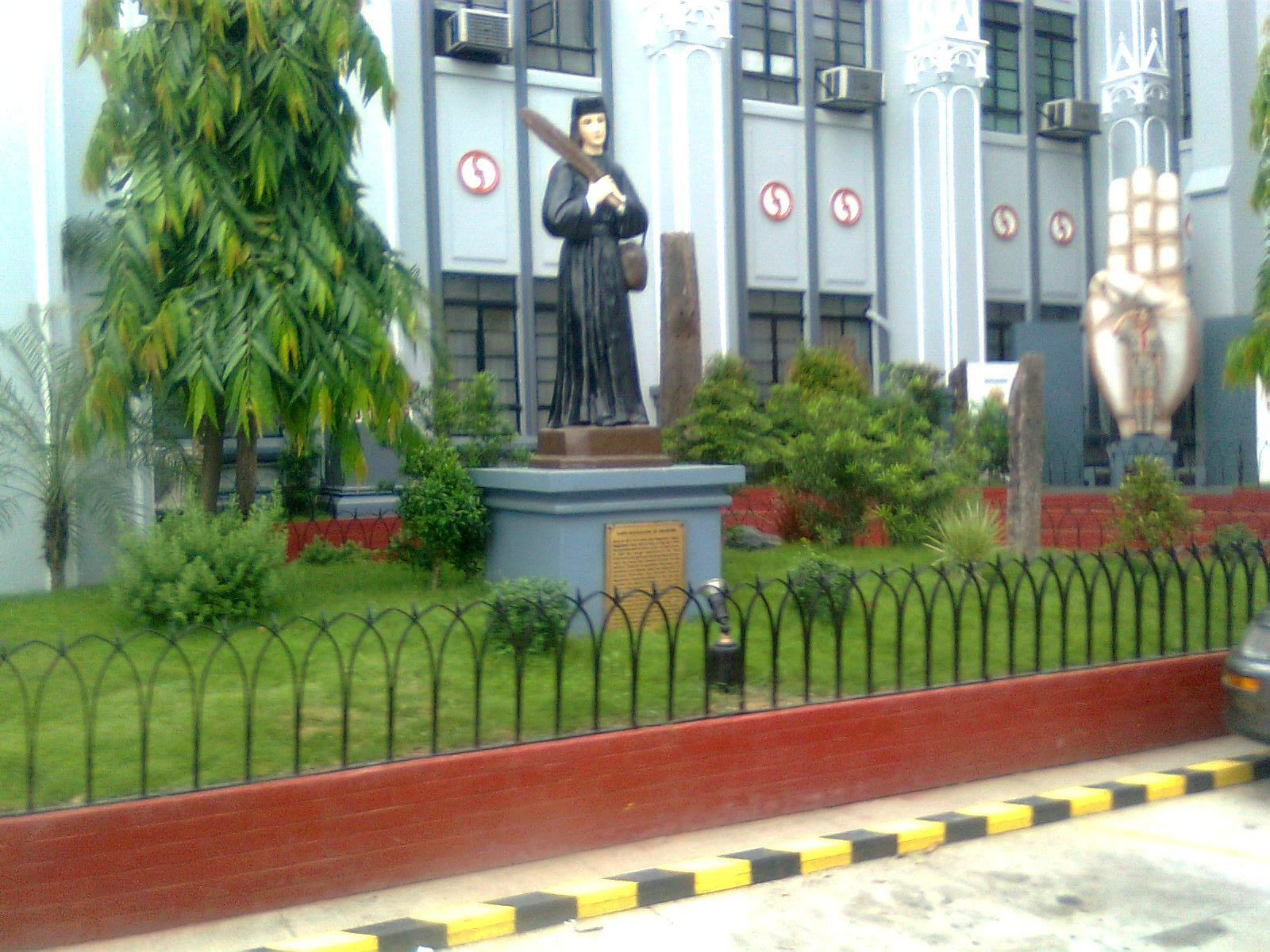
Statue of Saint Magdalene of Nagasaki

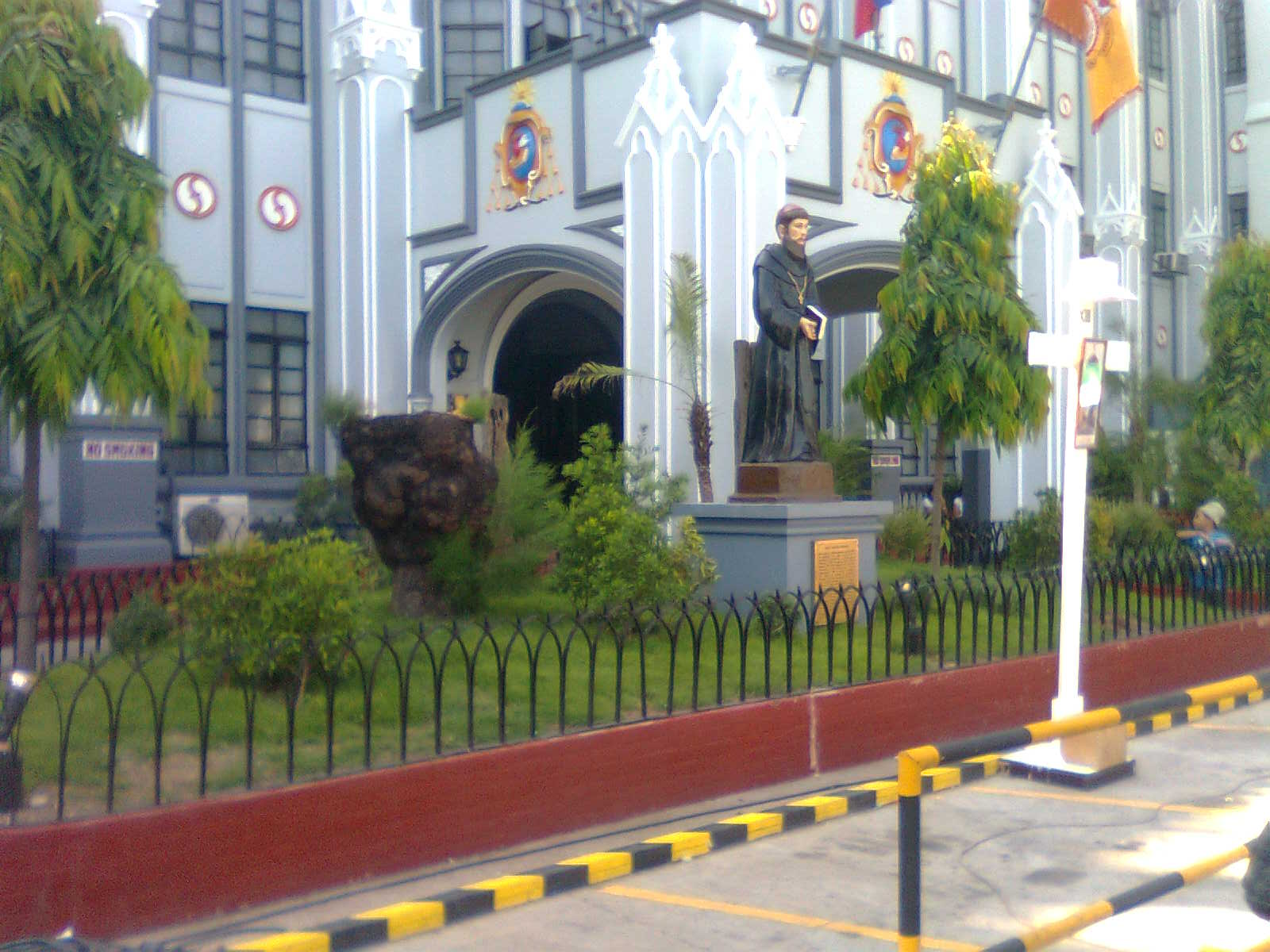
Statue of Saint Ezekiel Moreno

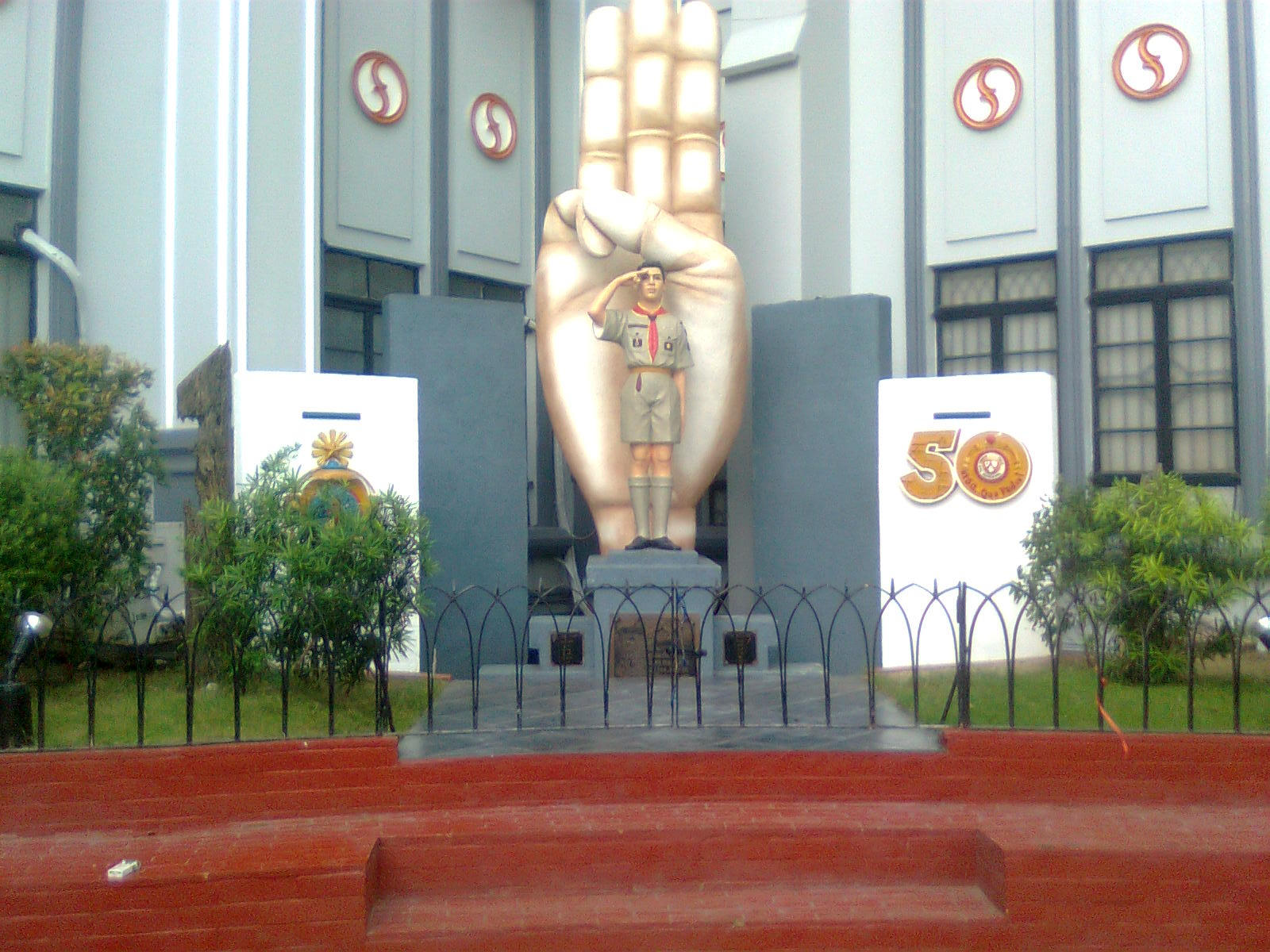
The statue of Pedro H. Gandia, Jr., a Sebastinian scout
