= Martin Lumbreras Peralta =

17th-century Catholic missionary

Blessed Martín Lumbreras y Peralta OAR
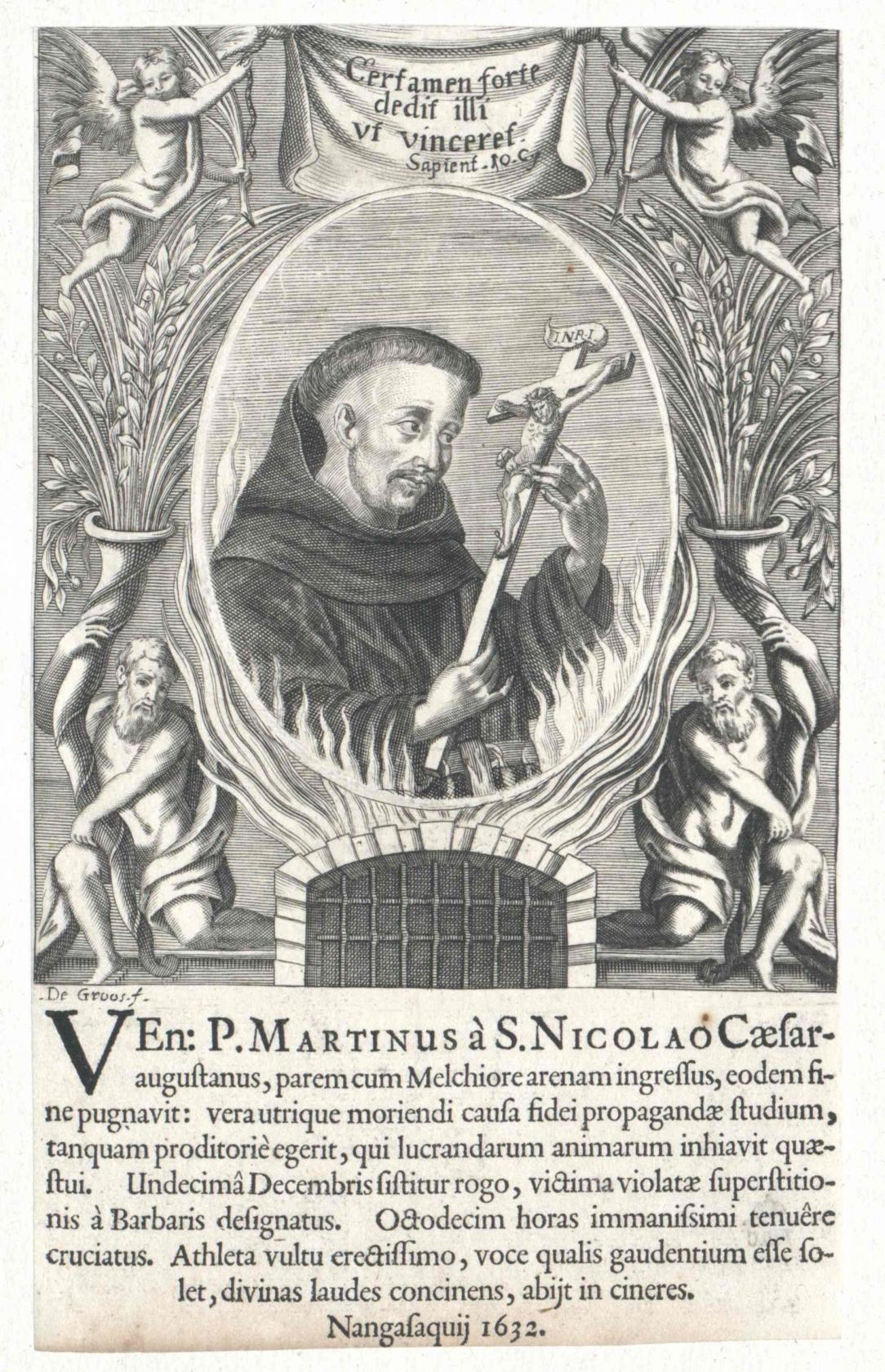
- Born: 10 November 1598; Zaragoza, Spain
- Died: 11 December 1632 (aged 34); Nagasaki, Japan
- Venerated in: Roman Catholic Church
- Beatified: 23 April 1989 by Pope John Paul II
- Feast: 11 December

Martín Lumbreras y Peralta, also known as Martín de San Nicolás (10 November 1598 – 11 December 1632), was a Roman Catholic missionary from Spain. He was beatified in April 1989 by Pope John Paul II.

== Early life ==
Martín Lumbreras y Peralta was born in Zaragoza, Spain, to a noble family, on 8 November 1598. He was baptized on 10 November 1598 in Pilar. He took the habit of an Augustinian Recollect in Borja, taking vows in Zaragoza in 1619. His name in religion was Juan de San Nicolás.

== Missionary ==
In July 1622, Peralta set sail from Cádiz to the Philippines, where he arrived in 1623. As a result of the persecution and the withdrawal of missionaries in Japan, his superiors assigned him to Manila, to serve as sacristan major and then as novice master. During his years in the Philippines, he greatly promoted the devotion of the Virgin of Pilar, to which he dedicated a picture and an altar in the Iglesia de San Nicolás de Tolentino de los Agustinos.

Peralta still had a strong desire to evangelize Japan. In a letter, dated 4 August 1631, he announced his desire for this apostolate to the vicar general, and exactly one year later, on 4 August 1632, he departed from Manila for Japan, in the company of Melchior de San Augustin, who would be his constant companion until his martyrdom. Both arrived in Nagasaki eight days later. Hostility had arisen between the Chinese traders, who gave them passage to Japan. One of these traders denounced their entry into Japan to the authorities in Nagasaki. Upon finding out of this betrayal, Peralta and Melchior fled into the mountains where they befriended Dominican priest Domenico Equicia. They were instructed in the Japanese language. Their anxiety soon pushed them down in a city where, discovered and recognized by government agents, they were arrested on 3 November 1632. Met with resistance, the government tried to make them renounce Christianity.

== Martyrdom ==
On 11 December 1632, these Augustinian priests were led to the site of their execution, through the method of hiaburi (punishment by burning at the stake). Melchior died four hours after the start of execution, while Peralta, to the amazement of the spectators, held out for eighteen hours.

The cause for Melchior's and Peralta's beatification was formally opened on 14 March 1928, granting them both the title of Servant of God. Their spiritual writings were approved by theologians on 1 February 1933. Peralta and Melchior were declared Venerable on 28 November 1988, and beatified on 23 April 1989 by Pope John Paul II and their feast day is celebrated on 11 December.
