= Order of Augustinian Recollects =

Mendicant Catholic religious order of friars and nuns

- Ordo Augustinianorum Recollectorum
- Abbreviation: OAR
- Formation: December 5, 1588; 437 years ago
- Founded at: Toledo, Spain
- Type: Mendicant Order of Pontifical Right (for Men)
- Headquarters: Viale dell'Astronomia, 27 Rome, Italy
- Members: 955 (includes 815 priests) (2022)
- Prior General: Miguel Angel Hernández Domínguez, OAR
- Vicar General: Javier González Velásquez, OAR
- Motto: Latin: Extende caritatem tuam (English: 'Extend your love')
- Parent organization: Catholic Church
- Website: recoletos.org

The Order of Augustinian Recollects (OAR) is a mendicant Catholic religious order of friars and nuns. It is a reformist offshoot from the Augustinian hermit friars and follows the same Rule of St. Augustine.

== History ==
The Recollects reflect a reform movement of the Augustinians begun in Spain in the 16th century. Thomas of Andrada was an Augustinian who belonged to one of the most illustrious houses of Portugal. He joined the Order of Saint Augustine at the age of fifteen. His efforts at reform met resistance, but after his death the regulations he had proposed were later adopted by those who formed the Discalced branch.

In 1561, Luis de León O.S.A., chair of theology at Salamanca undertook a revision of the constitutions of the order. In 1588 the first Augustinian community of the Spanish Regular Observance was established at Talavera. The reform emphasized fidelity to the Rule of St. Augustine. The reformers placed special emphasis on community prayer and simplicity of life. In 1592, Andrés Díaz introduced the reform congregation to Italy, first in Naples, then in Rome. As more houses were established, the Discalced members came to constitute a separate province of the Augustinian friars.

In 1606 Philip III of Spain sent some Discalced friars to the missions in the Philippines. In 1622 Pope Gregory XV authorized the erection of a separate congregation for the Recollect Augustinians, with its own vicar-general. The first Recollects reached Japan, by way of the Philippines in 1623. In 1626 a house was founded at Prague and in 1631 at Vienna.

In the 19th century, the Order was persecuted by Revolutionary governments in Spain and Colombia; so the sacking and pillaging of Recollect possessions continued; later the Communists destroyed many others. While many Recollect properties were destroyed, a few such as the Monastery of Monteagudo, Navarre, were spared.

The Recollects were formally recognized as a separate Mendicant Order in 1912, the last to be so designated.

== Global presence ==
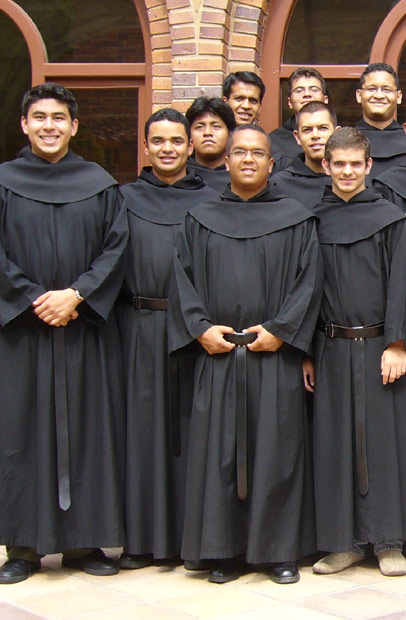
Augustinian Recollect novices at the Monasterio de Marcilla in Navarra, Spain

As of 2023, the Recollects numbered about 1,240 in eight provinces across nineteen countries; they are strongest in Spain, the Philippines and Colombia. The official languages of the Order are Spanish, English, and Portuguese.

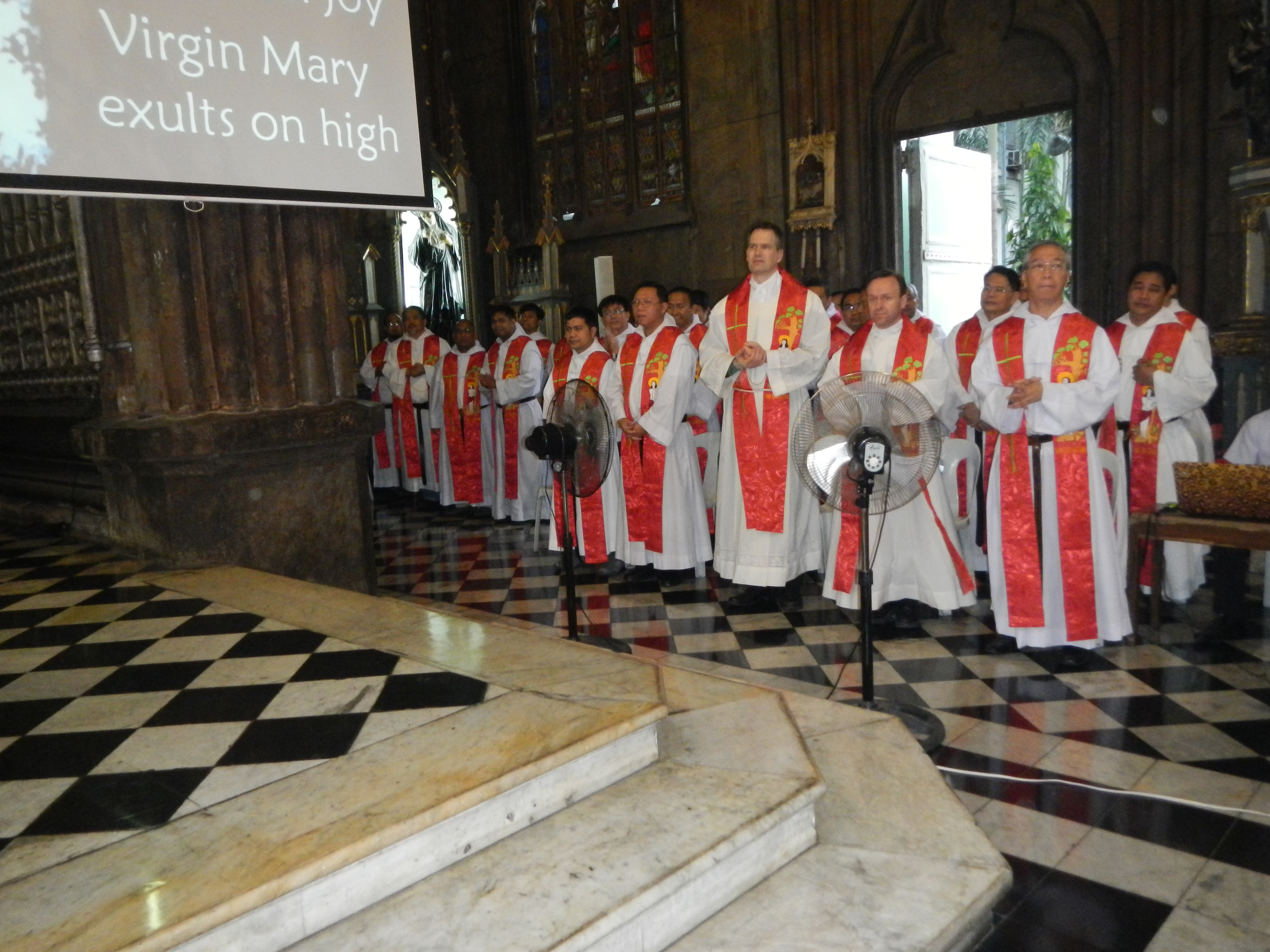
Augustinian Recollect priests celebrating Mass on the Feast of Saint Sebastian, Basílica Menor de San Sebastián, Manila, Philippines

=== Augustinian Recollects in the Philippines ===
With their arrival in May 1606 from Spain, the Recollects became one of the most important groups in the history of the evangelization of the Philippines. Many times, the areas given to this Order were the poorest islands in the archipelago, the ones not desired by other orders because of distance from the mainland.

Being a contemplative Order, it was not really their main goal to evangelize the country, but they became more active in the Philippines from 1606 to 1898, and later some missionaries spread the Recollect mission in Central America and in other parts of the world. Most of their houses were just formation centers, but they opened them to the public because the faithful would go and attend Sunday services with the friars.

Their first house was built in Bagumbayan, outside the walls of Manila. Later, they also built a house, San Nicolas de Tolentino Church, within the walls that became their house for the next hundreds of years after the British demolished all structures in Bagumbayan during their occupation of the city in the 1760s. The convent was destroyed during the World War II liberation of Manila. Instead of rebuilding, the Order moved to its present house, then San Sebastian Church, in Quiapo, Manila.

Their first parish was in Masinloc, Zambales. However, this has already been transferred to the management of the diocese. Other parishes that were given to them early in their ministry in the Philippines were those of Mabalacat in Pampanga, Capas and Bamban in Tarlac province.

The Order also had missions in Palawan, Calamianes and Caraga (in the northeastern part of Mindanao). They laid the foundation for Puerto Princesa City, the capital of Palawan. Mindoro and Bohol became part of their missions as well.

The province that was most heavily influenced by the Order is the island of Negros now divided into two provinces, Occidental and Oriental. Most of the towns in both provinces are named after towns where the missionaries came from in Spain, such as La Carlota, Valencia, and Cádiz. The Recollect friars form a significant segment of the clergy.

==== Role in Philippine nationalism ====
The Recollects had a pivotal role in causing and guiding the Philippine Revolution since when the Jesuits were suppressed (For their anti-colonial tendencies in the Jesuit missions among the Guaraní) they moved to the Jesuits' vacated parishes and gave their former parishes to the Filipino Secular/Diocesan Clergy giving Diocesan Clergy like the famous martyrs Gomburza who were militating under the issue of the Secularization movement in the Philippines, their own parishes, before the return of the Jesuits forced them to retake their parishes from the Diocesan Clergy.

The opposition of the other religious orders against an autonomous diocesan clergy independent of them (With the possible exception of the Recollects and Jesuits) lead to the martyrdom of Filipino Diocesan priests Mariano Gomez, José Burgos, Jacinto Zamora collectively known as Gomburza who were wrongly implicated in the Cavite Mutiny, since the Spanish feared that because a priest, Rev. Fr. Miguel Hidalgo lead the Mexican war of independence against Spain, the same would happen in the Philippines. Furthermore, the Governor General who was a Freemason, Rafael Izquierdo y Gutiérrez upon discovering the Cavite Mutiny was led by fellow Freemasons: Maximo Innocencio, Crisanto de los Reyes, and Enrique Paraiso; the Governor-General as per his Masonic vow to protect fellow brothers of the Craft, shifted the blame to Gomburza since they had inspired ethnic pride among Filipinos due to their campaign for reform. The Governor-General asked the Catholic hierarchy in the person of Archbishop of Manila Gregorio Meliton Martinez (the same Archbishop who ordained the Recollect Saint, Ezequiél Moreno y Díaz) to have them declared as heretics and defrocked but he refused as he believed in Gomburza's innocence. As the Imperial government executed Gomburza, churches all across the territory were rung in mourning. This inspired the Jesuit educated and future National Hero Jose Rizal to form the La Liga Filipina, to ask for reforms from Spain and recognition of local clergy.

Rizal was executed and the La Liga Filipina dissolved. As cries for reform were ignored, formerly loyal Filipinos were radicalized and the 1896 Philippine revolution was triggered when the Spanish discovered the anti-colonial secret organisation Katipunan (formed with Masonic rites in mind, and Freemasonry is traditionally Anti-Catholic, yet the Katipunan were dedicated to the martyred priests Gomburza as Gomburza was a password in the Katipunan), the Katipunan waged the revolution leading to the end of Spanish rule. However, there was conflict between Filipino Masons in the Katipunan and American Masons as a result of the Philippine-American War, wherein the American Masonic lodges considered the Filipino Masonic lodges "irregular" and illegitimate. During the American era of the Philippines, the Augustinian Recollects were large shareholders in San Miguel Corporation.

Since the creation of the Province of Saint Ezekiél Moreno on November 28, 1998, the Philippine Province was officially separated from the Province of San Nicolas de Tolentino. Now, the Philippine Province supervises not only the different missions in the Philippines but also in Sierra Leone, Indonesia, Vietnam, Saipan and Taiwan.

==== OAR learning institutions ====
The Order administers two universities: the University of Negros Occidental-Recoletos in Bacolod founded in 1941 and acquired by the order in 1962 and University of San Jose - Recoletos in Cebu City founded in 1947. They also administer two colleges - the San Sebastian College - Recoletos in Manila, its pioneer institution, established in 1941 (later, added an extension campus in Canlubang in 2006) and the San Sebastian College - Recoletos de Cavite in Cavite City that was founded in 1966. They also manage four secondary schools namely Colegio de Santo Tomas-Recoletos in San Carlos City, Colegio San Nicolas de Tolentino - Recoletos in Talisay City both in Negros Occidental; and the Colegio de San Pedro-Recoletos at Brgy. Poblacion and San Pedro Academy at Brgy. Caidiocan in Valencia, Negros Oriental.

In 2023, the University of San Jose- Recoletos unveiled a historical marker given by the National Historical Commission of the Philippines (NHCP), which recognizes the contributions of OAR in the Philippines.

=== Augustinian Recollects in Taiwan ===
The Recollect foundation in Taiwan is based at Kaohsiung City. They are supported by Filipino Recollects from the Province of St. Ezekiel Moreno.

== Nuns ==
Alonso de Orozco Mena, court preacher, was instrumental in the founding of the first Recollect convent, that of the Visitation, in Madrid, in 1589. Juan de Ribera, Archbishop of Valencia (d. 1611), founded a second Discalced Augustinian congregation at Alcoy, in 1597. It soon had houses in different parts of Spain, and in 1663 was established at Lisbon by Queen Louise of Portugal. In addition to the Rule of St. Augustine these religious observed the exercises of the Reformed Carmelites of St. Teresa.

In the convent at Cybar, Mariana Manzanedo of St. Joseph instituted a reform which led to the establishment of a third group, that of the female Augustinian Recollects. The statutes, drawn up by Father Antinólez, and later confirmed by Paul V, bound the sisters to the strictest interpretation of the rules of poverty and obedience, and a rigorous penitential discipline.

== Secular Augustinian Recollects ==
The Third Order of the Recollects of St. Augustine was set up to involve lay men and women. They publicly declare promises to seek to follow the teachings of St. Augustine. Modern changes in the Catholic Church have led to an increased emphasis on the laity in the work of the Church. As part of the Order, they now share in the work of the friars, and have been reorganized as the Secular Augustinian Recollects.

The Secular Augustinian Recollects (together composed a body called the Secular Augustinian Recollect Fraternity or SARF) is the Third Order of the Order of Augustinian Recollects. Being a full member of the OAR Family, they share in the charism of the Order and in turn share in the graces bestowed upon the First Order and the Second Order.

Today, the SARF is present in 15 countries, divided into 111 local chapters and totals about 3500 members. like the Recollect priests and nuns, full-fledged members of the Third Order attach the SAR to their names.

=== History ===
Like the Third Order of the Augustinians, the Secular Augustinian Recollects trace back its history in the Middle Ages. On 5 December 1588, a number of religious of the Augustinian Province of Castile, moved by a special collective charism, expressed with renewed fervour, and according to new norms, their desire to live the type of consecrated life which Saint Augustine established in the Church, illustrated by his doctrine and examples and ordered in his Holy Rule. Hence, the Augustinian Recollection came to be.

The first groups of tertiaries were recorded in the convents of Madrid, Alcalá, Nava del Rey. In Granada, there were known to exist two or three groups of mantelatas (Spanish members of the Third Order) between 1655 and 1676.

== Saints, Blesseds, and other holy people ==
Saints

- Magdalene of Nagasaki (c. 1611 - 15 October 1634), Lay Recollect and also a member of the Third Order of Saint Dominic, martyr of Japan, canonized on 18 October 1987
- Ezequiél Moreno y Díaz (9 April 1848 - 19 August 1906), Bishop of Pasto, canonized on 11 October 1992

Blesseds

- Peter Kuhyōe of the Mother of God (c. 1599 – 28 October 1630), professed religious and martyr of Japan, beatified on 7 May 1867
- Mancius Kizaemon (Augustine of Jesus Mary) (c. 1606 – 28 October 1630), professed religious and martyr of Japan, beatified on 7 May 1867
- Lawrence Hachizō of Saint Nicholas (c. 1601 – 28 October 1630), professed religious and martyr of Japan, beatified on 7 May 1867
- John Matsutake Shōzaburō (c. 1613 – 28 October 1630), Lay Recollect and martyr of Japan, beatified on 7 May 1867
- Michael Kiuchi Tazaemon (c. 1593 – 28 October 1630), Lay Recollect and martyr of Japan, beatified on 7 May 1867
- Thomas Terai Kahei (c. 1605 – 28 October 1630), Lay Recollect and martyr of Japan, beatified on 7 May 1867
- Vicente Simões de Carvalho of Saint Anthony (c. 1590 – 3 September 1632), professed religious and martyr of Japan, beatified on 7 May 1867
- Francisco of Jesus Terrero de Ortega Pérez (c. May 1590 – 3 September 1632), professed religious and martyr of Japan, beatified on 7 May 1867
- Martín of Saint Nicholas Lumbreras Peralta (8 December 1598 – 11 December 1632), priest and martyr of Japan, beatified on 23 April 1989
- Melchor of Saint Augustine Sánchez Pérez (c. 1599 – 11 December 1632), priest and martyr of Japan, beatified on 23 April 1989
- Vicente Soler Munárriz of Saint Aloysius Gonzaga and 6 Companions (died 1936), Martyrs of the Spanish Civil War, beatified on 7 March 1999
- Laura Evangelista Alvarado Cardozo (25 April 1875 - 2 April 1967), foundress, Augustinian Recollect Sisters of the Heart of Jesus, beatified on 7 May 1995

Venerables

- Mariana of Saint Joseph de Manzanedo Herrera (5 August 1568 - 15 April 1638), founder of the Augustinian Recollect Nuns, declared Venerable on 18 December 2017
- Basilia Cornago Zapater (Monica of Jesus) (17 May 1889 - 14 April 1964), professed religious, declared Venerable on 13 June 1992
- Salustiana Antonia Ayerbe Castillo (María Esperanza of the Cross) (8 June 1890 - 23 May 1967), founder of the Augustinian Recollect Missionary Sisters, declared Venerable on 14 December 2015
- Mariano Gazpio Ezcurra (18 December 1899 - 22 September 1989), priest, declared Venerable on 22 May 2021
- Alphonse Gallegos (20 February 1931 – 6 October 1991), Auxiliary Bishop of Sacramento, declared Venerable on 8 July 2016

Servants of God

- Isabel of Jesus Sánchez Ximénez (c. 1586 - 9 June 1648), widow and professed religious, declared Servant of God in 2013
- Isabel of the Mother of God García Ximénez (6 June 1614 - 19 January 1687), nun, declared Servant of God on 19 September 2007
- Antonia of Jesus López Jiménez (24 July 1612 - 16 June 1695), professed religious of Augustinian Recollect Nuns, declared Servant of God on 7 July 2000
- Cecilia Rosa de Jesus Talangpaz (16 July 1693 - 31 July 1731), Filipina cofounder of the Augustinian Recollect Sisters, declared Servant of God on 10 September 1999
- Dionisia de Santa Maria Mitas Talangpaz (12 March 1691 - 12 October 1732), Filipina cofounder of the Augustinian Recollect Sisters, declared Servant of God on 10 September 1999
- Simi Cohen Leví (María Dolores of the Love of God) (4 April 1801 - 8 January 1887), professed religious, declared Servant of God on 20 December 2000
- Nicomedes of Saint Augustine Mateo de Gracia (15 September 1895 - 10 August 1936), Martyr of the Spanish Civil War
- María del Pilar (Presentación) Casanova Ferrer (6 June 1881 - 11 November 1936), nun, Martyr of the Spanish Civil War, declared Servant of God on 8 May 2008
- María Teresa (Purificación) Llopis Gurrea (29 May 1861 - 17 July 1937), nun, Martyr of the Spanish Civil War, declared Servant of God on 8 May 2008
- Ignacio of the Blessed Sacrament Martínez Madrid (31 December 1902 - 16 March 1942), apostolic administrator of Lábrea, declared Servant of God on 18 September 1999
- Jenaro of the Sacred Heart of Jesus Fernández Echeverría (19 January 1909 - 3 July 1972), priest, declared Servant of God on 27 November 2007

== Notable members ==
- Abraham a Sancta Clara
- José Luis Lacunza Maestrojuán - first Recollect elevated to cardinal

== See also ==
- The Augustinian Recollect Province of Saint Ezequiél Moreno
- Chapter of Toledo
