= Laura Evangelista Alvarado Cardozo =

Venezuelan religious

Blessed Laura Evangelista Alvarado Cardozo
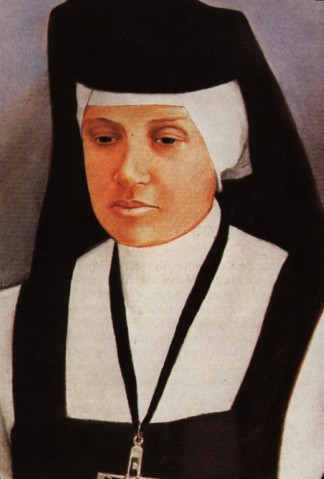

Virgin
- Born: 25 April 1875; Choroní, Aragua, Venezuela
- Died: 2 April 1967 (aged 91); Maracay, Aragua, Venezuela
- Venerated in: Roman Catholic Church
- Beatified: 7 May 1995, Saint Peter's Square by Pope John Paul II
- Feast: 2 April
- Attributes: Augustinian habit

Laura Evangelista Alvarado Cardozo (25 April 1875 - 2 April 1967) was a Venezuelan religious sister who had established the Augustinian Recollect Sisters of the Heart of Jesus as a means of aiding the ill. Upon her profession she assumed the religious name María de San José. During her life she was contemporaries with José Gregorio Hernández. She was beatified in 1995.

== Life ==
Laura Evangelista Alvarado Cardozo was born on 25 April 1875 as the eldest of four children to Clemente Alvarado (d. 1890) and Margarita Cardozo; her brothers were Octaviano, Panchita and Clemencia. She received Confirmation at the age of two in 1877 from the Archbishop of Caracas José Antonio Ponte. She was baptized on 13 October 1875 and received it from Father Jose Maria Yepez while her godparents were Manuel González and Dolores Bravo Sofia Cardozo - a cousin of hers.

She commenced her studies in her hometown but was forced to complete it in Maracay when she moved with her parents and siblings. She commenced her studies at the age of five and completed them in September 1892 at the age of seventeen. It was around this time that she felt called to the religious life and confided this to her spiritual director Father Vicente Lopez Aveledo. It was on 8 December 1892 that she made a vow to God to remain a perpetual virgin in his service. At the age of thirteen on 8 December 1888 she received her First Communion and focused on preparing children for the same sacrament from that point until she was eighteen. In 1893 she Father Aveledo's new order devoted to the Blessed Mother. Around that time in 1893 she made a personal resolution: "I want to be a saint, but a real saint ... my Jesus, You and only You are the goal of all my striving".

On 3 November 1893 she began to work in a small hospital and assisted patients that suffered from smallpox. She also volunteered in other hospitals. From 1897 until 1898 she worked as a volunteer in the hospital of San José. Her father died aged 55 of a brain condition in 1890. An earthquake that struck the nation in October 1900 led to her tending to homeless people and those that the disaster impacted. On 11 February 1901 she had the permission of the Archbishop of Caracas Críspulo Uzcátegui to found a congregation of religious based on the Order of Saint Augustine and devoted to the care of the ill. With three companions she assumed the new habit and commenced her period of novitiate; she was made the Superior of her order and held that position until her resignation in 1960. On 22 January 1902 she made her solemn profession of her vows and assumed the new name of "María de San José".

On 28 September 1903 the statutes of her order received approval and received recognition on 17 September 1927 as being an order of diocesan right and was under the name of the Augustinian Hospitaller Sisters; this name changed to its present name at some future point. At her request - on 10 May 1950 - the congregation was added to the Order of Augustinian Recollects and it received the papal approval of Pope Pius XII on 15 November 1952.

Laura Evangelista was diagnosed with bronchopneumonia on 2 June 1966 which contributed to her decline in health. Her situation improved around Easter of 1967 though started to decline not long after. Cardozo died of thrombosis on 2 April 1967 at 12 pm. Her remains were deemed to be incorrupt after their exhumation on 19 January 1994 at 9 am; her remains were placed in a new sarcophagus in September 1994.

== Beatification ==
The beatification process commenced on 10 June 1983 once formal approval - or "nihil obstat" (nothing against) - had been granted to the cause. It resulted in the introduction of a diocesan process on 9 October 1983 tasked with compiling evidence attesting to her potential sainthood while also collating documentation pertaining to her life. The process concluded on 13 June 1986 and received the formal ratification of the Congregation for the Causes of Saints on 13 November 1987. This decree affirmed the diocesan process completed its work according to the current standards and would allow for the so-called "Roman Phase" to begin in which the C.C.S. would commence their own investigation into the cause.

The postulation compiled the Positio and submitted it to the C.C.S. in 1990 for their evaluation. It led to Pope John Paul II declaring her to be Venerable on 7 March 1992 after acknowledging that she had lived a life of heroic virtue.

The miracle needed for her beatification was investigated in its diocese of origin and the process was ratified on 3 April 1992 - it involved the cure of Sister Teresa Silva. John Paul II approved the healing as a credible miracle on 23 December 1993 and beatified her on 7 May 1995.
