= Cecilia Rosa de Jesús Talangpaz =

Servant of God Cecilia Rosa de Jesús AR
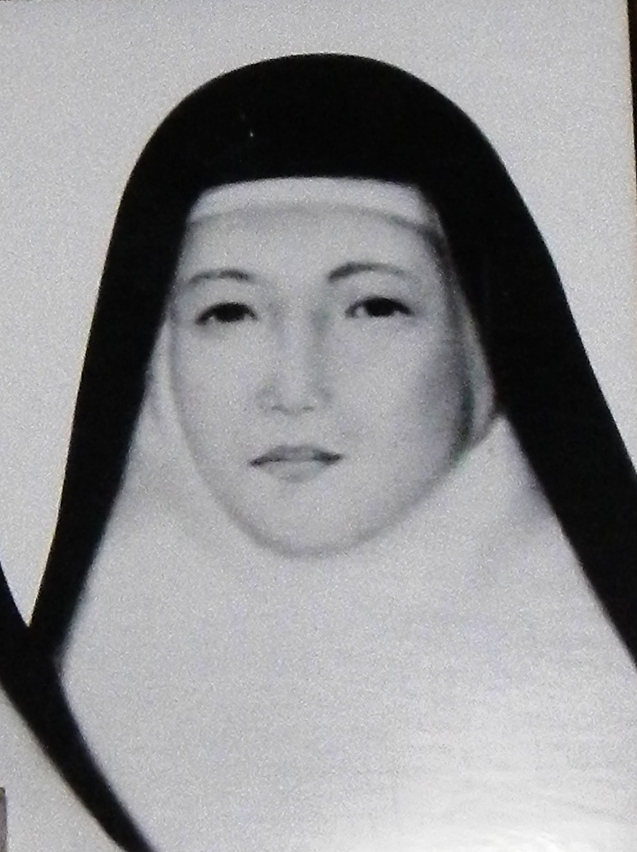
- Born: Cecilia Rosa de Jesús Talangpaz y Pamintuan; July 16, 1693; Calumpit, Bulacan
- Died: July 31, 1731 (aged 38); San Sebastian, Manila

Cecilia Talangpaz (1693 – 1731) was a Kapampangan Filipino religious sister. Along with her sister Dionisia de Santa María Mitas Talangpaz, she established the Beaterio de San Sebastian de Calumpang (now the Congregation of the Augustinian Recollect Sisters), in 1719. The Augustinian Recollect Sisters is the second Filipino congregation of women religious founded in the Philippines, after the Religious of the Virgin Mary established by Ignacia del Espíritu Santo. Talangpaz' beatification process has been opened.

== Religious life ==
Cecilia was born on July 16, 1693, in Calumpit, Bulacan to half-Kapampangan parents. Together with her older sister Dionisia, they settled down near the shrine of the Our Lady of Mount Carmel in Manila. Their devout life attracted the attention of the Recollects who were taking care of the shrine and by July 1725, the sisters received the habit of tertiaries and were gathered in a nunnery.

=== San Sebastian Convent ===
The Talangpaz sisters went on to found the Beaterio de San Sebastian de Calumpang. After years, they headed a congregation called Augustinian Recollect Sisters.

== Death ==
Cecilia died in 1731, followed by her sister Dionisia in 1732. On September 10, 1999, the causes for the beatification of the Talangpaz sisters were opened, bestowed with Nulla Osta and thereby giving them the title Servants of God.

== See also ==
- List of Filipinos venerated in the Catholic Church
