= Monteagudo, Navarre =

Municipality in Navarre, Spain

Coordinates: 41.964°N 1.690°W

Monteagudo is a town and municipality located in the province of Navarre, Spain. According to the 2006 census (INE), the municipality has a population of 1,146 inhabitants.

The town has an Augustinian Recollect monastery.
