= Ezequiél Moreno y Díaz =

Spanish Catholic friar (1848–1906)

Saint Ezequiél Moreno y Díaz OAR
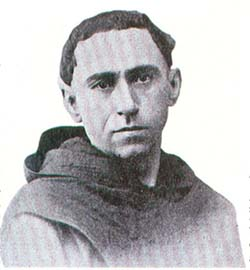

Bishop of Pasto
- Born: 9 April 1848; Alfaro, La Rioja, Spain
- Died: 19 August 1906 (aged 58); Montegudo, Navarre, Spain
- Venerated in: Catholic Church
- Beatified: 1 November 1975 by Pope Paul VI
- Canonized: 11 October 1992, Santo Domingo, Dominican Republic by Pope John Paul II
- Feast: 19 August
- Patronage: Cancer, Sto. Niño De Molino Parish Church - Bacoor, Immaculate Conception Cathedral Parish - Puerto Princesa Palawan, Recoletos Community

Ezequiél Moreno y Díaz OAR was a Spanish Catholic prelate who served as Bishop of Pasto from 1895 to 1906. He was a member of the Order of Augustinian Recollects and previously served as a missionary to the Philippines and as Vicar Apostolic of Casanare in Colombia.

Moreno was canonized in 1992 and is popularly invoked as the patron saint of cancer patients.

== Early life and entry to the Order of Augustinian Recollects ==
Born April 9, 1848 in the city of Alfaro, La Rioja, Spain to Félix Moreno and María Josefa Díaz, he was the third of six children. His father was a tailor. His nephew Julián Moreno is venerated as a Blessed because of his martyrdom in Motril. Ezequiel served as an altar boy for the Dominican nuns and developed a devotion to Our Lady of the Rosary.

Following the example of his older brother, Moreno entered the Recoletos in Monteagudo, Navarre, Spain on September 21, 1864 taking the name Fray Ezequiel Moreno de la Virgen del Rosario. Later, he made his solemn vow in Marcialla (also in Navarra) on September 22, 1865.

== Philippine missions ==
=== Arrival and ordination in Manila ===
The monastery in Monteagudo was known for dispatching missionaries to both the Americas and the Philippines. On October 14, 1869 he embarked from Cádiz arriving in Manila on February 10, 1870.

In the middle that year, Moreno sailed on to the Visayan town of Jaro, Iloilo where he received and finished his minor orders. A year later, he returned to Manila to receive his sacerdotal orders from the Archbishop of Manila, Gregorio Melitón Martínez (The same prelate who defended the martyred priests Gomburza by siding with them over the Spanish Governor-General). He was ordained a priest on June 3, 1871. Today, the letter of the archbishop informing him of his sacerdotal ordination is one of the best-preserved manuscripts from the period. After ordination, he was immediately sent to his first mission in Calapan, Oriental Mindoro. There, he became proficient in Tagalog that at his canonisation, Filipino Catholics remarked that the language is now "a language of the saints."

=== Provincial assignments ===
About two years after his arrival in the colony, he was sent, along with his brother Eustaquio, to the island of Palawan, where he undertook the task of being Military Chaplain to a penal colony, now Iwahig Prison and Penal Farm, in Puerto Princesa City. He was among the founders of the town of Aborlan, Palawan and Barangay Inagawan in Puerto Princesa. Moreno was struck by malaria, which forced him to return to Manila.

When he recovered from the disease, he was put in charge of a mission in Calapan. Though only 28 years old, both the Archbishop of Manila and his Recollect Prior assigned him as Vicar Forane of Mindoro.

=== Return to Manila and surrounding areas ===
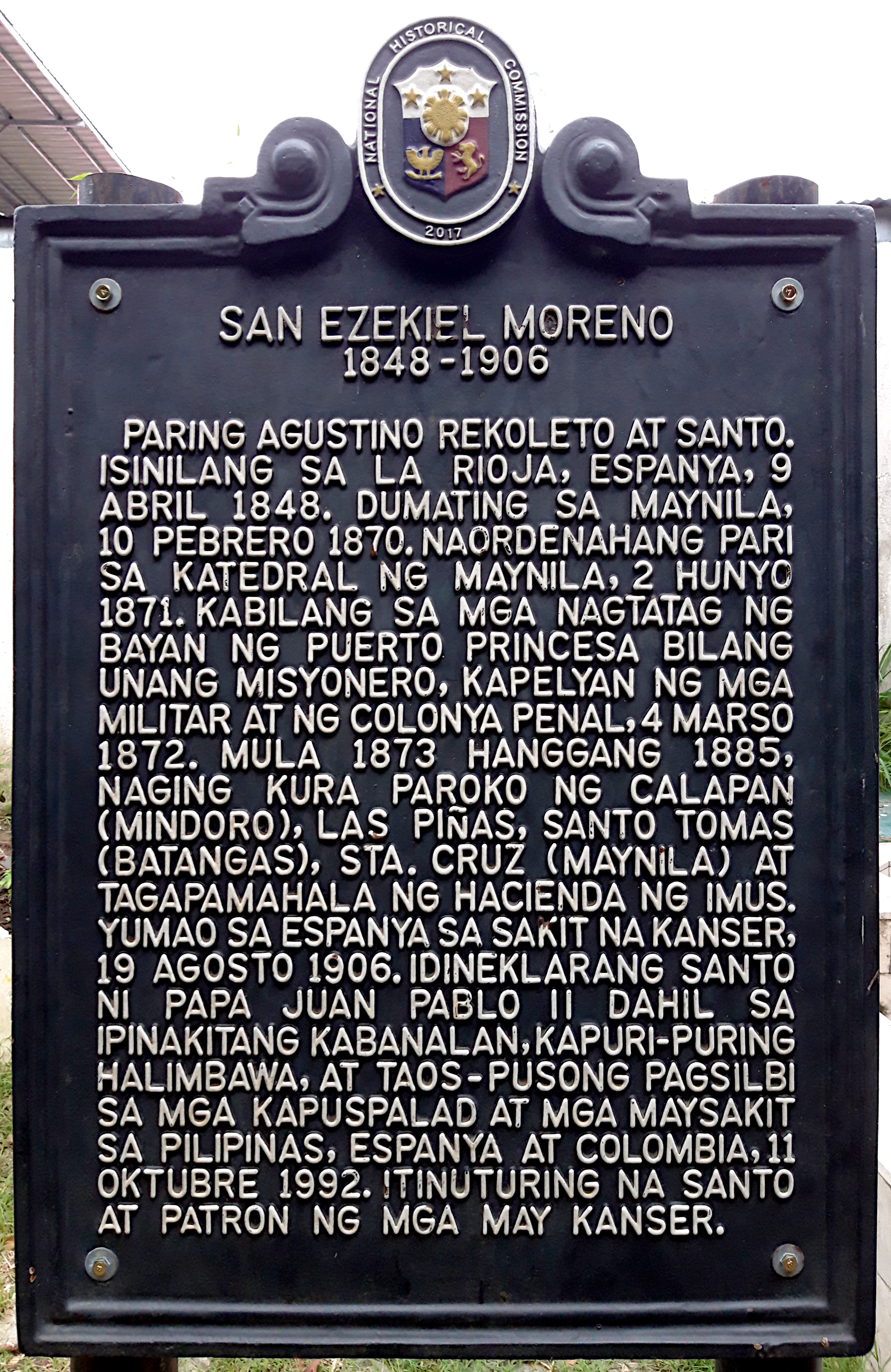
Historical marker installed in Bacoor

In May 1876, he was transferred to what is now Las Piñas and worked zealously for the development of the lives of the people in the area. During the three years that Ezequiel Moreno remained in this mission, he went through an epidemic, a drought and a fire, to which he responded with care to the sick and helping those left in extreme poverty with money, rice and clothing. This saintly way of life that he exemplified caused the people of Las Piñas to oppose his transfer to Santo Tomás, Batangas.

The appeal, as strong as it was, was not successful and Moreno was transferred to Santo Tomás. However, he was recalled to Manila because he was appointed General Preacher of the Order of Augustinian Recollects. The people of Santo Tomas also made an appeal to suspend the order but just as in Las Piñas, their request was not granted. He assumed the post in October 1880 and as Preacher General, was assigned parish priest of Santa Cruz Church, assuming the post in February 1881.

A year later, he was assigned to take charge of the Recollect hacienda in the towns of Imus and Bacoor in Cavite. During his stay, the towns were struck by cholera and the priest worked hard to administer the Last Rites to as many of the faithful as possible that of the 3,200 victims, only three died without receiving the Last Rites.

He was elected Superior of the Seminary in Monteagudo, Navarra, Spain, in 1885.

== Colombian missions ==
It was in 1888 that he once more crossed the Atlantic Ocean and became the head of the Recollect mission in Colombia. He served as Vicar apostolic of Casanare and was named bishop of Pinara, Colombia on October 23, 1893. He became Bishop of Pasto, Colombia on December 2, 1893. He was noted for his generous charity to the faithful of his diocese and encouraged the practice of the Rosary of the Dawn.

=== Involvement in Colombian politics ===
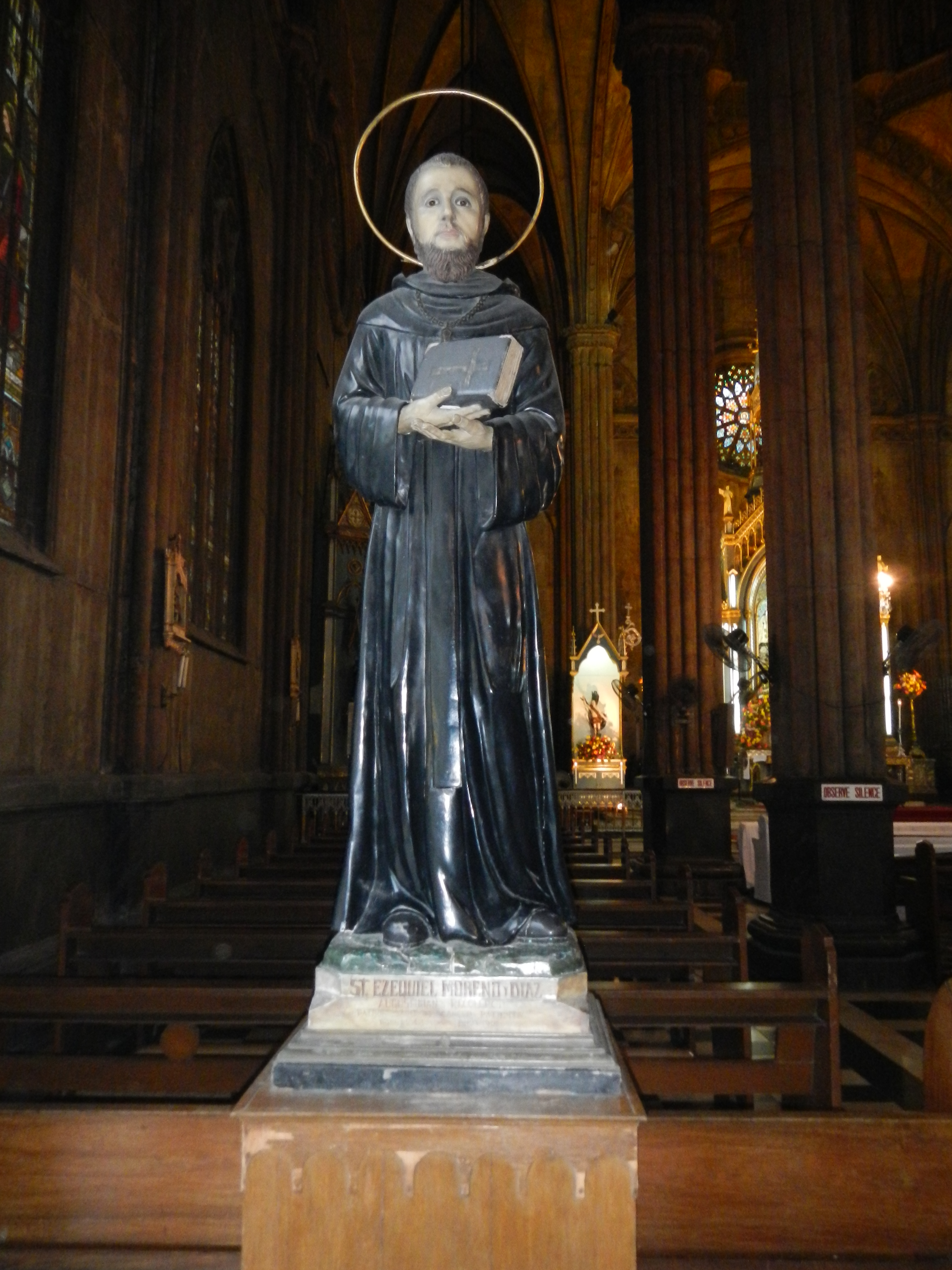
Devotional statue of St. Ezequiel Moreno at the Basilica Minore de San Sebastian, Manila.

As most of the Colombian Church hierarchy, Ezequiel Moreno aligned himself with the Colombian Conservative Party. During the Thousand Days War, he used his writings and preaching sermons to attack the Colombian Liberal Party. He expressed in his pastoral letters, the defense of what he believed in, with the purpose of making clear the commitments of a Catholic, above political affiliations. His statement, “liberalism is a sin,” may have been the most controversial.

== Bibliography ==
- Rafael Lazcano, Episcopologio agustiniano. Agustiniana, Guadarrama (Madrid), 2014, vol. II, 2024–2063. [Life, works, studies, iconography and wegraphy).
