= Dionisia Talangpaz =

Servant of God Dionisia de Santa María Mitas AR
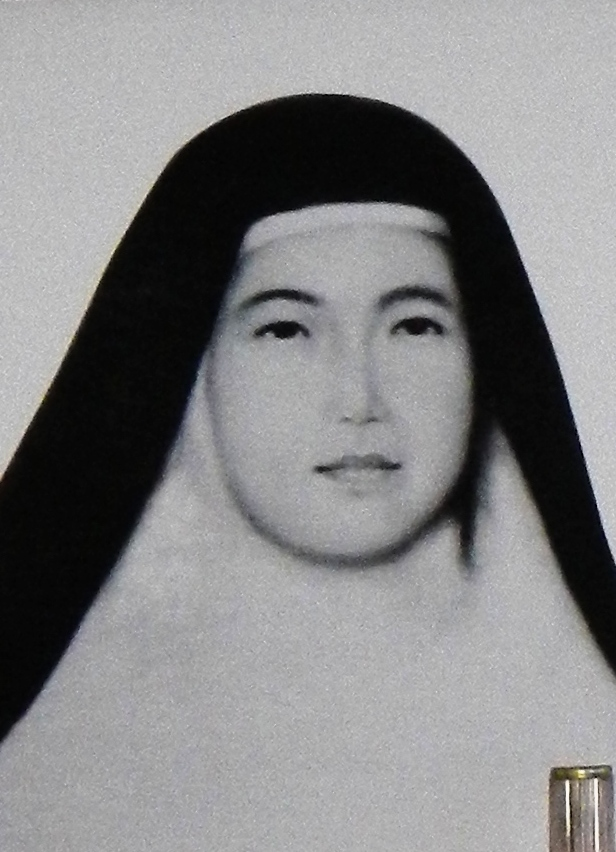
- Born: Dionisia de Santa María Mitas Talangpaz y Pamintuan; March 12, 1691; Calumpit, Bulacan, Captaincy General of the Philippines
- Died: October 12, 1732 (aged 41); San Sebastian, Manila, Captaincy General of the Philippines

Dionisia Talangpaz (1691–1732), was a Filipino religious sister. Along with her biological sister Cecilia Rosa de Jesús Talangpaz, she founded the Beaterio de San Sebastián de Calumpang (now the Congregation of the Augustinian Recollect Sisters), in 1719. The Augustinian Recollect Sisters is the second-oldest native Filipino congregation for women religious founded in the Philippines.

== Beaterio de San Sebastián ==
Two blood sisters, Dionicia Mitas Talangpaz de Santa Maria (1691–1732) and Cecilia Rosa Talangpaz de Jesus (1693–1731), of Calumpit, Bulacan, founded the second enduring beaterio for native women in 1719. Their surname, talangpaz means "rock" or "boulder" and it evokes the religious house they built on rock. Now called the Congregation of the Augustinian Recollects Sisters, it is the oldest beaterio or noncontemplative religious community for women in the worldwide Augustinian Recollect order.

The Talangpaz sisters left their comfortable home in Calumpit, Bulacan in 1719 in pursuit of their spiritual calling after their Augustinian pastor repeatedly turned down their request for permission to wear the habit of mantelata. Having heard that the Recollects were more amenable to admitting Filipino women to their Third Order, they proceeded to the Shrine of Our Lady of Carmel in San Sebastian de Calumpang in Manila, which had been administered by the Recollects since 1621. They rented a nipa hut in Bilibid Viejo behind the church apse and soon two other native beatas joined them. They also found a sympathetic confessor, Juan de Santo Tomas de Aquino.

After six patient years, their life of prayer, penance, and needlework brought the self-effacing sisters to the notice of the Recollect friars as well as the other residents of Calumpang. They revealed to the priests their desire to don the habit of mantelata, whereupon their request was forwarded to the provincial who approved it on the strength of the recommendations of their confessor and the other friars. The rites of investiture were held on July 16, 1725, the feast of Our Lady of Carmel which was also the thirty-second birthday of Mother Cecilia Rosa.

After the ceremony, the prior of San Sebastian, Diego de San Jose, presented them with a small house of nipa and bamboo at the other end of the convent's garden. Although in the beginning there were no indications of any plans to form a religious community, the sisters became interested in this project because other native women became attracted to their luminous house in the convent garden. Soon, two Indias of noble birth like them also begged for and obtained the habits of terciarias from the Recollects and joined them in their residence. A few months later, two more followed suit until they constituted a community of six beatas. At this point, the Beaterio de San Sebastian de Calumpang was formed.

== Life ==
Talangpaz was born on March 12, 1691, in Calumpit, Bulacan to half-Kapampangan parents. Together with her younger sister Cecilia, they settled down near the shrine of the Our Lady of Mount Carmel in Manila. Their devout life attracted the attention of the shrine's caretakers, the Augustinian Recollects, and in July 1725, the sisters received the habit of tertiaries and were gathered in a beaterio. The Talangpaz sisters were notably descended from ancient pre-Hispanic nobility on both sides of their family.

As explained earlier, the matriarchs of this clan may well have been catalonan who officiated at spiritual rites held on a hallowed rock, the meaning of "Talangpaz."

The sisters' maternal great-granduncle, Phelipe Sonsong (1611–1684), of Macabebe, Pampanga, was a Jesuit brother who was martyred in the Marianas. A deep devotee of Our Lady of Carmel, he also presaged the special Marian devotion of the sisters. Their maternal grandfather, Don Augustin Pamintuan, figured prominently in the Pampango Revolt of 1660.

== The controversy ==
The fame of the second native beaterio continued to spread far and wide until, unexpectedly, it drew the attention of more aspirants than it could manage. As in any religious institution, the applicants were generally of two kinds: those who were genuinely disposed to a common life of prayer and work and those who seemed to be searching for a currently prestigious way of life or running away from the harsh realities of the outside world. The problem was it was not easy to tell who was who among those who knocked at the gates of the beaterio.

The burden of screening them and supporting the growing but poor institution fell to the recollects who were then hard-pressed because their southern missions were being continually ravaged by the "Moros." Some of the aspirants tried to use the influence of important personages to gain admission to the beaterio while others refused or were unable to give a dowry or any form of material contribution to the community as required by the rules of the Tertiary order. The state of affairs polarized the recollects into two groups whom we may call the "pros" and the "contras." The pros were of the opinion that they should receive as many deserving applicants as possible with or without a dowry and trust in Divine Providence for the sustenance of the beaterio. The contras, on the other hand, ever mindful of their onerous obligations at present and in the future, recommended banning further admission to the community.

The temperamental prior, however, exasperated by the unexpected crisis, resolved the issue impulsively by demanding back the habits he had bestowed on the Talangpaz sisters and their four companions, ordering them to vacate the house in the convent garden immediately and, despite the beata's tearful entreaties, demolishing the house with his own hands with the same zeal as he had it built earlier. The forlorn sisters rented back their old nipa hut near the church and resumed their religious life even as they mourned the loss of their treasured habit of mantelatas.

Many of the Recollects, including the contras, commiserated with them but most especially their confessor, who gave them the strong support they needed in their desolation. "Father, they intimated to fray Juan, it is clear that God and the Most Holy virgin have deigned to test us and purify our souls in the crucible of sorrows. But we are so determined in our endeavor that we find more courage to suffer each day. We are like mustard seeds, which have been pressed and nearly crushed. From these shall emerge a sapling which, as the father prior will surely witness, shall grow into a big tree under whose shade the birds will build their nests and sing their canticles to God." The quotations here come from an eyewitness account of their lives by Benito Gomez de San Pablo.

Strong in hope and gifted with sibyllic vision like earlier Filipino priestesses and beatas, the sisters also sought out the prior himself to assure him with these predictive words: "Fray Diego, please bear with us. Now you spurn us and send us away, but you can be certain that later, you will be pleased to receive us back and grant us the holy habit again, and not only the two of us but others as well whom Our Lady of Carmel will call to give us company. We have great hopes that she will grant us this favor to our deep joy and that of the Recollect fathers, too. But for now, we have to be patient and suffer till Our Lord and his Most Holy Mother will have mercy on us."

== The house built on rock ==
Haunted by these words and observing his brethren's growing sympathy toward the two sisters, the irascible prior went through a metamorphosis. From being their ruthless antagonist, he became their staunch supporter. Soon he sent word to them to come to the convent, where he did receive them with great warmth and respect, promising to help them from now on with their interrupted plans for a beaterio.

Using his resources and those of the convent and the other friars together with the contributions of lay benefactors, the prior ordered the construction of a new and bigger house made of wood for the sisters and their future companions. It was located on the same site on the church hill as their first house. He had it enclosed with a fence of brick and stone for their greater security and solitude. As soon as the building was finished, he had the sisters called to transfer again to the sanctified site under the auspices of the Recollects. The latter assured them of support in exchange for their taking charge of the cleaning and washing of the sacred vestments and linen in the shrine of Our lady, a task they were only too happy to accept.

This heart warming turn of events occurred in 1728. Andres de San Fulgencio, the new prior of San Sebastian Convent compiled the rules and regulations of the beaterio, entitled "Formula y Metodo de gobierno para Nuestras Beatas Agustinas de San Sebastian". These were based on the rules of the Third Order with a collection of prayers and meditations for seven canonical hours. The first superior of the beaterio was Dionicia de Santa Maria, the elder of the two founders.

Their spiritual quest fulfilled, Cecilia Rosa de Jesus and Dionicia de Santa Maria died one after the other in 1731 and 1732, respectively, shortly after professing their simple vows. "Of these two sisters," their biographer Benito de San Pablo concluded, "it can be affirmed that the Queen of Carmel had called them to nourish them in a special manner with the sweetest nectar of her compassion. Their faultless and fervent lives, which we have witnessed, up to the time they died, move us to believe so."

Quite prophetic were the words of Benito de San Pablo, who spoke of them: Living under God's watercourse, these striving Beatas may increase in number in God's due time and cheerfully hover over the branches of the Biblical mustard.

The Beaterio de San Sebastian de Calumpang started the growth of the Congregation. The foundation which the Sisters had laid on solid rock continued to flourish and develop even after they were called to their eternal reward-Mother Cecelia Rosa on 31 July 1731 and Sor Dionisia on 12 October 1732.

The Congregation of the Augustinian Recollect Sisters, which originated in 1719, is the fruit of the missionary zeal of the Augustinian Recollect Fathers in the Philippines. It was canonically established as a Religious Congregation on August 19, 1929 and was declared of juridical autonomy by Pope Paul VI on November 20, 1970. Dionisia died in 1732, a year after her sister Cecilia.

== Beatification process ==
On September 10, 1990, the cause for the beatification of the Talangpaz sisters were opened, bestowed with the nihil obstat and thereby giving them the title Servant of God.

== See also ==
- List of Filipinos venerated in the Catholic Church
