= Chapter of Toledo =

16th-century religious meeting

The Chapter of Toledo was a meeting of the heads of the different provinces of the Order of Saint Augustine in Toledo, Spain in 1589. This meeting is considered an important part of the history of the order because this gave birth to the Augustinian Recollection. This was done through the so-called “Fifth Determination”.

Today, both the Order of Augustinian Recollects and the Order of Discalced Augustinians trace their beginnings from the fifth determination which says:

Since there is among us, or at least maybe, some who have greater love for monastic perfection and want to follow a more austere plan of life, we ought to favour their legitimate desire by not placing obstacles to the Holy Spirit; having previously consulted our most Reverend Father General and implored his leave, we determine that in our Province three or more monasteries of men and as many of women be designated or established; in them a more austere kind of life is to be practised; its manner is to be regulated, after mature reflection, by the Father Provincial with his definitorum.
