= Unzen =

Unzen may refer to:

- Mount Unzen, Kyushu, Japan
- Unzen, Nagasaki, Japan
