= Magdalene of Nagasaki =

Japanese martyr and saint (1611–1634)

Saint Magdalene of Nagasaki OAR
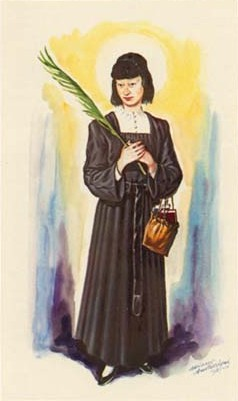

Martyr
- Born: 1611; Nagasaki, Tokugawa Shogunate
- Died: 15 October 1634 (aged 22–23); Nagasaki, Tokugawa Shogunate
- Venerated in: Catholic Church
- Beatified: 18 February, 1981, Manila, Philippines by Pope John Paul II
- Canonized: 18 October, 1987, St. Peter's Basilica by Pope John Paul II
- Major shrine: Minor Basilica and National Shrine of Saint Lorenzo Ruiz and Companions in Binondo, Manila, Philippines
- Feast: September 28 (General Roman Calendar); October 20 (Augustinian Calendar)

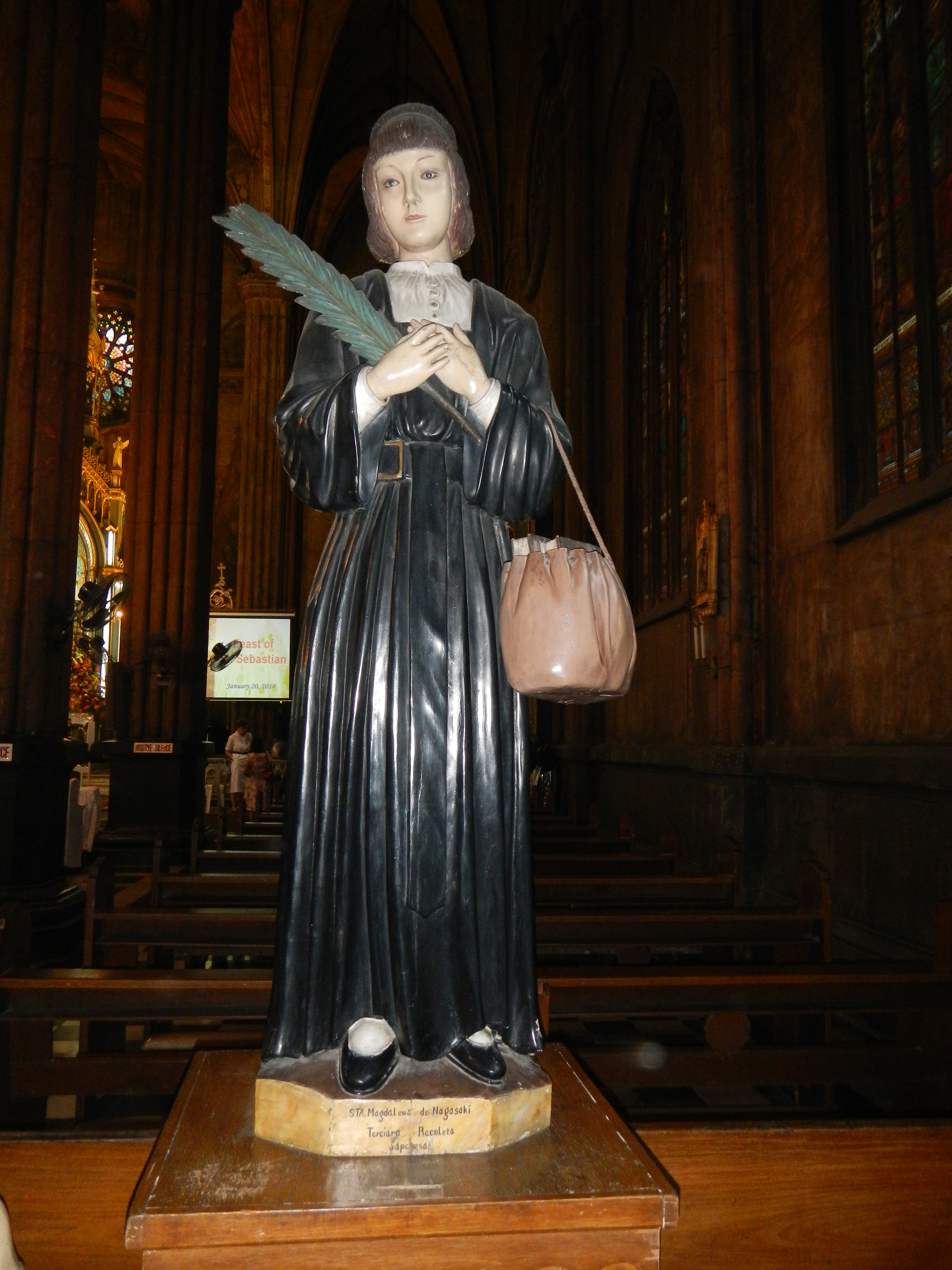
Magdalene of Nagasaki (Basilica of San Sebastian, Manila)

Magdalene of Nagasaki (長崎のマグダレナ, Nagasaki no Magudarena) (1611 – October 15, 1634) was a Japanese Christian who served as a translator and catechist for the Augustine Recollect missionaries. She became a tertiary of the Order of Augustinian Recollects.

== Life ==
Born in 1611 near Nagasaki, Magdalene was the daughter of a Christian couple martyred about 1620. With the arrival of the Augustinian Order in 1623, Magdalene served as an interpreter for the friars Francis of Jesus Terrero and Vincent of Saint Anthony Simoens. In 1625, she became a tertiary of the Order of Augustinian Recollects.

Magdalene taught catechism to the young, sought alms for the poor, and encouraged the people in times of persecution. In 1632, the two Augustinian friars who had been her spiritual counselors were burned alive. After the martyrdom of her counselors, she apprenticed herself to two other Augustinians: Melchior of Saint Augustine and Martin of Saint Nicholas. When these two friars were also put to death, she turned to Giordano Ansaloni de San Esteban, a Dominican. In 1629, she sought refuge with other Christians in the hills of Nagasaki, where she baptized the young and visited the sick.

== Martyrdom ==
Seeing so many apostatize, Magdalene turned herself into the authorities, attired in her Augustinian habit, and declared herself a follower of Jesus. At age 23, she died on October 15, 1634, after thirteen days of torture, suffocated to death and suspended upside down in a pit of offal on a gibbet (tsurushi). In the end, the pit was filled with water and she drowned. Her body was cremated and her ashes scattered in Nagasaki Bay.

== Legacy ==
She was beatified by Pope John Paul II on February 18, 1981, in Manila, and canonized on October 18, 1987, at Vatican City among the 16 Martyrs of Japan.

== Iconography ==
Though the traditional depiction of Magdalene of Nagasaki shows her wearing an Augustinian habit while holding the martyr's palm and carrying a bag through her elbow, Dominican representations instead show her wearing a kimono and holding a cross. One sculpture of her shows that she wears a veil with a crown or halo on her head. More depictions show the differences of her image, such as holding a palm leaf and rosary in separate hands.

== See also ==
- Martyrs of Japan
