= Freemasonry in the United States =

Freemasonry is a fraternal order that originated in Britain and later spread internationally through colonial expansion and migration. Its members, known as Freemasons, traditionally meet in local groups called lodges, which historically were male-only. Freemasonry emphasizes moral development, mutual aid, and ethical conduct, often expressed through symbolic rituals. Over time, the organization has interacted with a wide range of cultures and has at times faced political and social opposition.

Freemasonry has had a significant influence on the history of the United States. North America remains an important center of Freemasonry today. However, since peaking in 1959 with over 4.1 million Freemasons, membership numbers have declined significantly in recent decades. In 2023, there were just under 870,000 Freemasons in the U.S., spread across thousands of lodges in all 50 states.

== History ==
=== Grand Lodges founded during the Colonial Era ===
Freemasonry spread from the British Isles during the Colonial Era as the original Grand Lodges in England began issuing charters in North America. Starting in 1730, the "Modern" Grand Lodge of England granted warrants for Provincial Grand Lodges in the colonies. These warrants were initially issued to individuals appointed as deputies of the Grand Master, which led to overlapping jurisdictions and administrative confusion.

Following the establishment of the rival "Ancient" Grand Lodge of England, separate Provincial Grand Lodges were chartered under its authority, further complicating governance. The two competing systems, known as the "Ancients" and the "Moderns", became the dominant organizational branches of Freemasonry in the English-speaking world during the eighteenth century.

=== Timeline of Grand Lodges foundations in North America ===
- (United Kingdom) "Coxe" Provincial Grand Lodge of Pennsylvania, New Jersey, & New York (Moderns) - Est. 1730. Warrant issued to Daniel Coxe. The Grand Lodge of Pennsylvania dates itself from the formation of this Provincial Grand Lodge.
- (United Kingdom) Provincial Grand Lodge of New England (Moderns) - Est. 1733. Warrant issued to Henry Price. The Grand Lodge of Massachusetts dates itself from the formation of this Provincial Grand Lodge.
- (United Kingdom) Provincial Grand Lodge of South Carolina - Est. 1736.
- (United Kingdom) Provincial Grand Lodge of North Carolina - Est. 1771.
- (United Kingdom) Provincial Grand Lodge of New York (Moderns) - Est. 1738-1780s. Warrants issued to Francis Goelet (1738–1753), to George Harrison (1753–1771) and to Sir John Johnson (from 1771). As Johnson was a Loyalist during the American Revolution, he is believed to have taken his warrant with him when he fled to Canada, thus leaving the Moderns Lodges without a Provincial Grand Master.
- (United Kingdom) Provincial Grand Lodge for North America (Scotland) - Est. 1757. Warrant issued to Colonel John Young.
- (United Kingdom) Provincial Grand Lodge for Pennsylvania (Ancients) - Est. 1761. Warrant issued to William Ball.
- (United Kingdom) Provincial Grand Lodge of New York ("Athol Charter" - Ancients) - Est. 1781-1784. Although warranted by the "Ancients", the final Provincial Grand Master, Chancellor Robert R. Livingston (PGM: 1784–87), was actually the Master of a Lodge under the Jurisdiction of the Moderns, thus uniting the two branches of English Freemasonry in New York State. Livingston continued in office as the first Grand Master of the independent GL of NY.

=== Structure of early Freemasonry ===
Freemasonry in the colonies did not initially form a unified American organization. Individual lodges operated under charters issued by English or Scottish Grand Lodges or under the supervision of a Provincial Grand Master appointed by them. As a result, multiple competing jurisdictions could exist within a single colony. In addition to the first English Grand Lodge, founded in 1717, the rival Antient Grand Lodge of England, established in 1751, and the Grand Lodge of Scotland later also granted charters to North American lodges. No overarching American Grand Lodge emerged during the colonial period; the lodges and provincial Grand Lodges remained largely autonomous.

The split between the Moderns and the Ancients stemmed from a group of predominantly Irish Freemasons in London who, under the leadership of Laurence Dermott, founded a rival Grand Lodge in 1751. The names were polemical: the new organization called itself the Ancients because it accused the older Grand Lodge of having altered traditional rituals and neglected Masonic traditions. Social differences also lay behind the ritual dispute. The early lodges of the Moderns in the colonies were primarily supported by merchants, lawyers, government officials, and other members of the urban upper class, while the Ancients increasingly admitted artisans, small merchants, and soldiers and more consistently filled their leadership positions through elections.

In religious matters, the Moderns drew on the “religion in which all men agree” as formulated in James Anderson’s Masonic Constitutions of 1723. They required belief in a Supreme God (deism) but avoided affiliation with any particular denomination, thereby incorporating elements of the Enlightenment and natural religion. In contrast, the Ancients more frequently used explicitly Christianity as their orientation. In the colonies, the Ancients attracted more members, eventually outnumbering the Moderns, whose ranks included important American revolutionaries such as Benjamin Franklin and George Washington. The Masonic schism was finally resolved in 1813, when the Moderns adopted the fourth degree of the Ancients, who in turn accepted Freemasonry’s deistic orientation.

=== Freemasonry and the American revolution ===
Prominent Freemasons during the Revolutionary era included George Washington, Benjamin Franklin, John Hancock, Joseph Warren, and Paul Revere. The US Constitution reflected Masonic ideals such as equality, freedom of speech, and religious tolerance. Franklin, who championed the deist and Enlightenment ideals of the Moderns, was closely associated with Freemasonry and initiated the French philosopher Voltaire into a Parisian lodge after he had participated in the American Revolution. Structural similarities have been noted between Anderson’s Masonic Constitutions, Franklin’s Albany Plan of Union, the Articles of Confederation, and the U.S. Constitution. Franklin’s Albany Plan adopted the Masonic Constitution in part, word for word. Of the 55 delegates who participated in the U.S. Constitutional Convention, 33 were Freemasons. Haym Salomon, one of the revolution's most important financiers, was also a Freemason.

The Masonic influence on the symbolic language of the young republic was most evident in public ceremonies. On September 18, 1793, Washington laid the cornerstone of the Capitol as part of a Masonic ritual. He wore Masonic regalia as representatives of the Grand Lodge of Maryland and several lodges from Maryland and Virginia consecrated the cornerstone with wheat, wine, and oil. Some masonic sources view the architecture of the capital—such as the Capitol, the Washington Monument, and the White House—as influenced by Masonic architecture. However, historians see no reliable evidence for the frequently claimed intentional inclusion of a square, compass, or other Masonic symbols in Pierre Charles L’Enfant’s (possibly a Mason) design of Washington.

=== Later Grand Lodges ===
After the American Revolution, the various Provincial Grand Lodges were dissolved, and the Lodges within each state formed independent Grand Lodges. These new Grand Lodges, in turn, chartered lodges in the expanding western territories and newly admitted states. As each new state was established, the lodges operating within its borders typically convened to form their own Grand Lodges.

=== African-American lodges ===
Prince Hall Freemasonry was founded in 1784 by the black activist Prince Hall as a branch of Freemasonry for African Americans in North America. It consists of two main branches: the independent State Prince Hall Grand Lodges, most of which are recognized by predominantly white Masonic jurisdictions, and those that operate under the jurisdiction of the National Grand Lodge. Prince Hall Freemasonry is the oldest and largest predominantly African American fraternal in the United States, with more than 300,000 initiated members.

=== Rapid growth 1800–1820 ===
Masonic membership expanded rapidly during the first quarter of the 19th century, especially in the Northeastern United States. By 1800, there were 11 Grand Lodges in the United States, overseeing 347 subordinate lodges and approximately 16,000 members. By 1820, New York alone had 300 lodges with about 15,000 members, and by 1825 the state added another 150 lodges and 5,000 members.

Internationally, Freemasonry also expanded during this period, gaining a presence in Latin America and continental Europe, where French lodges became predominated and were often associated with politics and religious movements in the region.

=== Anti-Masonic Party ===
The Anti-Masonic Party was a single-issue political party that emerged in the late 1820s in opposition to Freemasonry. It later sought to develop into a broader political movement by expanding its platform to address additional public issues. The party was formed following the disappearance of William Morgan, a former Mason who had become a vocal critic of the organization. His disappearance generated widespread speculation of Masonic involvement and helped fuel anti-Masonic sentiment.

Anti-Masons argued that Freemasonry posed a threat to American republican values by exerting undue influence within government and claimed that the organization was hostile to evangelical Christianity. Concern over what was perceived as the political power of Freemasonry led to the formation of the Anti-Masonic Party. In New York State, the Anti-Masons replaced the National Republicans as the primary opposition to the Democratic Party.

Freemasons, for their part, maintained that the organization avoided direct involvement in state and national politics. They asserted that their role was to encourage cooperation among political leaders of differing views and parties and that endorsing a political party would be incompatible with this purpose. Historians generally agree that while Masons were often locally prominent and may have attempted to manage the public response to the Morgan case at the local level, the broader claims of a national conspiracy lack substantial evidence. Although Masonic membership had grown rapidly in the early nineteenth century, it declined sharply during this period: of the approximately 450 lodges operating in 1825, only about 50 remained by 1834.

As the 1830s progressed, most Anti-Masons aligned with the emerging Whig Party, which brought together voters opposed to President Andrew Jackson. Jackson was a Freemason, as was his principal political rival, Henry Clay. The Anti-Masons contributed to the Whigs a strong distrust of entrenched political elites, a rejection of rigid party loyalty, and new campaign techniques designed to mobilize voters. They also pioneered the use of national nominating conventions, holding the first such convention in 1835. By 1840, the Anti-Masonic Party had ceased functioning as a national organization, and its local chapters largely disappeared. Several former Anti-Masons, including William H. Seward, Thurlow Weed, and Thaddeus Stevens, later became prominent leaders in the Whig and Republican parties.

=== American civil war ===
During the American Civil War, political and military divisions also ran through Freemasonry. However, since regular American Freemasonry was not administered by a national Grand Lodge but by independent Grand Lodges in each individual state, there was no formal split into a central Union organization and a corresponding Confederate organization. The individual Grand Lodges and lodges largely aligned themselves with the political loyalties of their respective states, while Freemasons served in both the Union Army and the Confederate States Army. This placed a significant strain on the idea of a universal brotherhood standing above political conflicts. A report adopted in 1864 by the Grand Lodge of Virginia accused several Northern Grand Lodges of labeling Southern Freemasons as traitors and rebels and of politicizing Freemasonry in favor of the Union’s war effort.

The most famous Freemason to hold a leading position in the Confederacy was Albert Pike. He was initiated into a lodge in 1850, joined the Scottish Rite in 1853, and was elected Grand Commander of the Supreme Council of the Southern Jurisdiction in 1859, a position he held until his death in 1891. Pike held a strong belief in states' rights, supported slavery, and considered secession to be constitutionally permissible. He led Confederate troops during the Civil War. In the context of the secessionist movement, secret political societies also emerged, some of which operated along Masonic lines; among these, the Knights of the Golden Circle gained particular significance. Founded in 1854, the organization initially sought to establish a vast empire based on slavery that would encompass the southern United States, Mexico, the Caribbean, and parts of Central America. With the failure of these expansionist plans, it shifted its focus to supporting secession and mobilizing militias in the Southern states. The Knights of the Golden Circle were linked to various political conspiracies, including allegedly the assassination of Abraham Lincoln. Albert Pike was named as a member of the Knights. The Knights later became an inspiration for the Ku Klux Klan.

=== International affairs ===
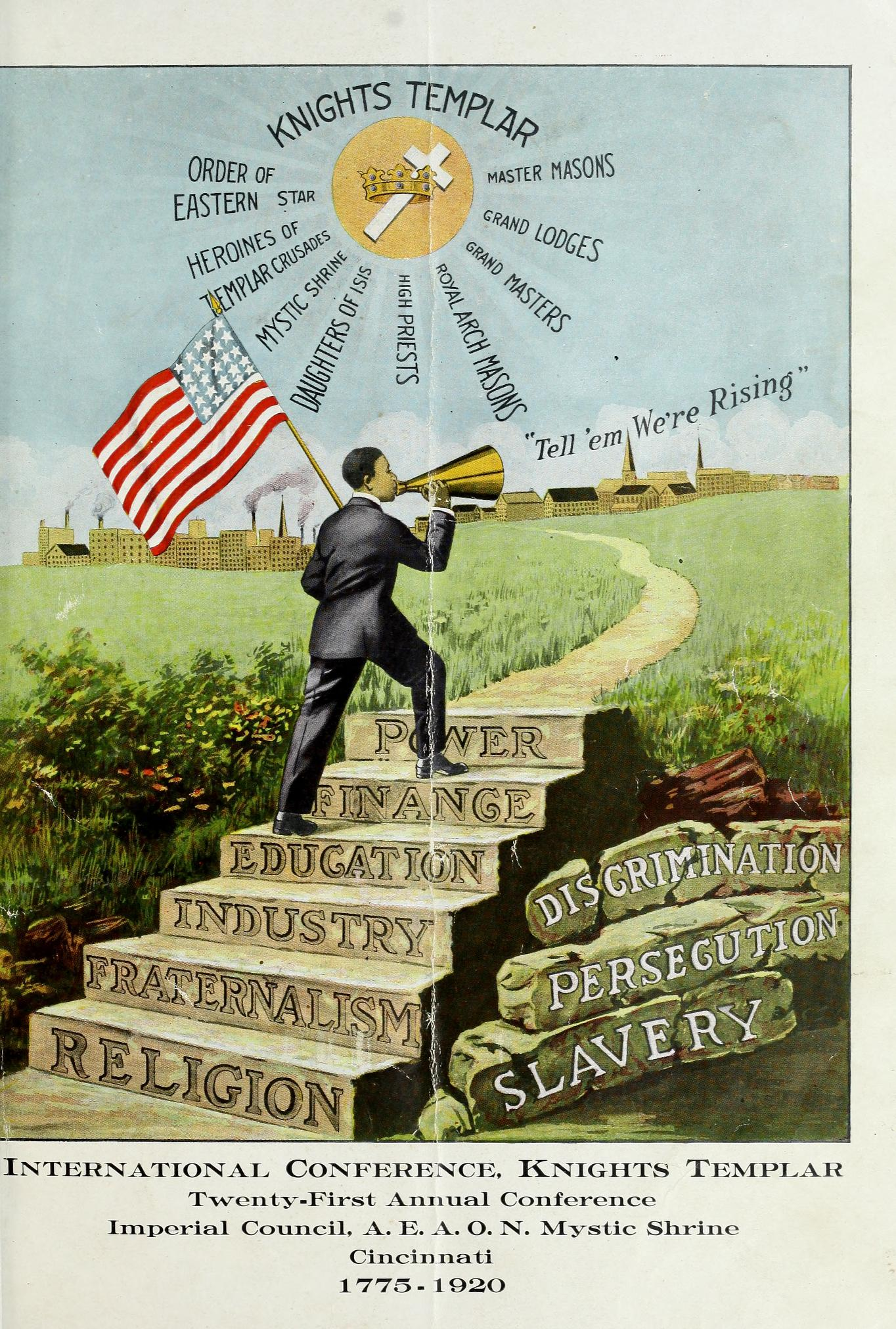
Illustration promoting African American ascent of the ladder of success, from a Prince Hall Masonic convention program book in 1920

In addition to maintaining connections with Masonic bodies in other countries, the Masonic movement functioned as a mechanism for international cooperation among national leaders and public figures. From the late nineteenth century onward, Masonic lodges played a significant role in efforts to establish lasting links between nations. Their activity was particularly notable during the period from 1914 to 1919, when leaders opposed to Germany worked to shape favorable public opinion toward former rivals who had become wartime allies. Masonic leaders in London and Paris were especially involved in promoting support for the Allied cause in the United States. In 1918, Freemasons also sought to build backing for the League of Nations, with New York lodges taking a prominent role. Although political discussions were formally prohibited during lodge meetings, Masonic networks brought together individuals with shared views who cooperated in promoting internationalist ideas beyond their local lodges.

=== The Golden Age of Freemasonry in the Late 19th and 20th Centuries ===
In the decades following the American Civil War, Freemasonry experienced rapid expansion amid a general boom in American fraternal and lodge organizations. This period, spanning roughly from 1870 to the onset of the Great Depression, is often referred to as the “golden age of fraternalism.” Just under 40 percent of the American population were members of an association around 1900. Masonic lodges and other fraternities offered their members ritualized fellowship, social contacts, opportunities for public engagement, and, in some cases, material support. In 1900, both the Freemasons and the Independent Order of Odd Fellows each had approximately one million members, making them among the largest voluntary associations in the country.

Consistent membership statistics have been available since 1924 for the Grand Lodges tracked by the Masonic Service Association of North America. Their membership rose from 3,077,161 in 1924 to 3,295,872 in 1928. The Great Depression brought this period of growth to an end; by 1941, the number had fallen to 2,451,301. However, a second phase of expansion began during and after World War II: from 2,896,343 members in 1945, the total number rose to a historic high of 4,103,161 by 1959.

=== Decline in membership since the 1960s ===
After peaking in 1959, membership numbers began a steady decline. The total number recorded by the Masonic Service Association fell from 4,099,219 in 1960 to 3,763,213 in 1970 and 2,531,643 in 1990. In 2000, 1,841,169 members were reported; the most recent published total for 2023 was 869,429 members. The decline was not a phenomenon limited to Freemasonry, but rather part of a broader trend, observable since the 1960s, of declining participation in traditional fraternities, service clubs, and other membership-based organizations. There is no consensus among researchers regarding a single cause. Possible external factors cited include changes in work and family structures, new leisure activities, and the provision of social and material support services by government or commercial institutions, which has caused traditional lodges to lose some of their former functions.

== Social and cultural roles ==
Historian Mark Carnes has argued that Freemasons, along with other fraternal organisations such as the Odd Fellows, the Improved Order of Red Men, and the Knights of Pythias, contributed to cultural shifts in perceptions of traditional masculinity through the use of elaborate secret rituals. Lodges developed initiation ceremonies that incorporated chains, skeletons, robes, masks, blindfolds, and torchlight, in part as a response to what Carnes described as the growing feminization of mainstream Protestant religious culture. These practices fostered a distinct private culture of shared symbols and ritual that functioned as an alternative social space. One prominent California Freemason articulated this view by rejecting what he characterised as "dreaminess", "sentimentalism", and comparisons to social or church gatherings, instead emphasizing Freemasonry as an organization centered on masculine identity.

Although women were not members of Freemasonry, their support played a role in the organisation's recovery after the 1830s. Wives and female authors often benefited from and contributed to Masonic networks. In 1823, for example, Sarah Josepha Hale published a collection of her poems, The Genius of Oblivion, with financial assistance from her late husband’s lodge. The Masonic community continued to support Hale's career, particularly during her forty-year tenure as editor of Godey's Lady's Book, one of the most influential women’s magazines of the nineteenth century.

== See also ==
- Freemasonry
- History of Masonic Grand Lodges in North America
