= Miracles of St. Francis Xavier (Rubens) =

C. 1618 painting by Peter Paul Rubens

The Miracles of St. Francis Xavier
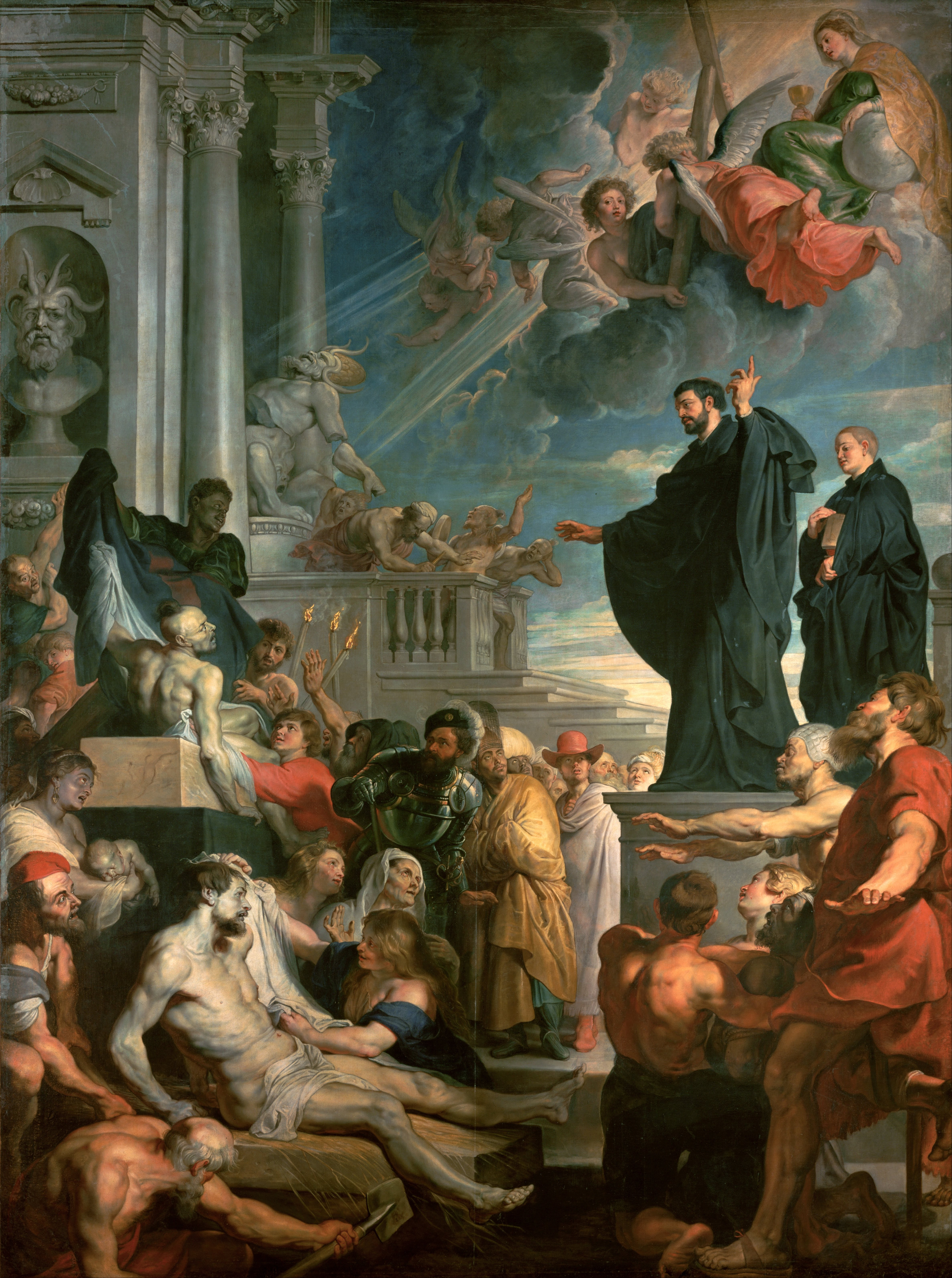
- Peter Paul Rubens – The Miracles of St. Francis Xavier
- Artist: Peter Paul Rubens
- Year: 1617 or 1618
- Medium: oil on canvas
- Dimensions: 535 cm × 395 cm (211 in × 156 in)
- Location: Kunsthistorisches Museum, Vienna

The Miracles of St. Francis Xavier is a large altarpiece painted by Peter Paul Rubens in 1617 or 1618. It was originally commissioned by the Jesuits in Antwerp for their church, now known as the St. Charles Borromeo Church. It is now in the Kunsthistorisches Museum in Vienna. The painting depicts the miracles worked by St. Francis Xavier during his mission to Asia and includes a large variety of figures from Asia and Africa, as well as the destruction of a Hindu idol in the background. Rubens also painted a companion piece, The Miracles of St. Ignatius of Loyola.

== History ==
A contract was created between Rubens and Jacobus Tirinus, the head of the Antwerp Jesuits in 1620. The contract stated that Rubens must create at least thirty-nine ceiling paintings and two large paintings for the church, in which he will be rewarded with ten thousand florins. The two large paintings would then be displayed in rotation. This painting and The Miracles of St. Ignatius of Loyola became the two altarpieces for the church. By the time the contract was signed, the two altarpieces were already completed. This altarpiece was completed before St. Francis Xavier became a saint in 1622.

This painting, along with The Miracles of St. Ignatius of Loyola, were purchased by the Austrian Empress Maria Theresa after a fire caused the St. Charles Borromeo Church to close in 1773. They are currently in the Kunsthistorisches Museum located in Vienna.

== Description ==
The main figure, St. Francis Xavier, is on the right side of the altarpiece, standing on a platform. Different events are combined and used to display St. Francis Xavier performing many miracles. On the left side of the altarpiece, a baby is being held by the mother. The baby has water coming from his mouth. There are people rising from the dead. Next to the mother and baby is a male figure that looks similar to a figure in another art piece created by Rubens, The Great Last Judgement. Near the upper left corner of the altarpiece between the two columns, there is statue that wears a crown and has an open mouth at the middle portion of the body. The figure is positioned like it is in the motion of falling. On the right side, there is a blind man that is reaching out with his arms.

=== Figure studies ===
Rubens drew numerous life studies before the altarpiece was completed. The majority of changes that were made focused on the forms and gestures of the figures. Rubens created studies of St. Francis Xavier's gestures to give him a pose that shows that he is healing people. There were studies created of the people that St. Francis Xavier is performing miracles on. Rubens took perspective into account by softening the altarpiece after thinking about how the painting would look from far away.

== Counter-Reformation ==
As a result of the Counter-Reformation, Rubens' paintings focused strongly on Catholic doctrine. The paintings contained a lot of dynamic movement, barely visible outlines, and variety of tones. The theme of miracles is a key component to the altarpiece. This was used to show that St. Francis Xavier had the ability to perform miracles and restore faith to the Roman Catholic Church. St. Francis Xavier's abilities in this painting were used as propaganda as a part of his canonization trials. His ability to resurrect the dead made him closer to heavenly figures.

== Interpretation ==
It is suggested that the setting of the painting focuses on St. Francis Xavier's missionary actions in Asia. These actions caused people to spread word about his miracles. Researchers know that Rubens received information about the geography and history of Asian culture from Theodore de Bry. Rubens used this information and information he knew about European culture, which resulted in a setting that combined aspects of both cultures. It is known that the baby being held by the mother symbolizes the event when St. Francis Xavier resurrected a baby from drowning in India. In the middle of the painting, there are men in Korean outfits who symbolize people who initially questioned St. Francis Xavier's ability to perform his miracles. They were eventually convinced of St. Francis Xavier's ability.

=== Hindu idol ===
The figure that wears a crown is interpreted as a Hindu idol. Rubens drew this figure based on the information he received from sculptures and travel accounts about Indian culture. Another way Rubens received information about Indian culture was through goods from India that were traded in Antwerp. Specifically, the idol was based on the Western interpretation of Indian gods. In the Western interpretation, Hindu idols were shown as demonic figures. The figure has an open mouth on its body because this concept in Western art represented the devil. The figure's position and St. Francis Xavier's gesture show that St. Francis Xavier is directing the heavenly vision that is attacking the figure. This interpretation follows St. Francis Xavier's time in India in which he persuaded people to follow the Church and get rid of any depictions of their previous religion.

=== Plague victim ===
Researchers are not sure how Rubens received information about the bubonic plague, a deadly disease, because he never had the disease. There is a possibility that Rubens received information about the disease through plague treatises. Another possibility is that Rubens was inspired by an art piece created by Jacopo Tintoretto, called St. Roch Healing Plague Victims. The art piece has figures that have postures similar to the male figure in this painting. It is theorized that the male figure in the lower left corner of the altarpiece is to have been a victim of the plague. It is suggested that the male figure's posture has been referenced from other paintings that depict the plague. Among these plague paintings include St. Francis of Paola, another painting created by Rubens. Researchers have theorized that the plague is symbolized by the figure's exposed underarm.

=== Chinese figure ===
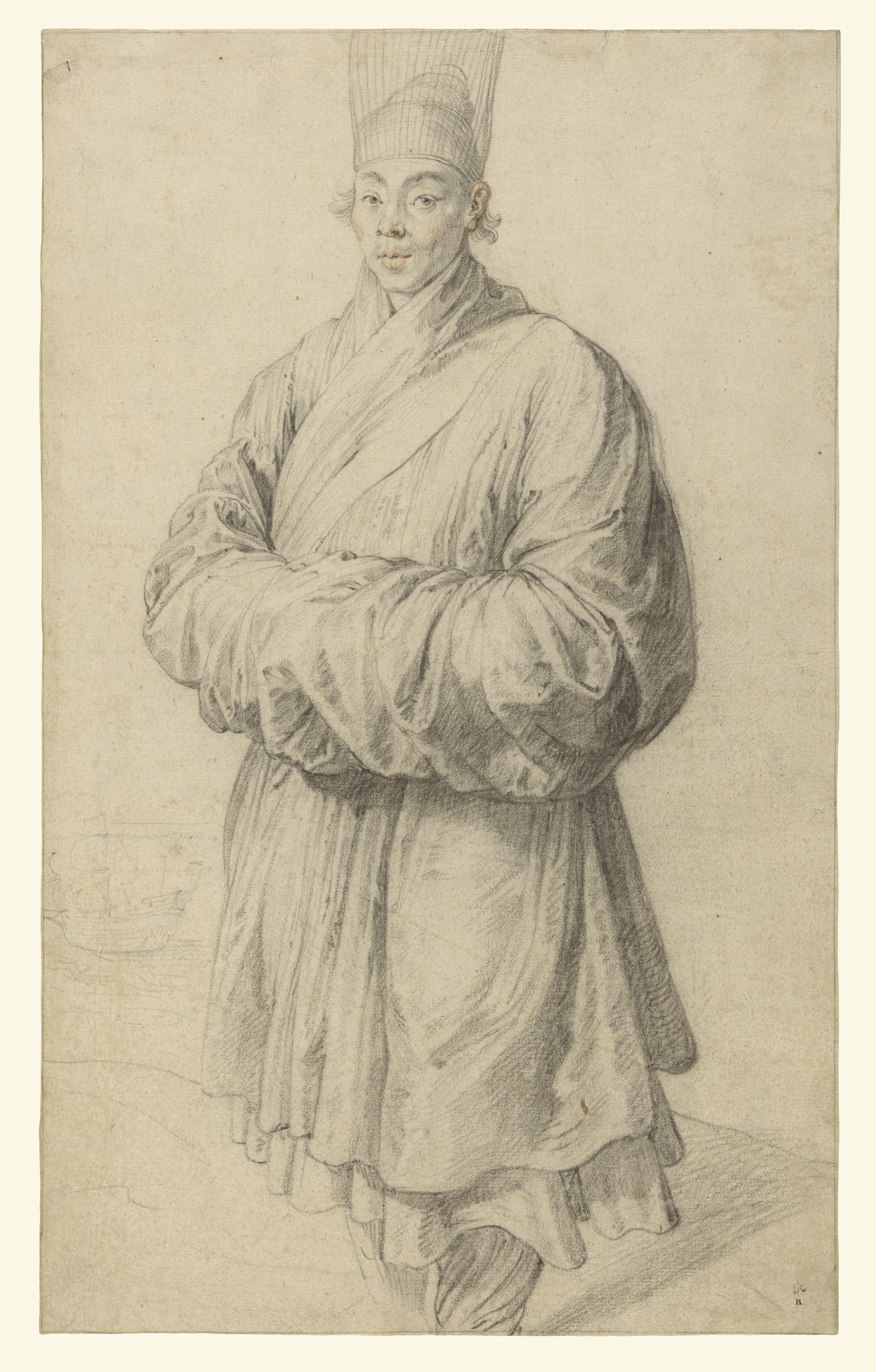
Man in Korean Costume, c. 1617, black and red chalk, J. Paul Getty Museum

There is a figure wearing attire that might be Korean or Chinese in the center of the painting. This figure resembles the subject of one Rubens's drawings, traditionally known as Man in Korean Costume. Rubens used foreign attire in his paintings to add dramatic effects. The figure was originally going to wear Turkish attire, but the Jesuits wanted a variety of clothing to represent their activity in Asia. They did not have a direct relationship with Korea during the seventeenth century, but they learned about the country through their activities in China. The Jesuits displayed their victories and activities outside the country by displaying foreign attire in art pieces. The East Asian attire in this painting symbolizes the belief that Catholicism was superior while demoting paganism to a primitive status. Recent research has demonstrated that the man is actually a Chinese Protestant from the Ming period named Yppong. The confusion was made because of the similarities in clothing.

== Sources ==
- Baudouin, Frans. (1989). Pietro Pauolo Rubens. London, England: Bracken Books: 20, 106, 157–158.
- Boeckl, Christine. (1996). "Plague Imagery as Metaphor for Heresy in Rubens' The Miracles of Saint Francis Xavier." The Sixteenth Century Journal 27(4): 979–995
- Burchard, L. (1963). Rubens Drawings. Brussels: Arcade Press. 154, 179–181.
- Downes, Kerry. (2003). Rubens /. London: Chaucer: 122–123, 128.
- Glen, Thomas L. (1977). Rubens and the Counter Reformation: Studies in His Religious Paintings between 1609 and 1620 /. New York:: Garland Pub.
- Miller, Rachel. (2018). "Peter Paul Rubens's Investigation of the Origins of Idolatry and Iconoclasm in the Jesuit Church of Antwerp." IKON: 127–140.
- Sauerländer, Willibald. (2014). "New Saints and Reinvigorated Veneration of the Saints." The Catholic Rubens. Los Angeles: Getty Research Institute: 90–96.
- Schrader, Stephanie. (2013). Looking East: Rubens's encounter with Asia. Los Angeles: Getty Publications. 1–7, 39–60.
- Spinks, Jennifer. (2014). "The Southern Indian 'Devil in Calicut' in Early Modern Northern Europe: Images, Texts and Objects in Motion." Journal of Early Modern History 18(1/2): 15–48.doi:1163/15700658-12342383.
- Uppenkamp, Barbara. (2016). "'Indian' motifs in Peter Paul Rubens's The Martyrdom of Saint Thomas and The miracles of Saint Francis Xavier." Nederlandsch kunsthistorisch jaarboek. 66:112–141.
