= Francesco Carletti =

Florentine merchant and traveler (1573–1636)

- Born: 1573; Florence, Grand Duchy of Tuscany
- Died: January 12, 1636 (aged 62–63); Florence, Grand Duchy of Tuscany
- Occupations: Merchant, traveler
- Notable work: My Voyage Around the World

Francesco Carletti (1573 – January 12, 1636) was a Florentine merchant, explorer and writer. He was the first private traveler to circumnavigate the globe without royal or religious sponsorship, leaving Florence in 1591 at the age of eighteen and returning in 1606. His account of the trip, the ''Ragionamenti'', was not printed until 1701, significantly after his death. During the journey, Carletti and his father took part in the slave trade, which he later described in his writings with some doubt. In 2026, an exhibition about his voyage opened at the Biblioteca Medicea Laurenziana in Florence.

== Early life ==
Francesco was born into a merchant family dating back to the 13th century. Upon turning eighteen, in 1591, his father Antonio sent him to Seville, where he apprenticed under Niccolò Parenti, another Florentine merchant. There, Francesco obtained a commercial education in subjects including language, negotiation, calculation, geography, and more. In 1593, Antonio joined his son in Seville and they prepared an expedition for the purpose of purchasing African slaves and transporting them for sale in the West Indies. Because voyages to the Indies were legally reserved for Spaniards, Francesco served as the false proxy of the Spanish wife of the Pisan merchant Cesare Baroncini, while Antonio traveled illicitly as one of the mariners on the small ship they rented.

== Travels ==
Carletti and his father departed for Cape Verde on January 8, 1594. There they purchased 50 male and 25 female slaves and set off for Cartagena, Colombia. On the journey, many suffered from illness and malnutrition, with seven dying. Compounding the loss, the slaves fetched a much lower price than anticipated in Cartagena, depleting 40 percent of the Carlettis' capital. While the Carlettis were in Cartagena, Francesco was arrested on the false grounds of lacking adequate slave export licenses. A letter from Pietro de' Medici, the brother of the Tuscan Grand Duke Ferdinando I de' Medici, to the city's governor led to his release without blame and to a settlement that let the family stay and do business throughout the Spanish Americas. After all of this, rather than returning to Spain with such disappointing results, they opted to chance the rest of their funds on purchasing manufactured goods to transport further west to Nombre de Dios, the gateway to Panama.

The Carlettis made a much more agreeable profit selling their wares in Panama, and determined to continue across the isthmus to Panama City on the Pacific coast. After a month of grueling jungle travel, they arrived in September 1594, and remained recuperating for several months. They then sailed down the coast to Lima, Peru, where they sold the last of their slaves at much greater price due to the more limited supply of labor. Afterwards, they planned to head north to Mexico City, in New Spain, and purchase more imported goods, which they would then return to Lima to sell. However, upon discovering the vast array of valuable trade goods flowing from Asia via the Philippines, the Carlettis decided to head directly to the source. They obtained passage on the Manila galleon, sailing from Acapulco and arriving on the island of Luzon in June 1596, where they would remain for a year. To get aboard, Antonio and Francesco had arranged with the captain to be registered as the ship's constable of the artillery and ship's guardian, respectively, handing their salary to the captain, who supplied two sailors to do the work. They also entrusted their goods to the captain for a 2 percent fee, despite an order meant to limit bullion exports. In Manila, however, poor commercial conditions and a system that reserved the galleon's return cargo space for the city's inhabitants led them to seek a route home through Portuguese India. Castilians arriving from the West Indies were forbidden to enter Portuguese Asia, on pain of being imprisoned and sent to Lisbon in irons, and Carletti knew that no governor could license the trip. The Carlettis left secretly one night on a Japanese ship bound for Japan, which Carletti described as a "free country" where neither the Portuguese nor the Castilians held command.

In June of 1597, the Carlettis traveled to Nagasaki, where they viewed the crucifixion site of the 26 Martyrs of Japan, who had been executed just months earlier. Francesco recorded other examples of the harsh Japanese system of justice, including collective punishment and the practice of harakiri. Carletti also noted the possible profit to be gained from journeying to Japan, claiming it was "one of the most beautiful and best and most suitable regions in the world for making profit". He cited "their need of every sort of manufacture and their abundance of silver" as reasons one could make incredible wealth quickly. The Imjin War ongoing at the time resulted in thousands of Korean captives being brought to Japan as slaves, five of which Carletti bought at a very low price. He had them all baptized, and would later set them free in Goa. One, known as António Corea, continued traveling with Carletti back to Florence, later making his way to Rome. Corea is renowned in Korea, as he is possibly the first Korean person to set foot in Europe.

In March of 1598, the Carlettis sailed on a Japanese smuggling ship to the Portuguese warehouse at Macao, where they were immediately apprehended for lacking any trading license, and imprisoned by the local authorities. Over their three days in custody, they were questioned about their origins, intentions, and knowledge of the prohibitions in place. Carletti argued that they were Italians coming from Japan, a free country not subject to either Iberian power, and that the movement of people across the world ought to be considered legal. They were released on bail but forbidden to return to Japan, and the authorities ordered them to present themselves to the viceroy in Goa. Antonio Carletti died in Macao on 20 July 1598. After burying his father, Francesco remained in Macao until December 1599. During this time, he experienced a typhoon and a lunar eclipse, while purchasing luxury Chinese export goods including porcelain, silk, and musk. He also got a two-volume Chinese atlas of texts and maps, the Guangyu kao, printed around 1596 in east-central China. Scholar Michela Bussotti infers that he acquired it in Macao, though there is no direct evidence. Carletti annotated it in Italian, finishing his notes with a list of Chinese characters and criticizing older maps that showed Korea as an island, but he had no time to have it fully translated. He brought it back to Florence, where it is kept in the national library.

Finally embarking on the homeward leg of the long voyage, Carletti departed Macao in December 1599 and passed through Malacca en route to Goa, the capital of Portuguese India. He made a substantial profit selling his Chinese goods and enjoyed a prosperous existence there for 21 months, writing that "there is no other region in the world in which it is possible to live better and more lavishly!" Eventually growing homesick, he purchased passage on a Portuguese ship to return to Europe, leaving Goa on Christmas Day, 1601.

At the island of St. Helena, the ship was intercepted by Dutch ships of the Zeeland Company and defeated in battle on 14–16 March 1602. Unlike the Portuguese passengers, who were left on the island of Fernando de Noronha, Carletti was taken to Zeeland after he threatened the Dutch with retribution against their merchants by Grand Duke Ferdinando I, a threat made credible by the Medici coat of arms on a bed he was bringing back from China, though nearly all of his wealth had been confiscated. After three years of pursuing legal challenges to gain back his property, Carletti was given a small settlement of 13,000 florins in 1605, barely enough to cover his legal expenses. The settlement was given after Ferdinando I threatened to confiscate the goods of Dutch merchants in Livorno, and Carletti thought the payment was insufficient. After Carletti stopped in Paris to explore working for the French crown and to thank Queen Marie de' Medici for her support, he returned to Florence on 12 July 1606. However, the Grand Duke Ferdinando I soon summoned him to court, eager to learn of his experiences, and the commercial opportunities available, on the other side of the world. Carletti collected his travel accounts in a book of twelve Arguments, dedicated to Ferdinand. A completed manuscript was finished circa 1619, however only in 1701 was it published, long after his death and after having been edited by multiple writers, including Lorenzo Magalotti. Carletti remained in Florence for roughly the next thirty years, no longer a global traveler but a courtier with an interesting story to tell, and became a Medici agent with knowledge of key parts of the world.

== Writings ==
As a private, self-funded traveler, Carletti was not writing out of obligation to report his progress to any sponsors, or to support any political or religious organization's agenda. Nor, as a Florentine, would he have felt any particular pride or need to whitewash the situation in the primarily Spanish and Portuguese colonial holdings he traveled through. Instead, his more conversational account reflects both a practical, mercantile mindset, as well as a general fascination with the exotic peoples and practices he encountered. Carletti also included informative navigation and nautical details, such as latitude, longitude and monsoon patterns. A 2025 collection of essays edited by Brian Brege, Paula Findlen, Luca Molà, and Giorgio Riello, Trading at the Edge of Empires: Francesco Carletti's World, c. 1600, has been described by reviewer Peter Gordon as "(apparently) the first volume in English (other than translations of the work itself)" on Carletti. Gordon notes that Carletti expressed misgivings about the slave trade in the Ragionamenti, but that this did not seem, as the book's commentators note more than once, to stop him from taking part in it. Carletti divided his original manuscript into two sections known as "Discorso", and each section into six chapters dubbed "Ragionamenti". The two sections reflect the Spanish and Portuguese division of the globe based off the 1494 signed Treaty of Tordesillas.

=== Slavery ===
Under his father's direction, Carletti took part in the Atlantic slave trade, including the sale of enslaved people in Cartagena and Peru. In the Ragionamenti, Carletti wrote that the branding of the enslaved, which he remembered doing "under orders from a superior," caused him "some sadness and confusion of conscience," and that it seemed to him an inhuman trade unworthy of a pious Christian. He added that it was all the more shameful when the enslaved had been baptized, since they had the same souls as their owners, and he wrote that the business "never pleases me," though he carried it out anyway. The editors of the 2025 essay collection describe him as one of the early European critics of slavery who actively participated in the trade, and note that he freed the enslaved people he acquired in Asia. Carletti made no mention of the slave commerce in the Philippines, shifting his focus onto importing Chinese and Japanese goods for export to New Spain.

=== Agriculture ===
While in New Spain, Carletti observed the native agricultural practice of chinampa, marveling at how "they cultivate diverse things with much artfulness" through advanced irrigation. He also encountered small fruits which could be crushed and brewed into "a certain drink, which the Indians call chocolate," and which Carletti himself quickly developed a taste for, stating, "it is hard to give up drinking it every morning or, in fact, in the evening after supper when the weather is warm and particularly when one is traveling." Also of note were "roots called patatas," which would soon become a global staple. Carletti also discusses two types of palms used to make drinks. one of them was known as nippa, and the other was called Indian nuts. The locals "make wine from both", and Carletti remarks "it becomes a liquor like aqua vitae in color and flavor".

In Japan, Carletti was frequently served cha (tea), as it was habitually offered to guests as a matter of manners, "as they do with wine in the regions of Flanders and Germany." And in Malacca, he found growing a dizzying array of tropical fruits and spices, from mangosteen and durian to cloves, cinnamon, and nutmeg.

=== Sexuality ===
Carletti's attention was often drawn to matters of what he termed the "pleasures of Venus." In Manila he specially paid to observe the procedure of male genital piercing called palang, and he wrote extensively on the practice of miǎnlíng in Macao.

Carletti was also fascinated by the appearance of bisaio men. These men would tatoo their entire bodies with geometric designs, as well as representations of animals, plants, and other symbols, yet would otherwise remain naked. Carletti found this a "beautiful and disquieting sight in the presence of their women", who are clothed but leave their legs and feet exposed. They would decorate the exposed parts of their body with bracelets made of precious stones that correspond to their social status. However, Carletti disapproved that both men and women wore heavy earrings, and that both sexes painted their teeth with red varnish.

Not content to be a mere observer, Carletti had relations with various women throughout his travels, ultimately declaring mixed Indian-Portuguese women to be "the most desirous creatures imaginable" according to his tastes. He was regretfully unable to assess the merits of Chinese women during his time in Macao, who "are said to be very beautiful and well made, but [...] the men are so jealous of these women that they never allow them to see anyone." In Japan, by contrast, agents approached sailors as soon they landed, offering to provide girls at reasonable prices. In Japan, Carletti described the women as very beautiful but noted their very small eyes and their blackened teeth, which he found strange-looking.

== Legacy ==
An exhibition, Global Florence: The World of Francesco Carletti, ca. 1573–1636, an exhibition about Carletti's circumnavigation, opened at the Biblioteca Medicea Laurenziana in Florence on 9 October 2026 and is scheduled to run until 9 January 2027. It involves Stanford University, Syracuse University, and the European University Institute, among other organizations. The exhibition brings together 69 works, including prints, drawings, artifacts, and maps, from the Laurenziana and other Florentine and Italian collections. Among them is a Chinese atlas annotated by Carletti. A companion website will host a virtual exhibition, along with videos and other resources on Carletti.

== Works and translations ==
Title page of the 1701 first edition of Carletti's Ragionamenti del mio viaggio intorno al mondo, printed in Florence

- In Italian: Francesco Carletti: Ragionamenti di Francesco Carletti Fiorentino sopra le cose da lui vedute ne’ suoi viaggi si dell’ Indie Occidentali, e Orientali Come d’altri Paesi.
- Into German: Francesco Carletti "Reise um die Welt 1594: Erlebnisse eines Florentiner Kaufmanns," translated by Ernst Bluth. Herrenalb/Schwarzwald: Erdmann, 1966.
- Into English: Francesco Carletti "My Voyage Around the World", translated by Herbert Weinstock, Random House, New York, 1964. OCLC 966632
- Into Dutch: Francesco Carletti "Reis om de Wereld", translated by Jo Verhaart-Bodderij, Kruseman, Den Haag, 1958; 1985
