= Yppong =

Early Chinese visitor to Europe (fl. 16th–17th century)

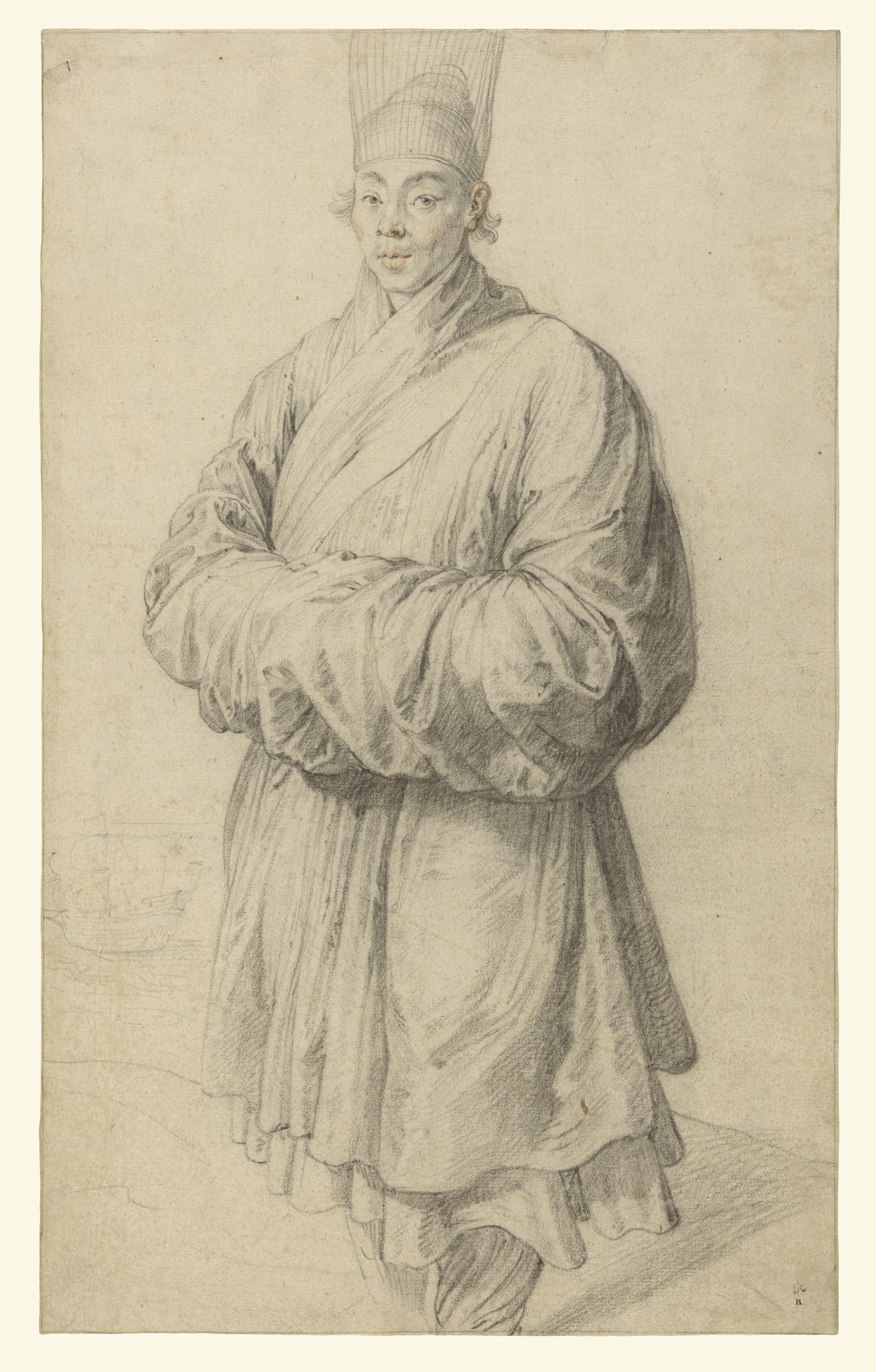
Chalk drawing of Yppong by Rubens

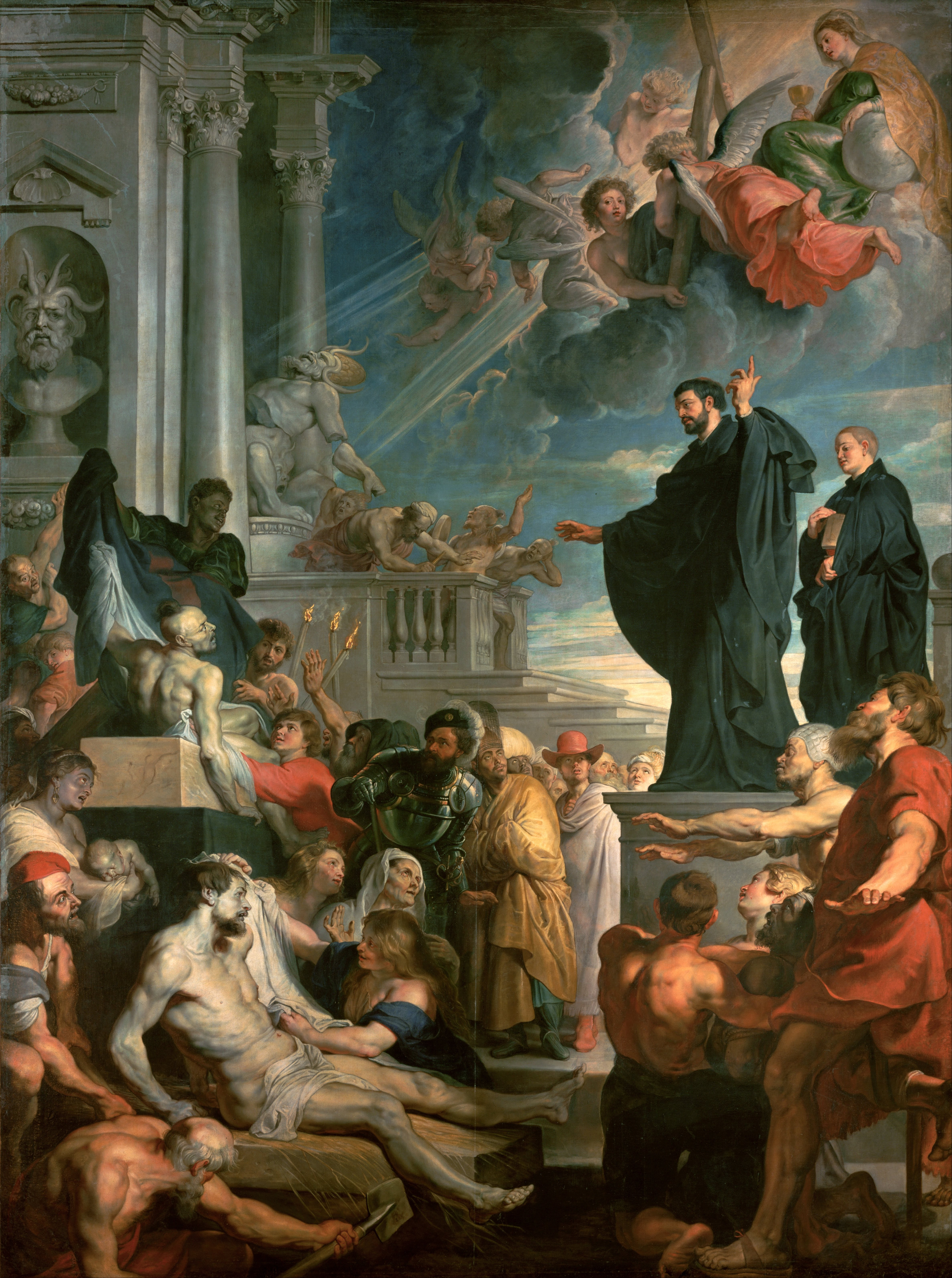
Yppong (center, in yellow), as one of the onlookers, on Miracles of St. Francis Xavier by Rubens

Yppong (birth date unknown, died in Maluku, 1614) was a Chinese merchant, presumably named Xing Pu 興浦 (simplified 兴浦) in Mandarin Chinese ("Yppong" is how his name was rendered in Latin and Dutch texts that record his travels). He is one of the first Chinese and Asians to have visited Europe in recorded history.

On 31 May 1600, he boarded a vessel for Europe at Banten, Java, purely out of curiosity, and arrived in Middelburg later that year, and would remain there for several months. During this period he was converted to Protestantism. According to historians, his level of calligraphy shows that he did not belong to the uppermost classes of society.

The English translation of his Chinese inscription is "A guest merchant from the Great Ming, named Yppong, first arrived at the lower port of Banten, then proceeded to the province of Zeeland, afterwards visited the province of Holland, returned to Banten, and finally made his way back to the Great Ming. In Holland, in the year 1600, on a Friday of January, in Vlissingen, he left this note as a record."

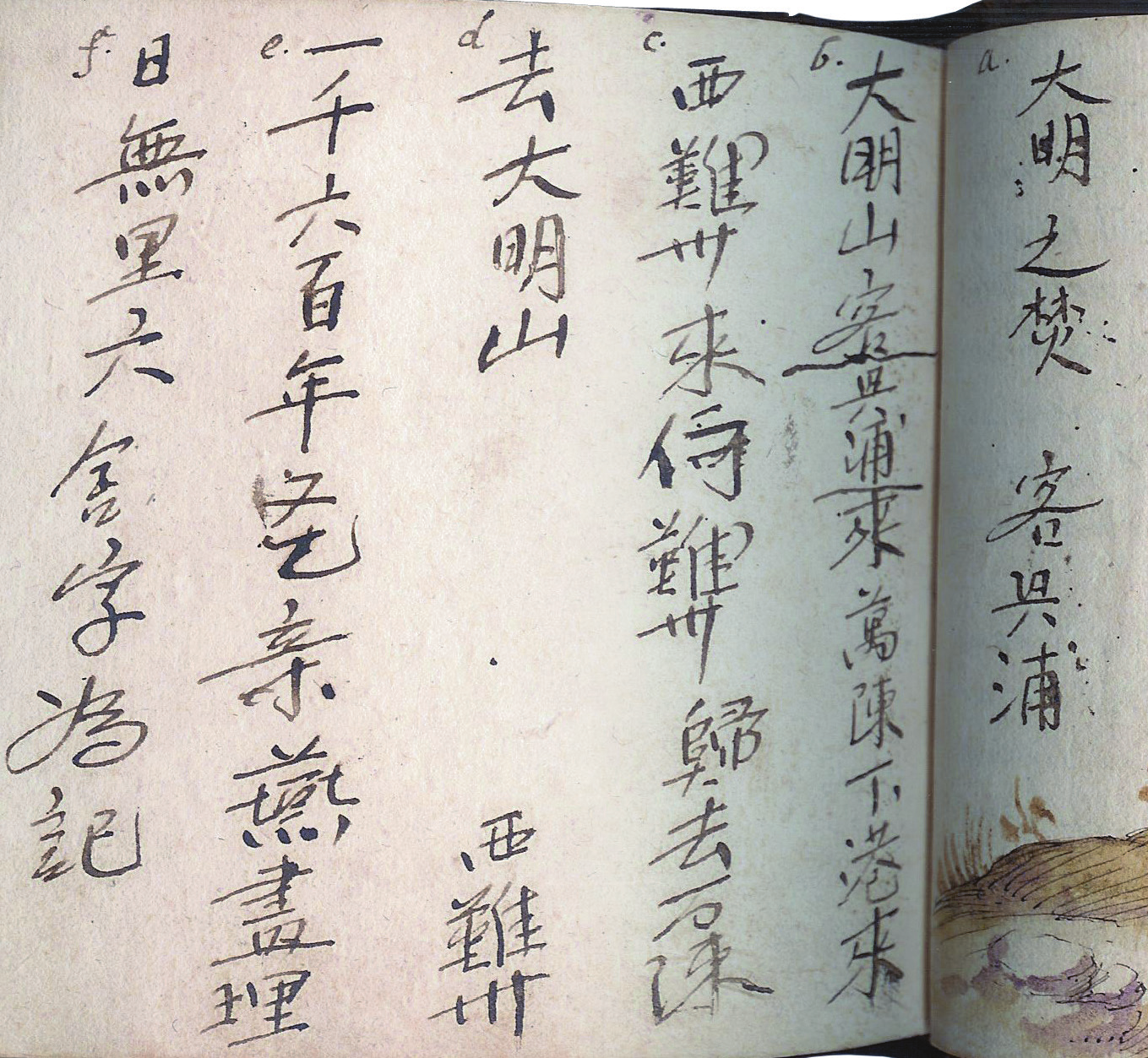
Self-Inscription on the Painting of Yppong

He was probably portrayed by Rubens in his painting Miracles of St. Francis Xavier (c. 1617) and on a chalk drawing of the same year. The hat worn by Yppong on the portrayals designates literacy. Rubens and Yppong never actually met, as Rubens was in Venice at the time of Yppong's visit. Up to 2016, the man pictured was thought to be Korean, possibly António Corea.

== In popular culture ==
In 2019/2020, horeca tycoon Won Yip posed as Yppong for the photo series "Hollandse Meesters Herzien" in Museum The Hermitage, Amsterdam.

In 2021, artist Lisianne Smit devoted an exhibition to Yppong in the Abdijcomplex in the city of Middelburg.

In 2024, Yppong featured briefly in the Dutch TV series Hollandse Meesters Herzien.
