= Thomas the Apostle =

Apostle of Jesus

Saint Thomas the Apostle
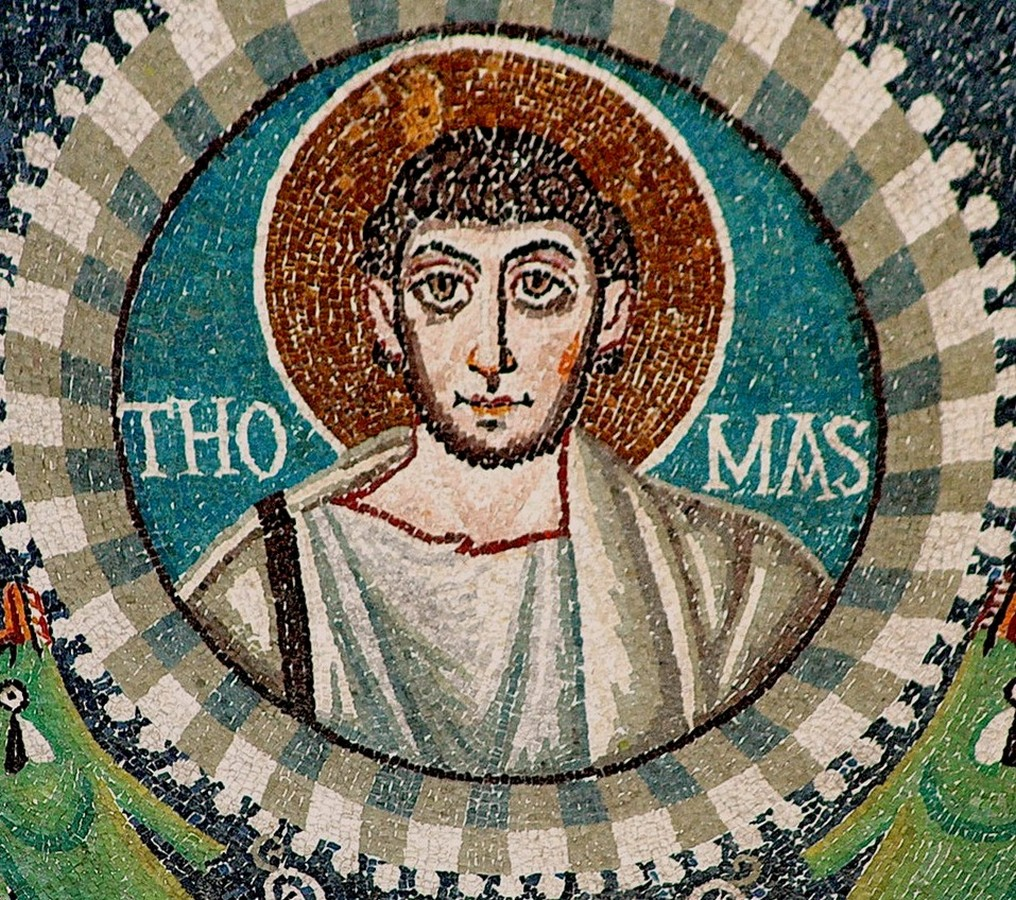
- Thomas the Apostle, detail of the mosaic in the Basilica of San Vitale, Ravenna, 6th century

Apostle, Preacher, Bishop, and Martyr
- Born: 1st century AD; Galilee, Judea, Roman Empire
- Died: December 21, 72 AD; St. Thomas Mount, Chola Kingdom; modern-day Santhome, Tamil Nadu
- Venerated in: All Christian denominations that venerate saints, especially Saint Thomas Christians
- Canonized: Pre-Congregation
- Major shrine: St. Thomas Cathedral Basilica in Mylapore, India; St. Thomas Syro-Malabar Church in Palayur, India; Basilica of St. Thomas the Apostle in Ortona, Italy
- Feast: 3 July: Syro-Malabar Catholic Church, Syro-Malankara Catholic Church, Jacobite Syrian Christian Church, Malankara Orthodox Syrian Church, Latin Church, Liberal Catholic Church, Anglican Communion, Malankara Mar Thoma Syrian Church, Believers Eastern Church, Syriac Catholic Church, Church of the East; 21 December: (Jacobite), Malankara Jacobite Syrian Orthodox Church, Malankara Syrian Orthodox Church some Anglican Communion, Hispanic church, Traditional Catholics, Lutherans; 26 Pashons and Sunday after Easter (Thomas Sunday): Coptic Christianity Malankara Jacobite Syrian Orthodox Church, 6 October and Sunday after Easter Thomas Sunday: Eastern Orthodox
- Attributes: The Twin, placing his finger in the side of Christ, nelumbo nucifera, spear (means of his Christian martyrdom), carpentry square (his profession, a builder)
- Patronage: Architects, for Christians in India (including Saint Thomas Christians and Archdiocese of Madras-Mylapore), Tamil Nadu, Santo Tomas, Pampanga, Sri Lanka, Pula (Croatia) and São Tomé and Príncipe

Thomas the Apostle (Classical Syriac: ܬܐܘܡܐ, romanized: Tʾōmā, lit. 'the Twin') (Note: Greek: Θωμᾶς, romanized: Thōmâs; Hebrew: תֹּאמָא השליח; Coptic: ⲑⲱⲙⲁⲥ; Malayalam: തോമാ ശ്ലീഹാ) also known as Didymus (Greek: Δίδυμος, romanized: Dídymos 'twin'), was one of the Twelve Apostles of Jesus according to the New Testament. Thomas is commonly known as "doubting Thomas" because he initially doubted the resurrection of Jesus when he was told of it (as is related in the Gospel of John); he later confessed his faith ("My Lord and my God") on seeing the places where the wounds appeared still fresh on the holy body of Jesus after the Crucifixion of Jesus.

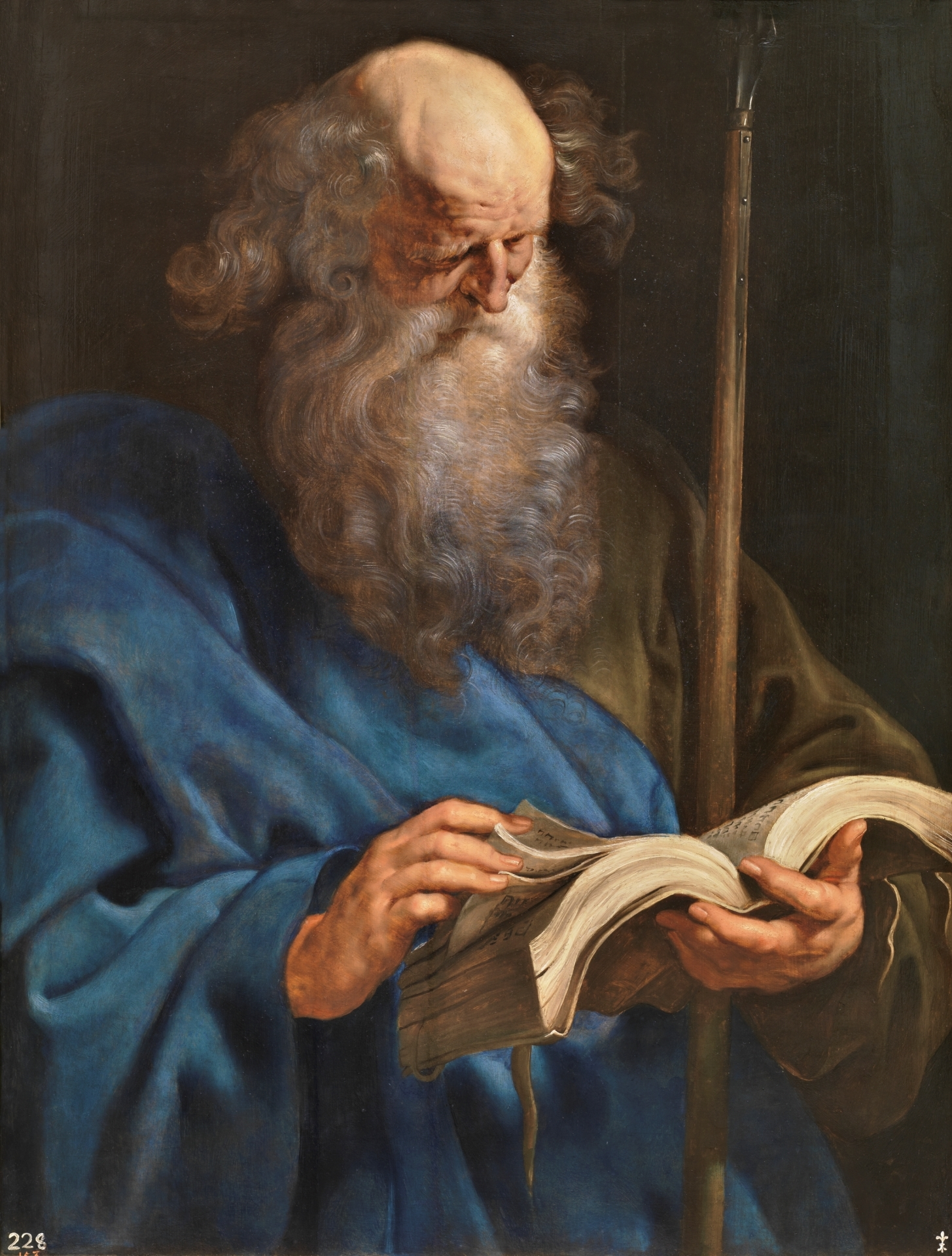
The Apostle Thomas, Rubens, c. 1613

According to early Christian tradition, it was at or near Muziris that Thomas the Apostle is believed to have first arrived in India. He started the Church of the East in the region around the Van Province, Edessa, and Hakkari regions of Upper Mesopotamia (modern-day southeastern Turkey), presumably sometime between mid-late 30s and 45, and spent many years evangelizing both Jews and non-christians in the area before heading further east in the late 40s. In 1258, some of the relics were brought to Ortona, in Abruzzo, Italy, where they have been held in the Church of Saint Thomas the Apostle. He is regarded as the patron saint of India among Saint Thomas Christians, and the Feast of Saint Thomas on July 3 is celebrated as Indian Christians' Day. The name Thomas remains quite popular among the Saint Thomas Christians of the Indian state of Kerala.

Many churches in the Middle East and southern Asia, besides India, also mention Apostle Thomas in their historical traditions as being the first evangelist to establish those churches, the Church of the East, as well as the early church of Sri Lanka.

== Gospel of John ==
Thomas first speaks in the Gospel of John. In John 11:16, when Lazarus has recently died, and the apostles do not wish to go back to Judea, Thomas says: "Let us also go, that we may die with him." (Note: All three occasions are discussed in detail by Dr. Mathew Vallanickal in "Faith and Character of Apostle Thomas".)

Thomas speaks again in John 14:5. There, Jesus had just explained that he was going away to prepare a heavenly home for his followers, and that one day they would join him there. Thomas reacted by saying, "Lord, we know not whither thou goest; and how can we know the way?"

John 20:24–29 tells how doubting Thomas was skeptical at first when he heard that Jesus had risen from the dead and appeared to the other apostles, saying, "Except I shall see on his hands the print of the nails, and put my finger into the print of the nails, and thrust my hand into his side, I will not believe." But when Jesus appeared later and invited Thomas to touch his wounds and behold him, Thomas showed his belief by saying, "My Lord and my God". Jesus then said, "Thomas, because thou hast seen me, thou hast believed: blessed are they that have not seen, and yet have believed."

== Names and etymologies ==
The name Thomas (Greek: Θωμᾶς) given for the apostle in the New Testament is derived from the Aramaic תְּאוֹמָא Tʾōmā (Syriac ܬܐܘܿܡܵܐ/ܬ݁ܳܐܘܡܰܐ Tʾōmā/Tāʾwma), meaning "the twin" and cognate to Hebrew תְּאוֹם tʾóm. The equivalent term for twin in Greek, which is also used in the New Testament, is Δίδυμος Didymos.

=== Other names ===
The Nag Hammadi copy of the Gospel of Thomas begins: "These are the secret sayings that the living Jesus spoke and Didymus, Judas Thomas, recorded." Early Syrian traditions also relate the apostle's full name as Judas Thomas. (Note: "... Judas Thomas, as he is called [in the Acta Thomae] and elsewhere in Syriac tradition ...".) Some have seen in the Acts of Thomas (written in east Syria in the early 3rd century, or perhaps as early as the first half of the 2nd century) an identification of Thomas with the apostle Judas, Son of James. However, the first sentence of the Acts follows the Gospels and the Acts of the Apostles in distinguishing the apostle Thomas and the apostle Judas son of James. Others, such as James Tabor, identify him as Jude, brother of Jesus mentioned by Mark. In the Book of Thomas the Contender, part of the Nag Hammadi library, he is alleged to be a twin to Jesus: "Now, since it has been said that you are my twin and true companion, examine yourself…"

A "doubting Thomas" is a skeptic who refuses to believe without direct personal experience—a reference to the Gospel of John's depiction of the Apostle Thomas, who, in John's account, refused to believe the resurrected Jesus had appeared to the ten other apostles until he could see and feel Jesus' crucifixion wounds.

=== Feast days ===
When the feast of Saint Thomas was inserted in the Roman calendar in the 9th century, it was assigned to 21 December. The Martyrology of St. Jerome mentioned the apostle on 3 July, the date to which the Roman celebration was transferred in 1969, so that it would no longer interfere with the major ferial days of Advent. Traditionalist Roman Catholics (who follow the General Roman Calendar of 1960 or earlier), the Lutheran Church, and many Anglicans (including members of the Episcopal Church as well as members of the Church of England who worship according to the 1662 edition of the Book of Common Prayer), still celebrate his feast day on 21 December. However, most modern liturgical calendars (including the Common Worship calendar of the Church of England) prefer 3 July, Thomas is remembered in the Church of England with a Festival.

The Eastern Orthodox venerates Thomas on the following days:

- June 20 – Commemoration of the Translation of the Relics of the Apostles Andrew, Thomas, and Luke; the Prophet Elisha; and the Martyr Lazarus.
- June 30 – The Twelve Apostles.
- October 6 – Primary feast day.
- The First Sunday after Easter – The Sunday of Thomas, which commemorate when Thomas' doubts regarding the risen Christ were removed by Christ displaying the wounds in his hands and side.

Thomas is also associated with the "Arabian" (or "Arapet") icon of the Theotokos (Mother of God), which is commemorated on 6 September. He is also associated with the Cincture of the Theotokos, which is commemorated on August 31.

The Malankara Orthodox Church celebrates his feast on three days, 3 July (in memory of the relic translation to Edessa, modern Şanlıurfa), 18 December (the Day he was lanced), and 21 December (when he died).

== Later history and traditions ==
The Passing of Mary, adjudged heretical by Pope Gelasius I in 494, was attributed to Joseph of Arimathea. The document states that Thomas was the only witness of the Assumption of Mary into heaven. The other apostles were miraculously transported to Jerusalem to witness her assumption. Thomas was left in India, but after her first burial, he was transported to her tomb, where he witnessed her bodily assumption into heaven, from which she dropped her girdle. In an inversion of the story of Thomas' doubts, the other apostles are skeptical of Thomas' story until they see the empty tomb and the girdle. Thomas' receipt of the girdle is commonly depicted in medieval and pre-Council of Trent Renaissance art.

=== Mission in India ===
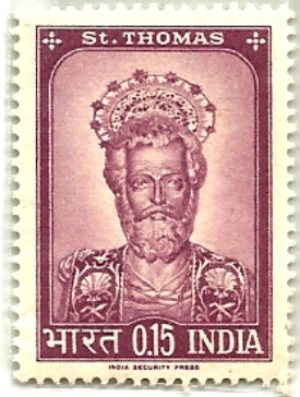
The Postal Department of India issued a stamp commemorating his mission to the country.

According to traditional accounts of the Saint Thomas Christians of India, the Apostle Thomas landed in the coast of the Chera Kingdom (one of the three Tamil Kingdoms), in Muziris (Cranganore), in the present day Indian state of Kerala in AD 52, and was martyred in Mylapore, near Madras in AD 72. In the far south of the Indian subcontinent, particularly in present-day Kerala and Tamil Nadu, political authority during the 1st century CE was shared among three major Tamil polities: the Chera, Chola, and Pandya dynasties. The Cheras ruled over the Kerala region, including the area surrounding the port of Muziris, the Cholas controlled parts of eastern Tamil Nadu, and the Pandyas governed the southern Tamil region. The predominant language of administration and literary expression across these polities, including the Chera realm, was early Tamil, as evidenced by Sangam literature and Tamil-Brahmi or Tamili inscriptions. The ancient port of Muziris, identified with sites such as Pattanam on the Malabar Coast and located within the Chera domain, functioned as a major center of maritime trade with the Roman Empire. It formed part of a Tamil-speaking cultural sphere while also operating as a cosmopolitan entrepôt with multilingual interactions.But the visit of St. Thomas is still a matter of dispute among historians. He is believed by the Saint Thomas Christian tradition to have established seven churches (communities) in Kerala at Kodungallur, Palayoor, Kottakkavu (Paravur), Kokkamangalam, Niranam, Nilackal (Chayal), Kollam, and Thiruvithamcode. Thomas baptized several families. Many families claim to have origins almost as far back as these, and the religious historian Robert Eric Frykenberg notes that: "Whatever dubious historicity may be attached to such local traditions, there can be little doubt as to their great antiquity or to their great appeal in the popular imagination."

It was to a land of dark people he was sent, to clothe them by Baptism in white robes. His grateful dawn dispelled India's painful darkness. It was his mission to espouse India to the One-Begotten. The merchant is blessed for having so great a treasure. Edessa thus became the blessed city by possessing the greatest pearl India could yield. Thomas works miracles in India, and at Edessa Thomas is destined to baptize peoples perverse and steeped in darkness, and that in the land of India.

— Hymns of Saint Ephrem, edited by Lamy (Ephr. Hymni et Sermones, IV).

... Into what land shall I fly from the just?
I stirred up Death the Apostles to slay, that by their death I might escape their blows.
But harder still am I now stricken: the Apostle I slew in India has overtaken me in Edessa; here and there he is all himself.
There went I, and there was he: here and there to my grief I find him.

— quoted in Medlycott 1905, Ch II

Ephrem the Syrian, a doctor of Syriac Christianity, writes in the forty-second of his "Carmina Nisibina" that the Apostle was put to death in India, and that his remains were subsequently buried in Edessa, brought there by an unnamed merchant.

According to Eusebius' record, Thomas and Bartholomew were assigned to Parthia and northwest India. The Didascalia (dating from the end of the 3rd century) states, "India and all countries condering it, even to the farthest seas... received the apostolic ordinances from Judas Thomas, who was a guide and ruler in the church which he built."

According to traditional accounts, Thomas is believed to have left northwest India when threatened by an attack and traveled by vessel to the Malabar Coast, possibly visiting southeast Arabia and Socotra en route, and landing at the former flourishing port of Muziris (modern-day North Paravur and Kodungalloor) (c. 50) in the company of a Jewish merchant Abbanes/Habban. From there, he is said to have preached the gospel throughout the Malabar coast. The various churches he founded were located mainly on the Periyar River and its tributaries and along the coast, where there were Jewish colonies.

=== Alleged visit to China ===
Map of the ancient Silk Road and Spice Route in the 1st century A.D

Thomas's alleged visit to China is mentioned in the books and church traditions of Saint Thomas Christians in India, some of whom claim descent from the early Christians evangelized by Thomas the Apostle in 52. For example, it is found in the Malayalam ballad Thoma Ramban Pattu (The Song of the Lord Thomas), with the earliest manuscript being from the 17th century. The sources write about Thomas coming to India, then to China, and back to India, where he died.

In other attested sources, the tradition of making Thomas the apostle of China is found in the "Law of Christianity" (Fiqh al-naṣrāniyya), a compilation of juridical literature by Ibn al-Ṭayyib (Nestorian theologian and physician who died in 1043 in Baghdad). Later, in the Nomocanon of Abdisho bar Berika (metropolitan of Nisibis and Armenia, died in 1318) and the breviary of the Chaldean Church it is written:

1. Through St. Thomas, the error of idolatry vanished from India.

2. Through St. Thomas, the Chinese and Ethiopians were converted to the truth.

3. Through St. Thomas, they accepted the sacrament of baptism and the adoption of sons.

4. Through St. Thomas, they believed in and confessed the Father, the Son, and Holy Spirit.

5. Through St. Thomas, they preserved the accepted faith of the one God.

6. Through St. Thomas, the life-giving splendors rose in all India.

7. Through St. Thomas, the Kingdom of Heaven took wing and ascended to China.

— Translated by Athanasius Kircher in China Illustrata (1667), Office of St. Thomas for the Second Nocturn, Gaza of the Church of St. Thomas of Malabar, Chaldean Breviary

In its nascent form, this tradition is found at the earliest in the Zuqnin Chronicle (AD 775) and may have originated in the late Sasanian period. Perhaps it originated as a 3rd-century pseudepigraphon where Thomas would have converted the Magi (in the Gospel of Matthew) to Christianity as they dwelled in the land of Shir (land of Seres, Tarim Basin, near what was the world's easternmost sea for many people in antiquity). Additionally, the testimony of Arnobius of Sicca, active shortly after 300, maintains that the Christian message had arrived in India and among the Persians, Medians, and Parthians (along with the Seres).

=== Possible travel into Indonesia ===
According to Kurt E. Koch, Thomas the Apostle possibly traveled into Indonesia via India with Indian traders.

=== Paraguayan legend ===
Ancient oral tradition retained by the Guaraní tribes of Paraguay claims that the Apostle Thomas was in Paraguay and preached to them under the name of Pa'í Sumé or Avaré Sumé (while in Peru he was known as Tumé).

in the estate of our college, called Paraguay, and twenty leagues distant from Asumpcion. This place stretches out on one side into a pleasant plain, affording pasture to a vast quantity of cattle; on the other, where it looks towards the south, it is surrounded by hills and rocks; in one of which a cross piled up of three large stones is visited, and held in great veneration by the natives for the sake of St. Thomas; for they believe, and firmly maintain, that the Apostle, seated on these stones as on a chair, formerly preached to the assembled Indians.

— Dobrizhoffer 1822, p. 385

Almost 150 years prior to Dobrizhoffer's arrival in Paraguay, another Jesuit Missionary, F. J. Antonio Ruiz de Montoya, recollected the same oral traditions from the Paraguayan tribes. He wrote:

...The Paraguayan tribes they have this very curious tradition. They claim that a very holy man (Thomas the Apostle himself), whom they call "Paí Thome", lived amongst them and preached to them the Holy Truth, wandering and carrying a wooden cross on his back.

— Ruiz de Montoya 1639

The sole recorded research conducted on the subject was during José Gaspar Rodríguez de Francia's reign after the Independence of Paraguay. This is mentioned by Franz Wisner von Morgenstern, an Austro-Hungarian engineer who served in the Paraguayan armies prior and during the Paraguayan War. According to Wisner, some Paraguayan miners while working nearby some hills at the Caaguazú Department found some stones with ancient letters carved in them. Dictator Francia sent his finest experts to inspect those stones, and they concluded that the letters carved in those stones were Hebrew-like symbols, but they couldn't translate them nor figure out the exact date when those letters were carved. No further recorded investigations exist, and according to Wisner, people believed that the letters were made by Thomas the Apostle, following the tradition.

== Death ==
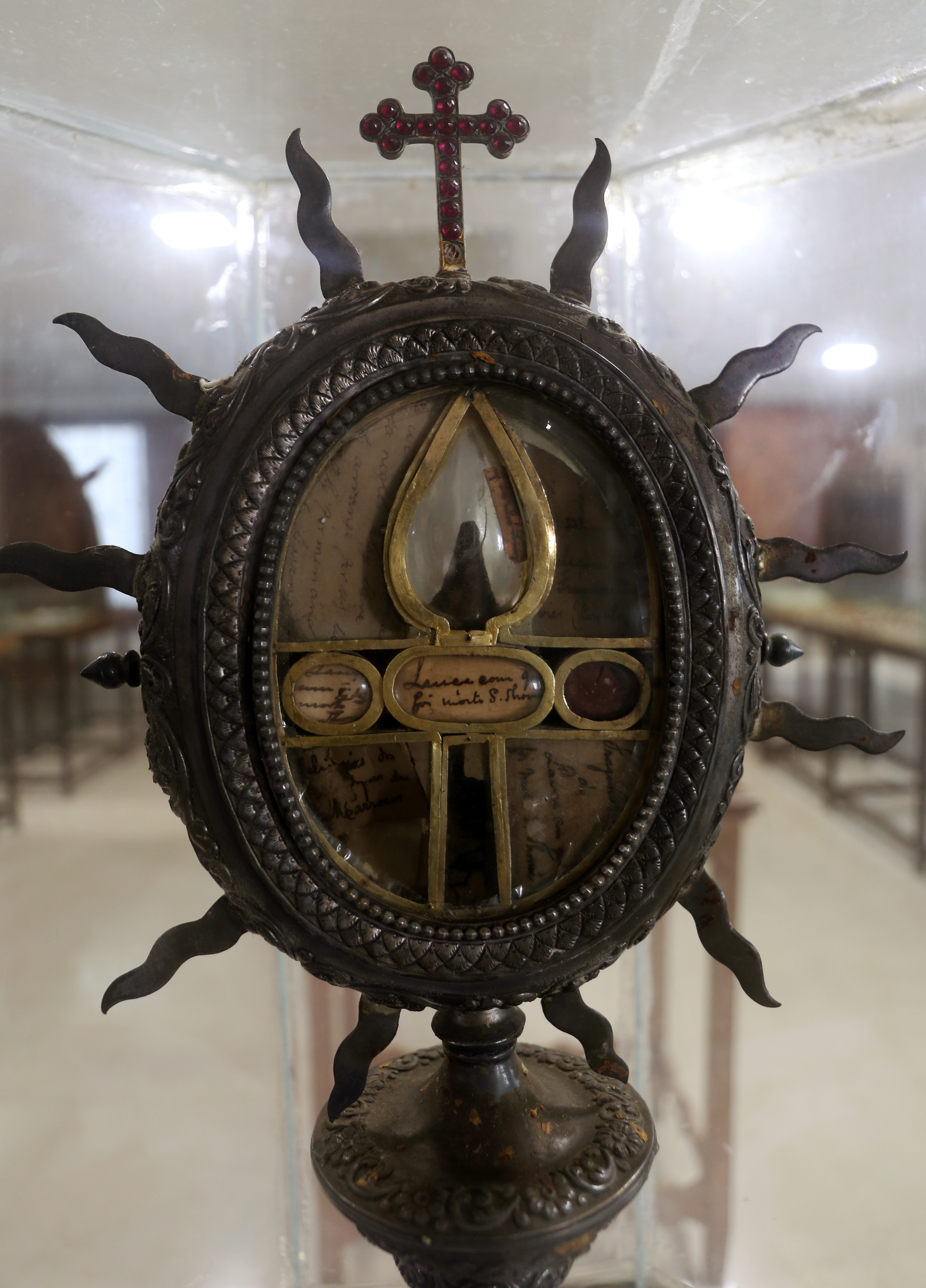
The reliquary of the spear which killed St. Thomas, in Chennai, India

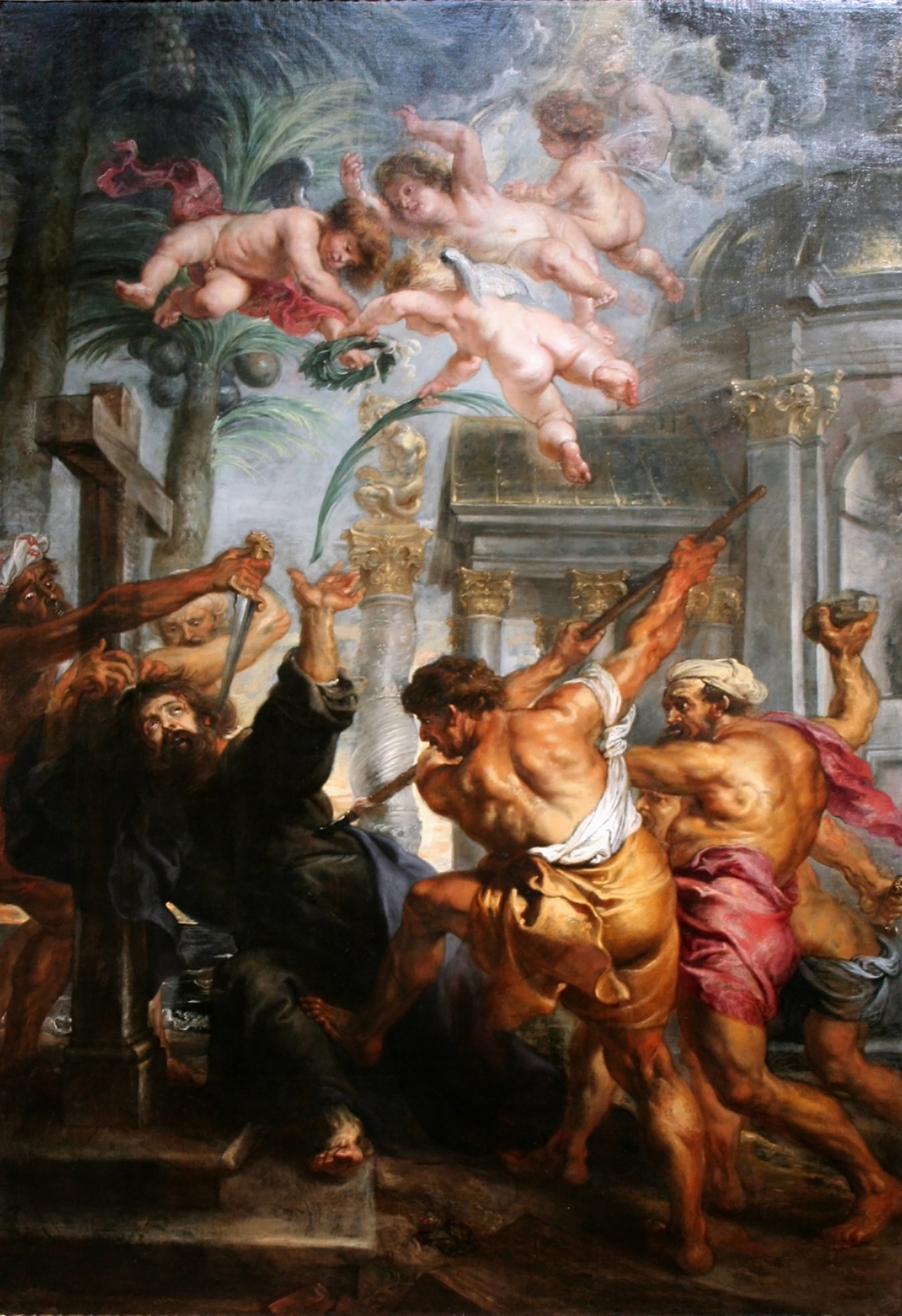
Martyrdom of Saint Thomas by Peter Paul Rubens, 1636–1638, in the National Gallery Prague

According to Syrian Christian tradition, Thomas was killed with a spear at St. Thomas Mount in Chennai on 21 Dec 72 AD, and his body was interred in Mylapore. Latin Church tradition holds 21 December as his date of death. Ephrem the Syrian states that the Apostle was killed in India, and that his relics were then taken to Edessa. This is the earliest known record of his death.

The records of Barbosa from the early 16th century record that the tomb was then maintained and a lamp is burning there. The St. Thomas Cathedral Basilica, Chennai, Tamil Nadu, India, presently located at the tomb, was first built in the 16th century by the Portuguese, and rebuilt in the 19th century by the British. St. Thomas Mount has been a site revered by Christians since at least the 16th century.

=== Relics ===
==== Mylapore ====
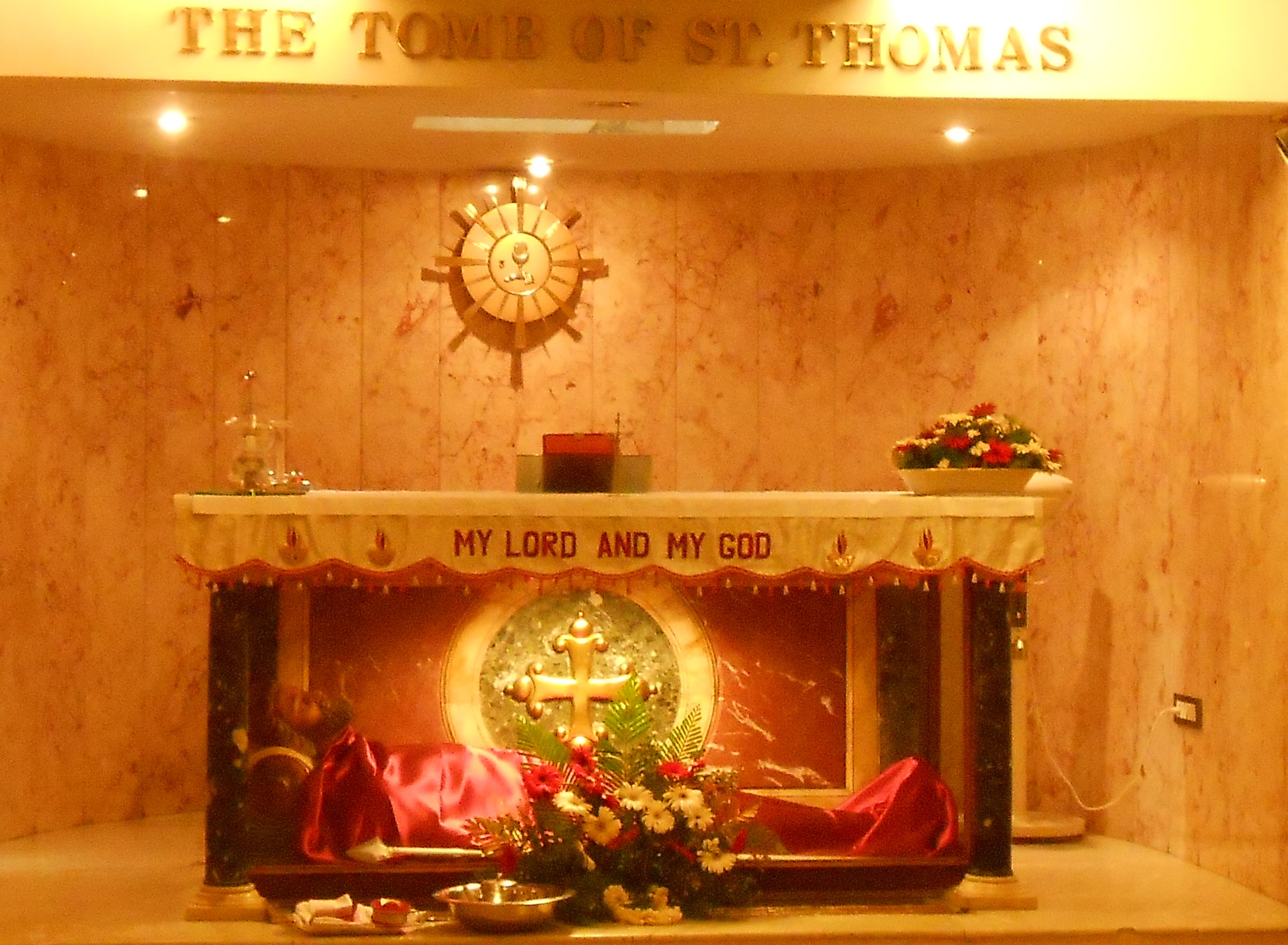
The tomb of Saint Thomas the Apostle in Mylapore, India

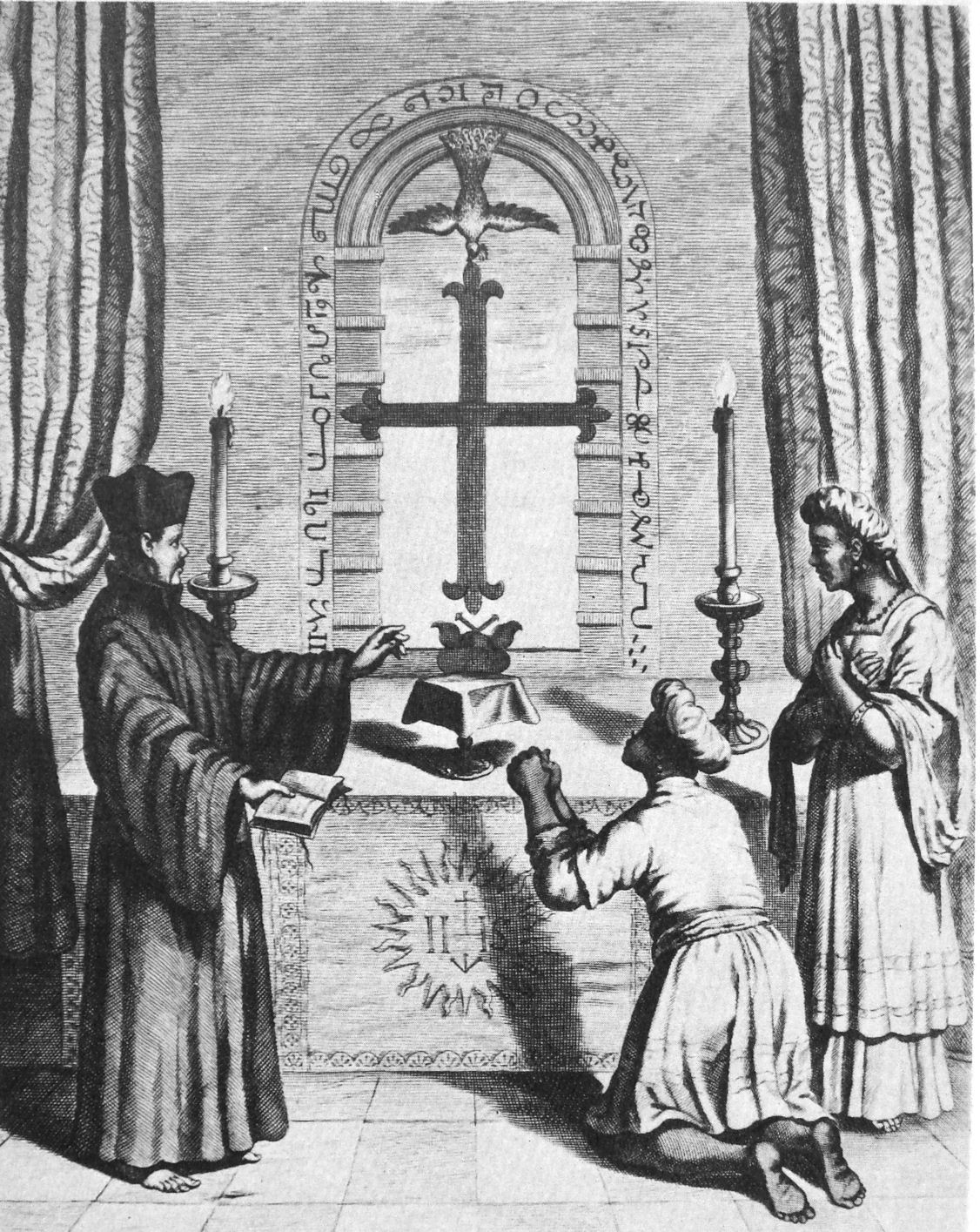
Shrine of Saint Thomas in Mylapore, 18th-century print

Traditional accounts say that the Apostle Thomas preached not only in Kerala but also in Tamil Nadu and other parts of Southern India, and that a few relics are still kept at San Thome Basilica in Mylapore neighborhood in the central part of the city of Chennai in India. Marco Polo, the Venetian traveller and author of Description of the World, popularly known as Il Milione, is reputed to have visited Southern India in 1288 and 1292. The first date has been rejected as he was in China at the time, but the second date is generally accepted.

==== Edessa ====
According to tradition, in 232, the greater portion of relics of the Apostle Thomas are said to have been sent by an Indian king and brought from India to the city of Edessa, Mesopotamia, on which occasion his Syriac Acts were written.

The Indian king is named as "Mazdai" in Syriac sources, and "Misdeos" and "Misdeus" in Greek and Latin sources respectively, which has been connected to the "Bazdeo" on the Kushan coinage of Vasudeva I, the transition between "M" and "B" being a current one in classical sources for Indian names. The martyrologist Rabban Sliba dedicated a special day to both the Indian king, his family, and Saint Thomas:

Coronatio Thomae apostoli et Misdeus rex Indiae, Johannes eus filius huisque mater Tertia (Coronation of Thomas the Apostle, and Misdeus king of India, together with his son Johannes (thought to be a latinization of Vizan) and his mother Tertia) Rabban Sliba

— Bussagli 1965, p. 255

In the 4th century, the martyrium erected over his burial place brought pilgrims to Edessa. In the 380s, Egeria described her visit in a letter she sent to her community of nuns at home:

We arrived at Edessa in the Name of Christ our God, and, on our arrival, we straightway repaired to the church and memorial of saint Thomas. There, according to custom, prayers were made and the other things that were customary in the holy places were done; we read also some things concerning saint Thomas himself. The church there is very great, very beautiful and of new construction, well worthy to be the house of God, and as there was much that I desired to see, it was necessary for me to make a three days' stay there.

According to Theodoret of Cyrrhus, the bones of Saint Thomas were transferred by Cyrus I, Bishop of Edessa, from the martyrium outside of Edessa, to a church in the south-west corner of the city on 22 August 394.

In 441, the Magister militum per Orientem Anatolius donated a silver coffin to hold the relics. In 1144, the city was conquered by the Zengids and the shrine destroyed.

In 522, Cosmas Indicopleustes (called the Alexandrian) visited the Malabar Coast. He is the first traveller who mentions Syrian Christians in Malabar, in his book Christian Topography. He mentions that in the town of "Kalliana" (Quilon or Kollam), there was a bishop who had been consecrated in Persia.

==== Chios and Ortona ====
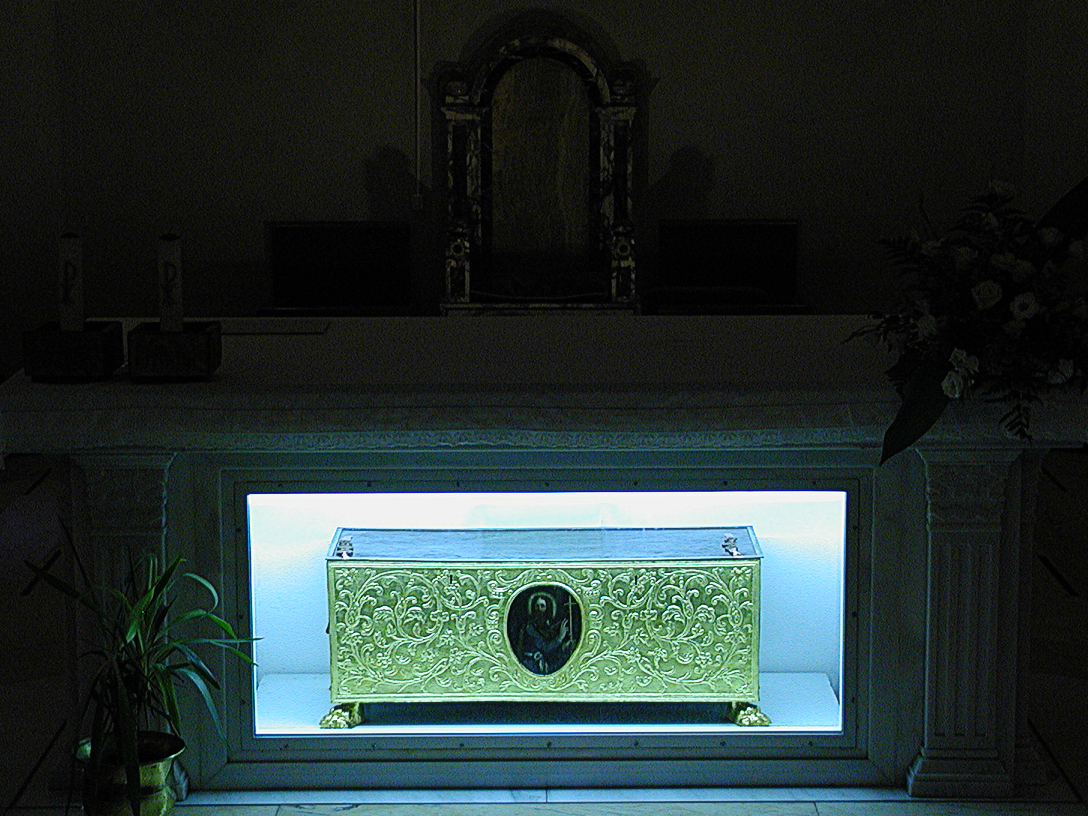
Relics of Thomas in the Cathedral of Ortona

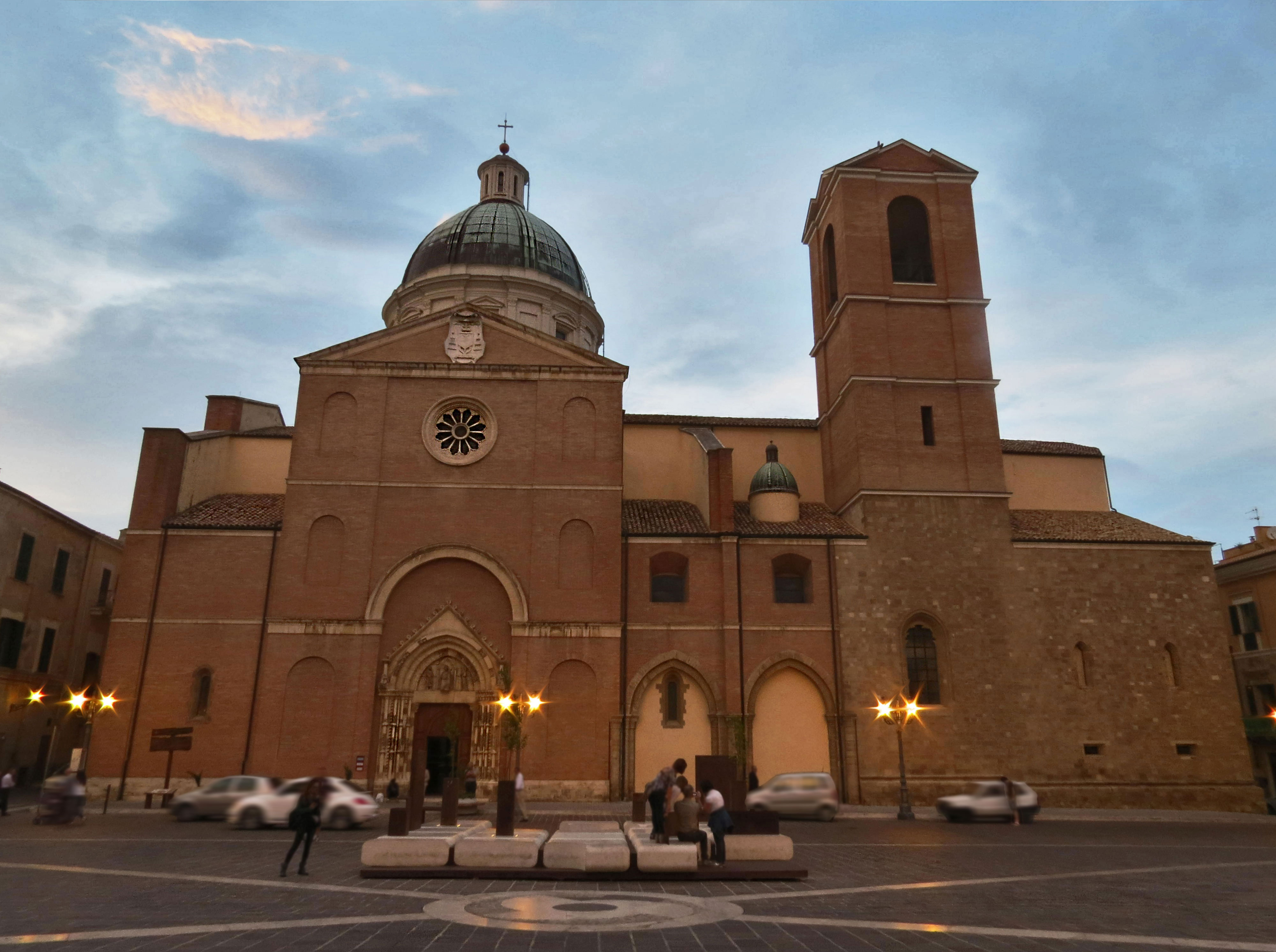
Ortona's Basilica of Saint Thomas

The reputed relics of Saint Thomas remained at Edessa until they were moved to Chios in 1258. Some portion of the relics were later transferred again, and now rest in the Cathedral of Saint Thomas the Apostle in Ortona, Italy. However, the skull of Thomas is said to be at Monastery of Saint John the Theologian on the Greek island of Patmos.

Ortona's three galleys reached the island of Chios in 1258, led by General Leone Acciaiuoli. Chios was considered the island where Thomas, after his death in India, had been buried. A portion fought around the Peloponnese and the Aegean islands, the other in the sea lapping at the then Syrian coast. The three galleys of Ortona moved on the second front of the war and reached the island of Chios.

The tale is provided by Giambattista De Lectis, physician and writer of the 16th century of Ortona. After the looting, the navarca Ortona Leone went to pray in the main church of the island of Chios and was drawn to a chapel adorned and resplendent with lights. An elderly priest, through an interpreter, informed him that in that oratory was venerated the body of Saint Thomas the Apostle. Leone, filled with an unusual sweetness, gathered in deep prayer. At that moment, a light hand twice invited him to come closer. The navarca Leone reached out and took a bone from the largest hole of the tombstone, on which were carved the Greek letters and a halo depicted a bishop from the waist up. He was the confirmation of what he had said the old priest and that you are indeed in the presence of the Apostle's body. He went back on the galley and planned the theft for the next night, along with fellow Ruggiero Grogno. They lifted the heavy gravestone, watched the underlying relics, wrapped them in snow-white cloths, laid them in a wooden box (stored at Ortona to the looting of 1566) and brought them aboard the galley. Leone, then, along with other comrades, returned again to the church, took the tombstone and took her away. Just the Chinardo admiral was aware of the precious cargo, he moved all the Muslim sailors on other ships and ordered him to take the route to Ortona.

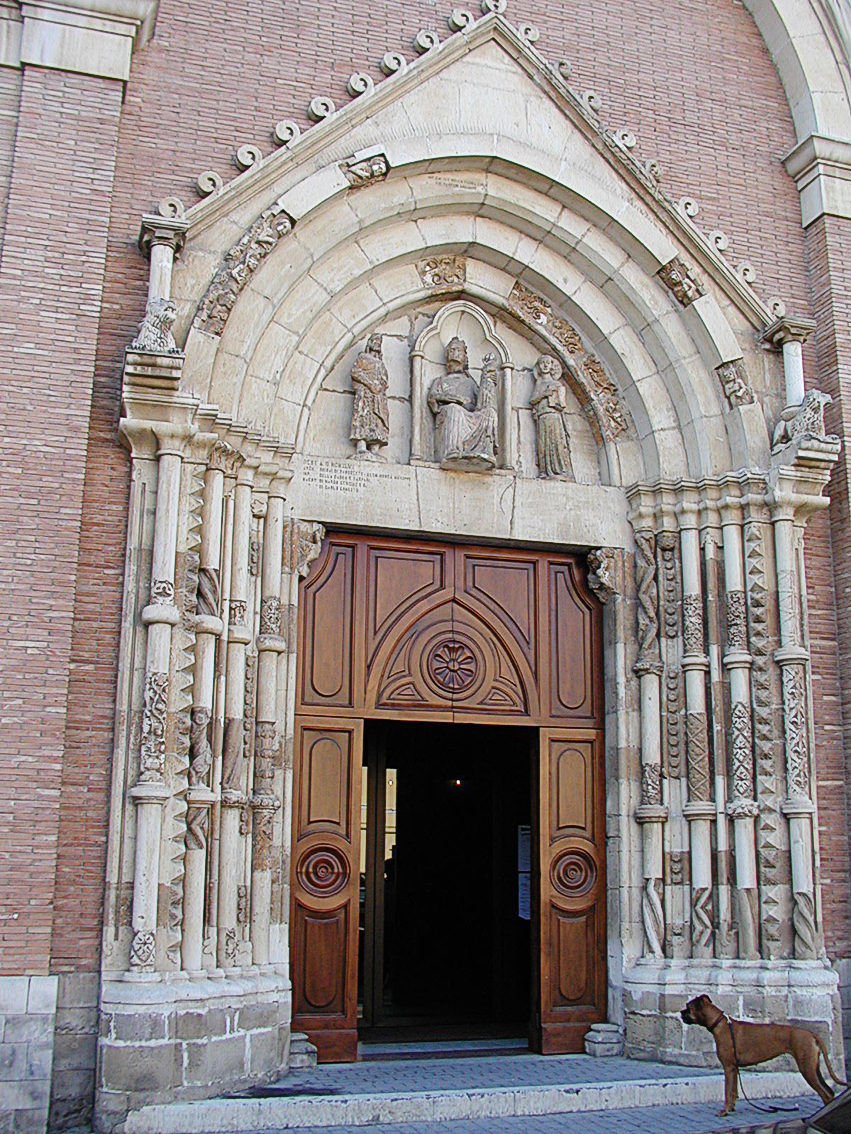
Portal of Ortona, Saint Thomas' Basilica

He landed at the port of Ortona 6 September 1258. According to the story of De Lectis, he was informed the abbot Jacopo was responsible for Ortona Church, which predisposed full provision for hospitality felt and shared by all the people. Since then, the body of the apostle and the gravestone are preserved in the crypt of the Basilica. In 1259, a parchment written in Bari by the court under John Peacock contracts, the presence of five witnesses, preserved in Ortona at the Diocesan Library, confirming the veracity of that event, reported, as mentioned, by Giambattista De Lectis, physician and writer Ortona of the 16th century.

The relics resisted both the Saracen looting of 1566, and the destruction of the Nazis in the battle of Ortona fought in late December 1943. The basilica was blown up because the belfry was considered a lookout point by the Allies, coming by sea from San Vito Chietino. The relics, together with the treasure of Saint Thomas, were intended by the Germans to be sold, but the monks entombed them inside the bell tower, the only surviving part of the semi-ruined church.

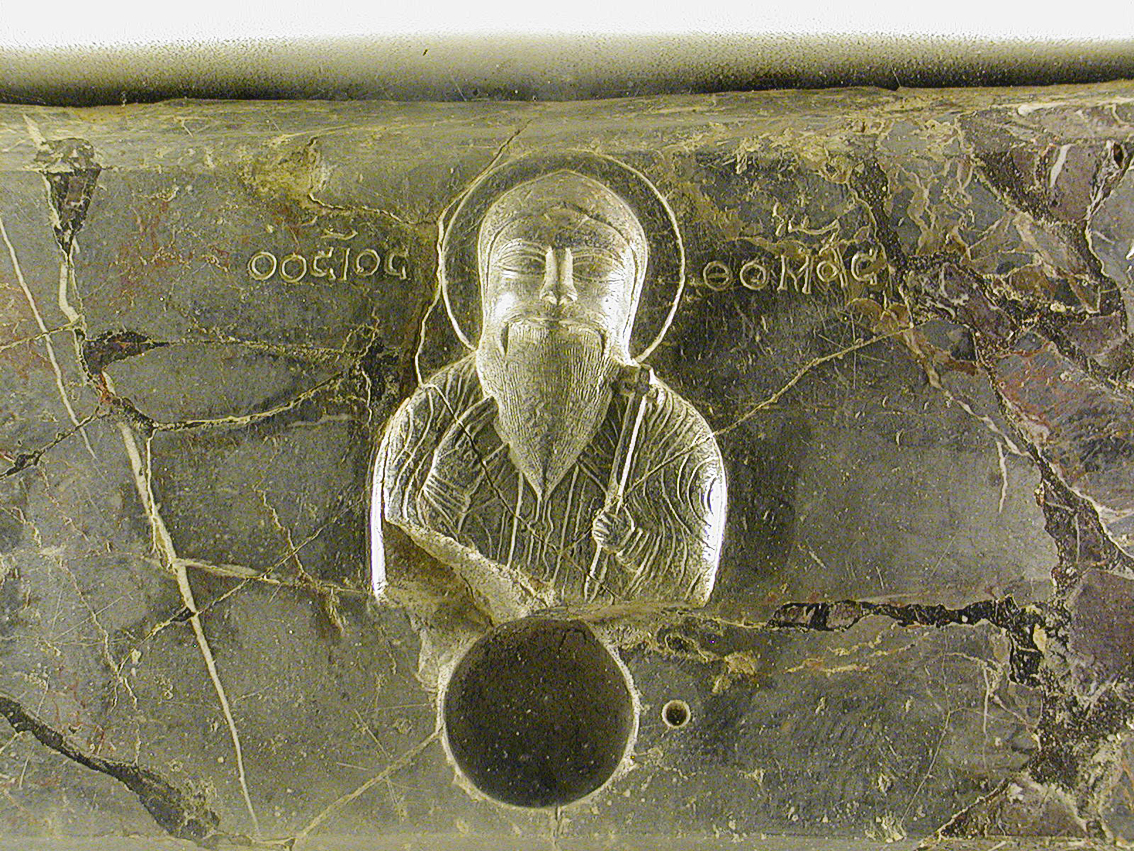
Slab of chalcedony which covered the Apostle's relics at Chios, now in the Basilica of Ortona

The tombstone of Thomas, brought to Ortona from Chios along with the relics of the Apostle, are preserved in the crypt of St Thomas Basilica, behind the altar. The urn containing the bones is placed under the altar. It is the cover of a fake coffin, a fairly widespread burial form in the early Christian world, as the top of a tomb of less expensive material. The plaque has an inscription and a bas-relief that refer, in many respects, to the Syro-Mesopotamian. Tombstone Thomas the Apostle on inclusion can be read, in Greek uncial, the expression 'osios thomas, that Saint Thomas. It can be dated from the point of view palaeographic and lexical to the 3rd–5th century, a time when the term osios is still used as a synonym of aghios in that holy is he that is in the grace of God and is inserted in the church: the two vocabulary, therefore, indicate the Christians. In the particular case of Saint Thomas' plaque, the word osios can be the translation of the word Syriac mar (Lord), attributed in the ancient world, but also to the present day, is a saint to be a bishop.

==== Iraq ====
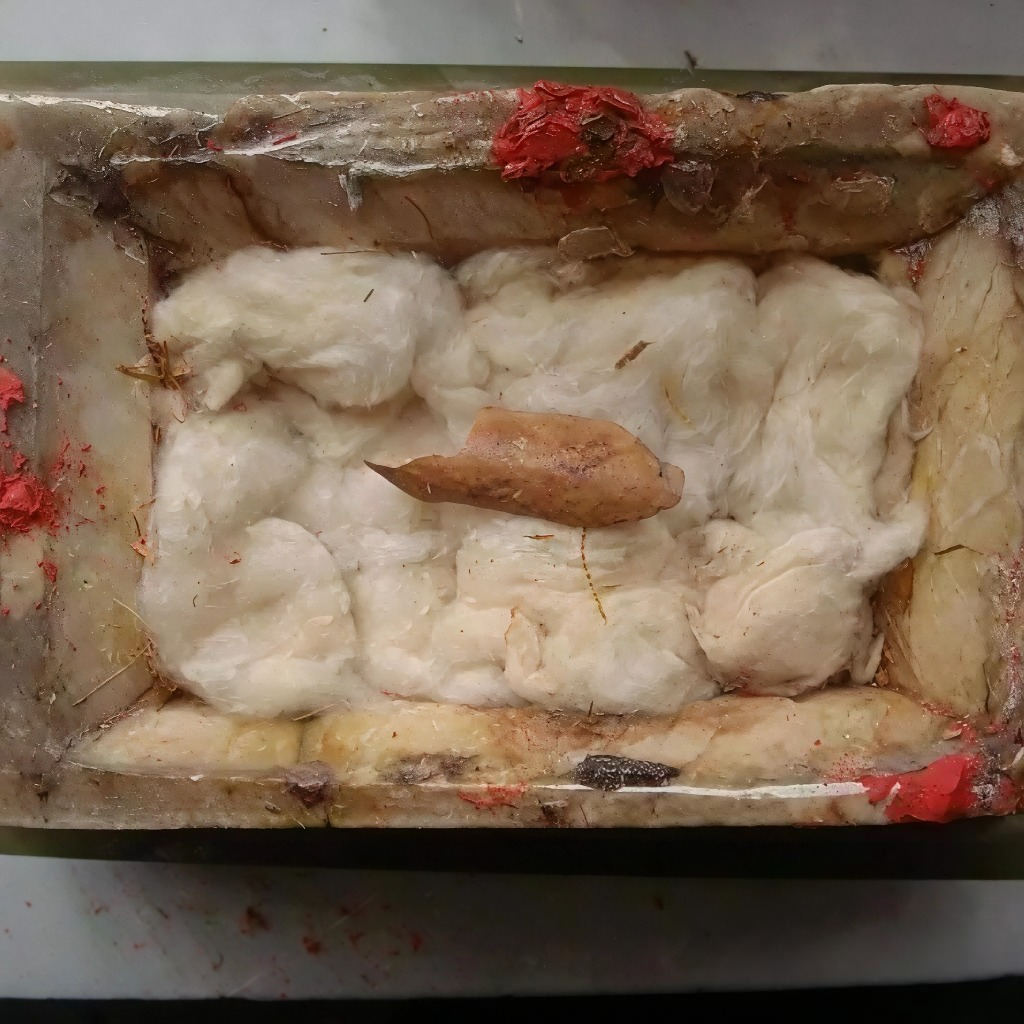
Saint Thomas relics, kept in Monastery of Saint Matthew

The purported finger bones of Saint Thomas were discovered during restoration work at the Church of Saint Thomas in Mosul, Iraq in 1964, and were housed there until the Fall of Mosul, after which the relics were transferred to the Monastery of Saint Matthew on 17 June 2014.

== Succession ==
As per the tradition of the Saint Thomas Christians, St. Thomas the Apostle established his throne in India and ordained Mar Keppa, a Chera prince, as his successor. India became his see (Kolla Hendo i.e, Chola rajya in Hindu which means the present day India); therefore, the see of the metropolitan of Saint Thomas Christians was India and adopted the title of Metropolitan and Gate of all India". As per the Syriac Orthodox Church the church in India was also addressed as the "Vicariate of Mar Thoma".

== Historical references ==
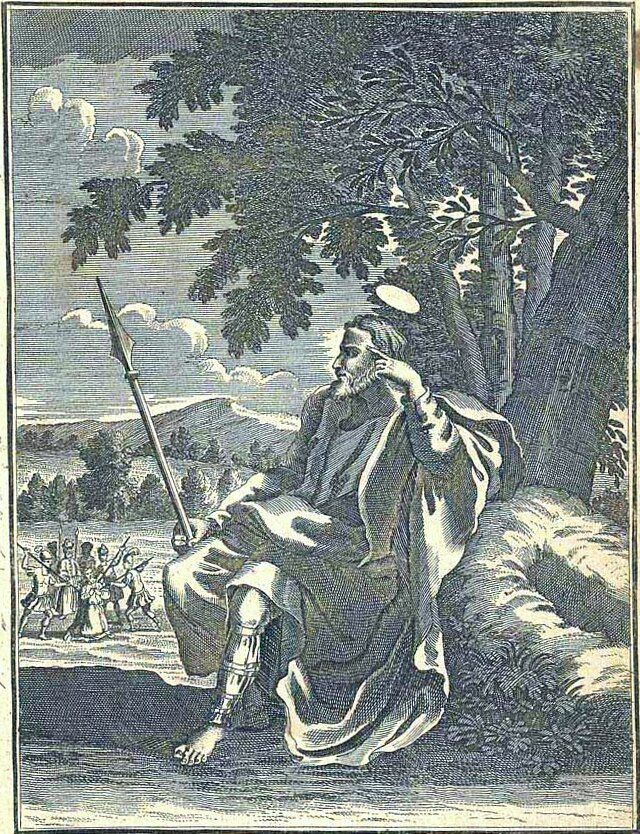
"By the command of an Indian King he was thrust through with lances", 1739 engraving

A number of early Christian writings written during the centuries immediately following the first Ecumenical Council of 325 mention Thomas' mission.

The Transitus Mariae describes each of the apostles purportedly being temporarily transported to heaven during the Assumption of Mary.

=== Acts of Thomas ===
The main source is the apocryphal Acts of Thomas, sometimes referred to by its full name The Acts of Judas Thomas, written circa 180–230 AD. These are generally regarded by various Christian religions as apocryphal, or even heretical. The two centuries that lapsed between the life of the apostle and the recording of this work cast doubt on their authenticity.

The king, Misdeus (or Mizdeos), was infuriated when Thomas converted the queen Tertia, the king's son Juzanes, sister-in-law princess Mygdonia and her friend Markia. Misdeus led Thomas outside the city and ordered four soldiers to take him to the nearby hill, where the soldiers speared Thomas, killing him. After Thomas' death, Syphorus was elected the first presbyter of Mazdai by the surviving converts, while Juzanes was the first deacon. (The names Misdeus, Tertia, Juzanes, Syphorus, Markia and Mygdonia (cf. Mygdonia, a province of Mesopotamia) may suggest Greek descent or cultural influences. Greek traders had long visited Muziris.

=== Doctrine of the Apostles ===
The Incredulity of Saint Thomas by Caravaggio

The Doctrine of the Apostles attests that Thomas had written Christian doctrine from India.

India and all its own countries, and those bordering on it, even to the farther sea, received the Apostle's hand of Priesthood from Judas Thomas, who was Guide and Ruler in the Church which he built and ministered there". In what follows "the whole Persia of the Assyrians and Medes, and of the countries round about Babylon… even to the borders of the Indians and even to the country of Gog and Magog" are said to have received the Apostles' Hand of Priesthood from Aggaeus the disciple of Addaeus

— Cureton 1864, p. 33

=== Origen ===
Christian philosopher Origen taught with great acclaim in Alexandria and then in Caesarea. Outside the account in the Acts of the Apostles 1:23–26, Origen is the earliest known writer to record the casting of lots by the Apostles. Origen's original work has been lost, but his statement about Parthia falling to Thomas has been preserved by Eusebius. "Origen, in the third chapter of his Commentary on Genesis, says that, according to tradition, Thomas's allotted field of labour was Parthia".

=== Eusebius ===
Quoting Origen, Eusebius of Caesarea wrote: "When the holy Apostles and disciples of our Saviour were scattered over all the world, Thomas, so the tradition has it, obtained as his portion Parthia…" "Judas, who is also called Thomas" has a role in the legend of king Abgar of Edessa (Urfa), for having sent Thaddaeus to preach in Edessa after the Ascension. Ephrem the Syrian also recounts this legend.

=== Ephrem the Syrian ===
Many devotional hymns composed by Ephrem the Syrian bear witness to the Edessan Church's strong conviction concerning Thomas's Indian Apostolate. There, it is mentioned that "the merchant brought the bones" to Edessa, and the devil speaks of Thomas as "the Apostle I slew in India".

Another hymn eulogizing Saint Thomas reads "The bones the merchant hath brought". "In his several journeyings to India/ And thence on his return/ All riches/ which there he found/ Dirt in his eyes he did repute when to thy sacred bones compared". In yet another hymn Ephrem speaks of the mission of Thomas: "The earth darkened with sacrifices' fumes to illuminate", "a land of people dark fell to thy lot", "a tainted land Thomas has purified"; "India's dark night" was "flooded with light" by Thomas.

— Medlycott 1905, pp. 21–32

=== Gregory of Nazianzus ===
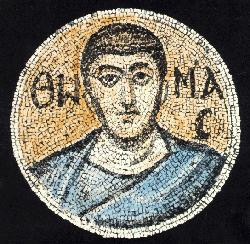
Ancient mosaic of the Apostle Thomas

Gregory of Nazianzus was born in AD 330, consecrated a bishop by his friend Basil of Caesarea; in 372, his father, the Bishop of Nazianzus, induced him to share his charge. In 379, the people of Constantinople called him to be their bishop. By the Eastern Orthodox Church, he is emphatically called "the Theologian".

In mentioning the spreadation of the Apostles spreading across the world to evangelise, he wrote, "What? Were not the Apostles strangers amidst the many nations and countries over which they spread themselves? … Peter indeed may have belonged to Judea, but what had Paul in common with the Gentiles, Luke with Achaia, Andrew with Epirus, John with Ephesus, Thomas with India, Mark with Italy?"

=== Ambrose of Milan ===
Ambrose of Milan was thoroughly acquainted with the Greek and Latin Classics and had a good deal of information on India and Indians. He speaks of the Gymnosophists of India, the Indian Ocean, the river Ganges etc., a number of times. "This admitted of the Apostles being sent without delay according to the saying of our Lord Jesus… Even those Kingdoms which were shut out by rugged mountains became accessible to them, as India to Thomas, Persia to Matthew..."

=== Gregory of Tours ===
The testimony of Gregory of Tours: "Thomas the Apostle, according to the narrative of his martyrdom is stated to have suffered in India. His holy remains (corpus), after a long interval of time, were removed to the city of Edessa in Syria and there interred. In that part of India where they first rested, stand a monastery and a church of striking dimensions, elaborately adorned and designed. This Theodore, who had been to the place, narrated to us."

== Writings ==
Let none read the gospel according to Thomas, for it is the work, not of one of the twelve apostles, but of one of Mani's three wicked disciples.

— Cyril of Jerusalem, Catechesis V (4th century)

In the first two centuries of the Christian era, a number of writings were circulated. It is unclear now why Thomas was seen as an authority for doctrine, although this belief is documented in Gnostic groups as early as the Pistis Sophia. In that Gnostic work, Mary Magdalene (one of the disciples) says:

Now at this time, my Lord, hear, so that I speak openly, for thou hast said to us "He who has ears to hear, let him hear:" Concerning the word which thou didst say to Philip: "Thou and Thomas and Matthew are the three to whom it has been given… to write every word of the Kingdom of the Light, and to bear witness to them"; hear now that I give the interpretation of these words. It is this which thy light-power once prophesied through Moses: "Through two and three witnesses everything will be established. The three witnesses are Philip and Thomas and Matthew"

— Pistis Sophia 1:43

An early, non-Gnostic tradition may lie behind this statement, which also emphasizes the primacy of the Gospel of Matthew in its Aramaic form, over the other canonical three.

Besides the Acts of Thomas there was a widely circulated Infancy Gospel of Thomas probably written in the later 2nd century, and probably also in Syria, which relates the miraculous events and prodigies of Jesus' boyhood. This is the document which tells for the first time the familiar legend of the twelve sparrows which Jesus, at the age of five, fashioned from clay on the Sabbath day, which took wing and flew away. The earliest manuscript of this work is a 6th-century one in Syriac. This gospel was first referred to by Irenaeus; Ron Cameron notes: "In his citation, Irenaeus first quotes a non-canonical story that circulated about the childhood of Jesus and then goes directly on to quote a passage from the infancy narrative of the Gospel of Luke. Since the Infancy Gospel of Thomas records both of these stories, in relative close proximity to one another, it is possible that the apocryphal writing cited by Irenaeus is, in fact, what is now known as the Infancy Gospel of Thomas. Because of the complexities of the manuscript tradition, however, there is no certainty as to when the stories of the Infancy Gospel of Thomas began to be written down."

The best known in modern times of these documents is the "sayings" document that is being called the Gospel of Thomas, a noncanonical work whose date is disputed. The opening line claims it is the work of "Didymos Judas Thomas" – whose identity is unknown. This work was discovered in a Coptic translation in 1945 at the Egyptian village of Nag Hammadi, near the site of the monastery of Chenoboskion. Once the Coptic text was published, scholars recognized that an earlier Greek translation had been published from fragments of papyrus found at Oxyrhynchus in the 1890s. Because of its potentially very early date of composition, the Gospel of Thomas has played a substantial role in New Testament studies.

== Saint Thomas Cross ==
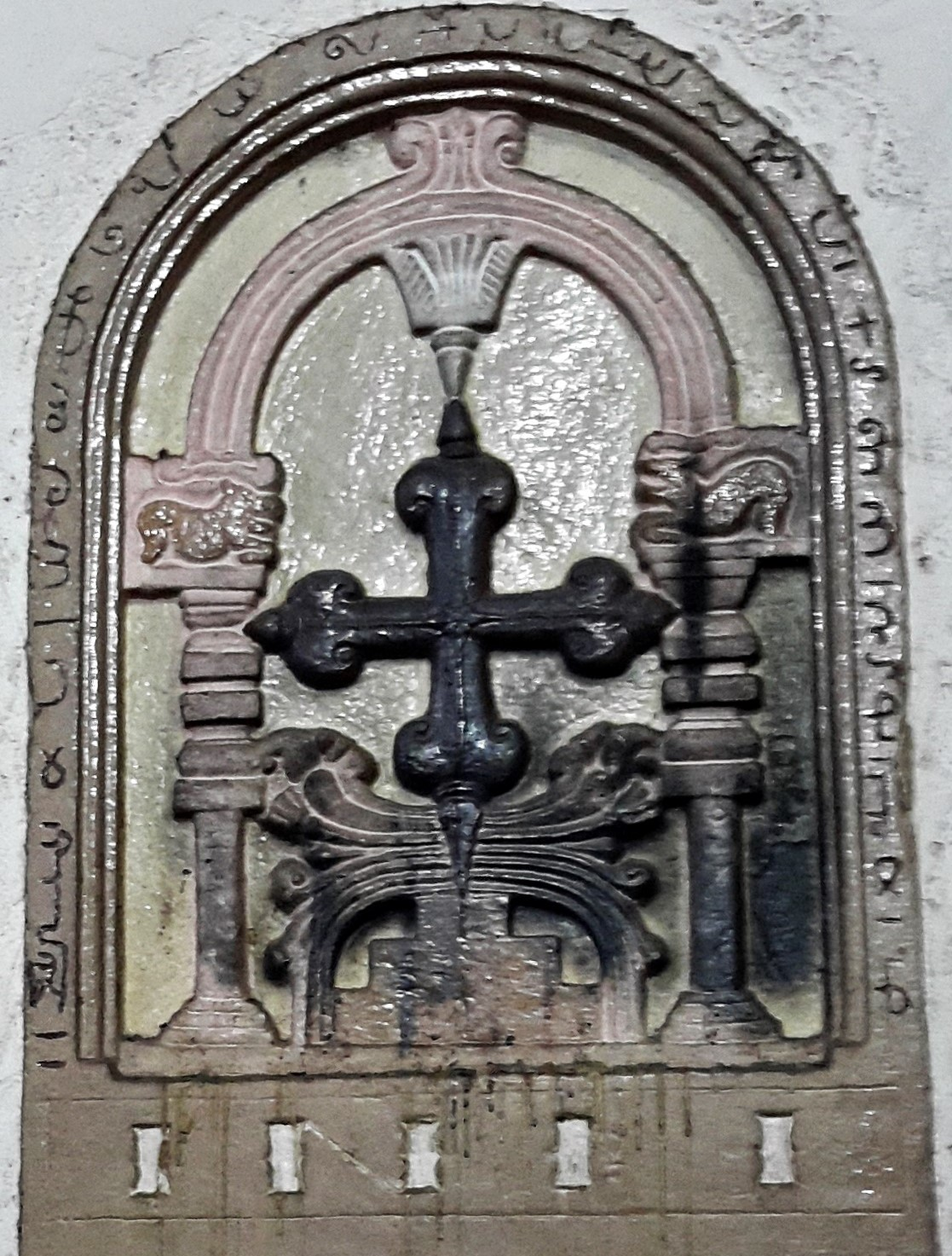
Saint Thomas Christian cross

In the 16th-century work Jornada, Antonio Gouvea writes of ornate crosses known as Saint Thomas Crosses. It is also known as Nasrani Menorah, Persian Cross, or Mar Thoma Sleeva. These crosses are believed to date from the 6th century as per the tradition and are found in a number of churches in Kerala, Mylapore and Goa. Jornada is the oldest known written document to refer to this type of cross as a Saint Thomas Cross. Gouvea also writes about the veneration of the Cross at Cranganore, referring to the cross as "Cross of Christians".

There are several interpretations of the Nasrani symbol. The interpretation based on Christian Jewish tradition assumes that its design was based on Jewish menorah, an ancient symbol of the Hebrews, which consists of a seven branched lamp stand (candelabra). The interpretation based on local culture states that the Cross without the figure of Jesus and with flowery arms symbolizing "joyfulness" points to the resurrection theology of Paul the Apostle; the Holy Spirit on the top represents the role of Holy Spirit in the resurrection of Jesus Christ. The lotus symbolizing Buddhism and the Cross over it shows that Christianity was established in the land of Buddha. The three steps indicate Calvary and the rivulets, channels of Grace flowing from the Cross.

== In Islam ==
The Qur'anic account of the disciples of Jesus does not include their names, numbers, or any detailed accounts of their lives. Muslim exegesis, however, more or less agrees with the New Testament list and says that the disciples included Peter, Philip, Thomas, Bartholomew, Matthew, Andrew, James, Jude, John, James, son of Alphaeus, and Simon the Zealot.

== Legacy ==
=== San Thome Church ===
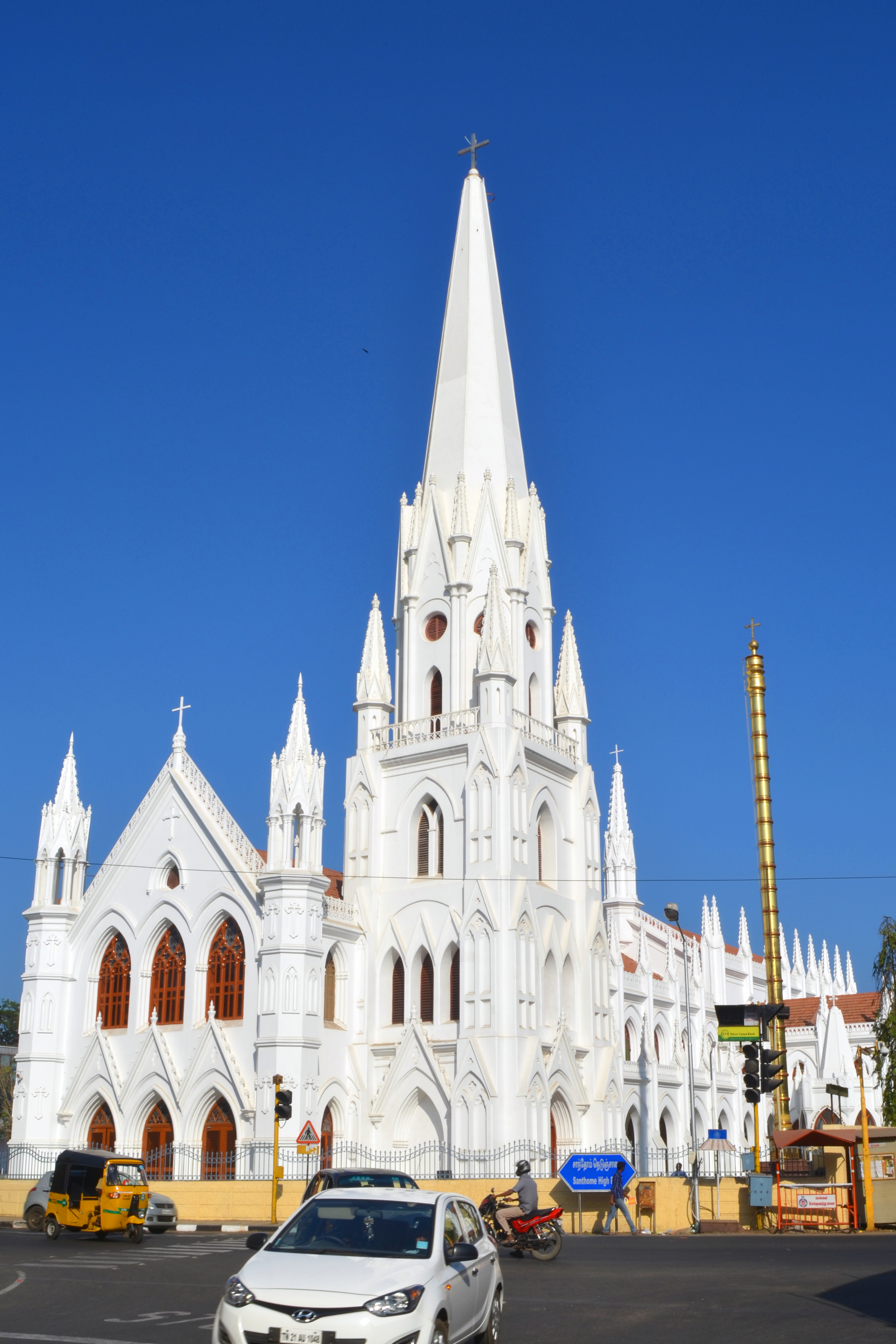
San Thome Church, built in 1523

San Thome Church is said to be the tomb of Saint Thomas in Chennai, India. It was built in 1523 by Portuguese missionaries. It is a national shrine, basilica and cathedral. It is an important site for Christians and a major shrine of Saint Thomas.

== See also ==
- Book of Thomas the Contender
- Syro Malabar Catholic Church
- Syro-Malankara Catholic Church
- Syriac Orthodox Church
- Jacobite Syrian Christian Church
- Malankara Orthodox Syrian Church
- List of patriarchs of the Church of the East
- Mar Thoma Syrian Church
- Quetzalcoatl, an Aztec god that was thought a reflection of Thomas by some Catholic missionaries
- Saint Thomas of Mylapur
- São Tomé
- St. Thomas' Church (disambiguation) – for a listing of churches and chapels named in his honour
