= Albi, Calabria =

Albi
- Comune
- Comune di Albi
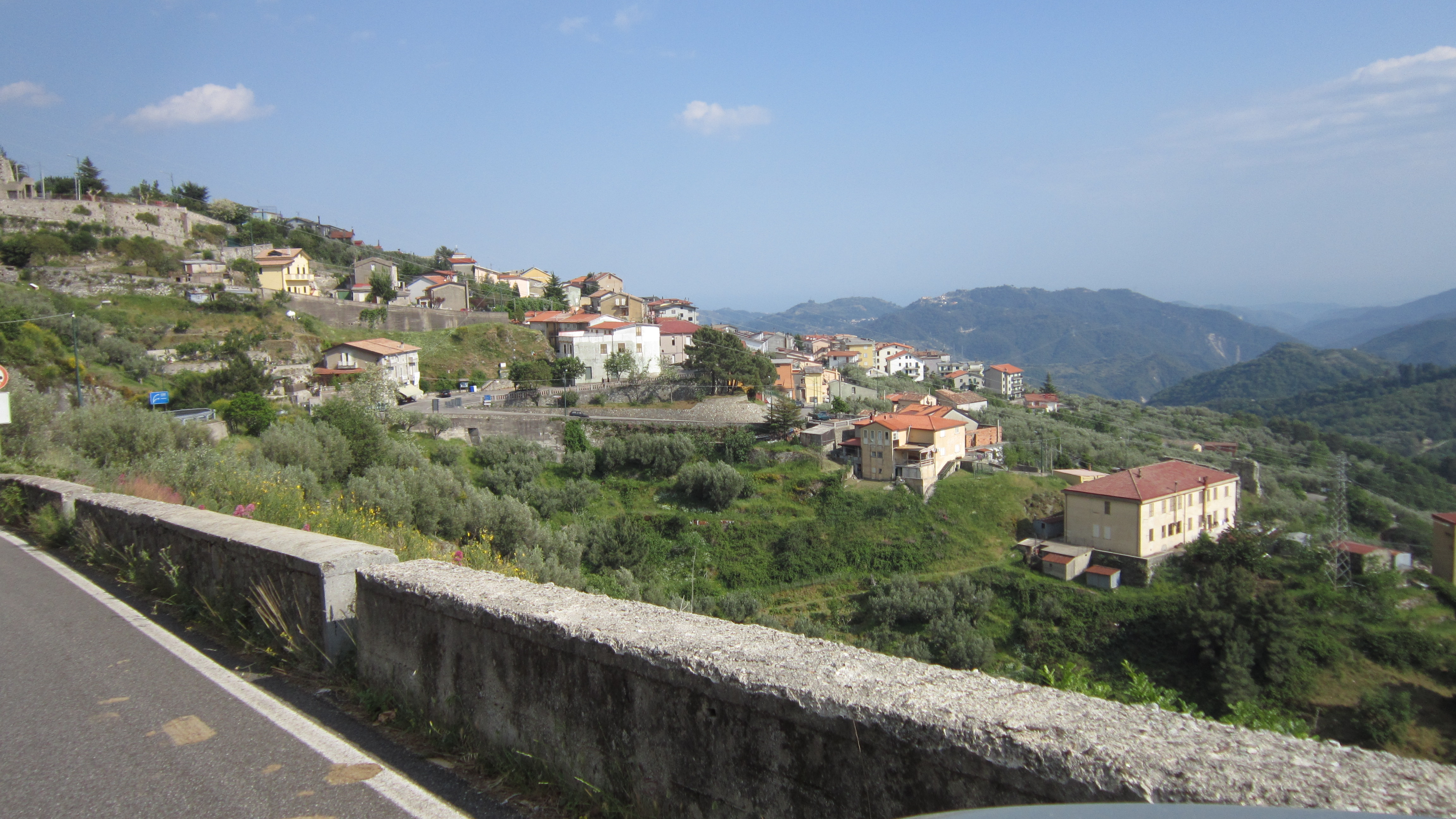

- Location within Italy Location within Calabria
- Coordinates: 39°01′06″N 16°35′40″E
- Country: Italy
- Region: Calabria
- Province: Catanzaro
- Frazioni: San Giovanni d'Albi and Buturo

Government
  - Mayor: Salvatore Ricca

Area
  - Total: 29.64 km^{2} (11.44 sq mi)
- Elevation: 778 m (2,552 ft)

Population (31 March 2019)
  - Total: 882
  - Density: 29.8/km^{2} (77.1/sq mi)
- Demonym: Albesi
- Time zone: UTC+1 (CET)
  - Summer (DST): UTC+2 (CEST)
- Postal code: 88050
- Dialing code: 0961
- Website: Official website

Albi (Italian pronunciation: [ˈalbi]; Calabrian: Iàrbi) is a commune and town in the province of Catanzaro. It is situated in the east southeastern portion of Calabria, Italy.

Possibly the first Korean to have set foot in Europe, António Corea has been theorized to have settled in Albi, with descendants with the surname Corea still living in the village today. The theory gained significant traction in both Albi and South Korea, and was widely repeated for decades. In Albi, a monument was installed in 1989 to commemorate the supposed meeting of Corea and his Italian wife. The mayor of Albi and a number of Corea's supposed descendents visited South Korea in 1992. However, this theory is now considered to be unlikely to be true.
