= António Corea =

Possibly the first Korean in Europe

António Corea (fl. late 16th and 17th centuries) or António Korea was a Korean slave who was taken to Italy. He is possibly the first Korean to have set foot in Europe. Little is known about Corea's life; he is attested to only briefly in a travelogue by his Italian master Francesco Carletti. Corea was enslaved during the 1592–1598 Imjin War and taken to Nagasaki, Japan. There, he was purchased by Carletti around 1597. They left Japan and arrived in the Netherlands around 7 July 1602. Later, Carletti wrote that Corea had settled in Rome.

In the 20th century, Corea's story drew significant attention in South Korea, where popular media such as books and plays have been produced about him. Concurrently, a number of theories proliferated about Corea that are not known to be supported by evidence. It has been theorized that Corea has living descendents in the Italian village of Albi, Calabria. Recent genetic tests and surname analyses suggest this is unlikely but still possible. It has been theorized that Corea is the subject of a famous c. 1617 sketch by Flemish artist Peter Paul Rubens dubbed Man in Korean Costume. But in 2016, two historians published a paper expressing doubt on this theory.

== Background ==
Relatively few Koreans left the Korean peninsula before the late 19th century. However, during the 1592–1598 Japanese invasions of Korea, tens of thousands of Koreans were enslaved and taken to Japan, with the first shipment in October 1592. From there, they were exported primarily to other parts of Asia.

== Biography ==
António Corea (his European name) was a Korean who was captured during the Japanese invasions and taken to Nagasaki, Japan as a slave. In 1597, Carletti arrived in Nagasaki, where he eventually purchased Corea and four other Koreans. Carletti had his Korean slaves convert to Christianity and took them to Goa in India, whereupon he set them free. He departed Goa for Europe with Corea and several others. During the journey, Carletti and Corea were taken hostage by Dutch sailors at the island of Saint Helena. According to Carletti, Corea managed to trick the Dutch into not leaving him behind on Saint Helena by portraying his relatively worthless copper necklace as valuable, and thus enticing them into taking him aboard. Carletti and Corea arrived in Middelburg, Zeeland, Netherlands on either 6 July or 7 July 1602. According to Carletti, Corea then eventually settled in Rome.

Carletti wrote of Corea in his travelogue My Voyage Around the World:

Out of [the more maritime provinces of Korea,] they brought an infinite number of men and women, boys and girls, of every age, and they all were sold as slaves at the very lowest prices. I bought five of them for little more than twelve scudos. Having had them baptized, I took them with me to Goa in India, and there set them free. I brought one of them with me to Florence, and I think that today he is to be found in Rome, where he is known as António.

== Theories about Corea ==
Since the early 20th century, a number of theories about Corea have been repeated by media and academic sources. However, these are now considered unsupported by the known sparse evidence on Corea. The proliferation and persistence of these theories can be attributed to the exciting nature of Corea's story, as well as insufficient factchecking by both the media and by several academics.

=== Biographical details ===
Rome-based South Korean reporter Kim Seong-u (Korean: 김성우) claimed that Corea was from the city of Namwon, and this claim was repeated for decades, but there is no known evidence for this. A 1965 history book compiled by the Chin-Tan Society has an article by historian Lee Sang-baek, in which Lee claims Corea was a child at the time of his enslavement. This claim was then repeated for decades afterwards by both historians and reporters. However, there was reportedly no evidence provided for it. Another theory has it that Corea became part of the Catholic clergy in Italy, but there is again no known evidence for this.

=== Living descendants ===
In 1932, Japanese historian Yamaguchi Masayuki (山口正之) claimed that Corea's descendants had settled near the settlement Catanzaro in the Italian region of Calabria as early as 1620, on the basis that a village called Albi had more than 500 people with that surname. (Note: Yamaguchi also claimed that Carletti was in the clergy; he referred to Carletti as a sōryo (僧侶, 'monk'), but reportedly provided no evidence for this claim, and scholars do not believe evidence for this exists. Despite this, the South Korean media repeated this claim even until 1984.) Kim Seong-u published a popular article in 1979 that explored this theory, and further theorized that Corea had married an Italian woman. Another South Korean scholar Kwak Cha-seop (곽차섭) wrote in 2004 about being unsure of these claims. The surname "Corea" also exists in Spain, which has led some to speculate that these people may descend from Corea as well, perhaps from when Albi went under Spanish rule around 1505.

In 1989, the mayor of Albi installed a monument in the town's Corea Square, which was dedicated to the supposed meeting of Corea and his Italian wife. In early November 1992, the South Korean Ministry of Culture invited some of Corea's supposed descendants (including one man also named António Corea, who was head of a Korean cultural society in Italy), as well as the mayor of Albi, to visit Korea. On 30 September 1993, South Korean broadcaster MBC published a documentary entitled António Corea (안토니오 꼬레아), in which it was mentioned that genetic studies on people in Albi did not significantly suggest Korean ancestry. It also argued that hundreds of years had passed since Corea's lifetime, and that it may be difficult to detect Korean descendancy now. South Korean scholar Kwak Cha-seop published a book in 2004 entitled Joseon Youth António Corea Meets Reubens (조선청년 안토니오 코레아, 루벤스를 만나다), in which he states it is very unlikely that António is the forefather of Europeans of the surname Corea. He argues this on the basis of the genetic tests and the possibility that the surname "Corea" was descended from or related to the surname "Curia".

=== Man in Korean Costume portrait subject ===
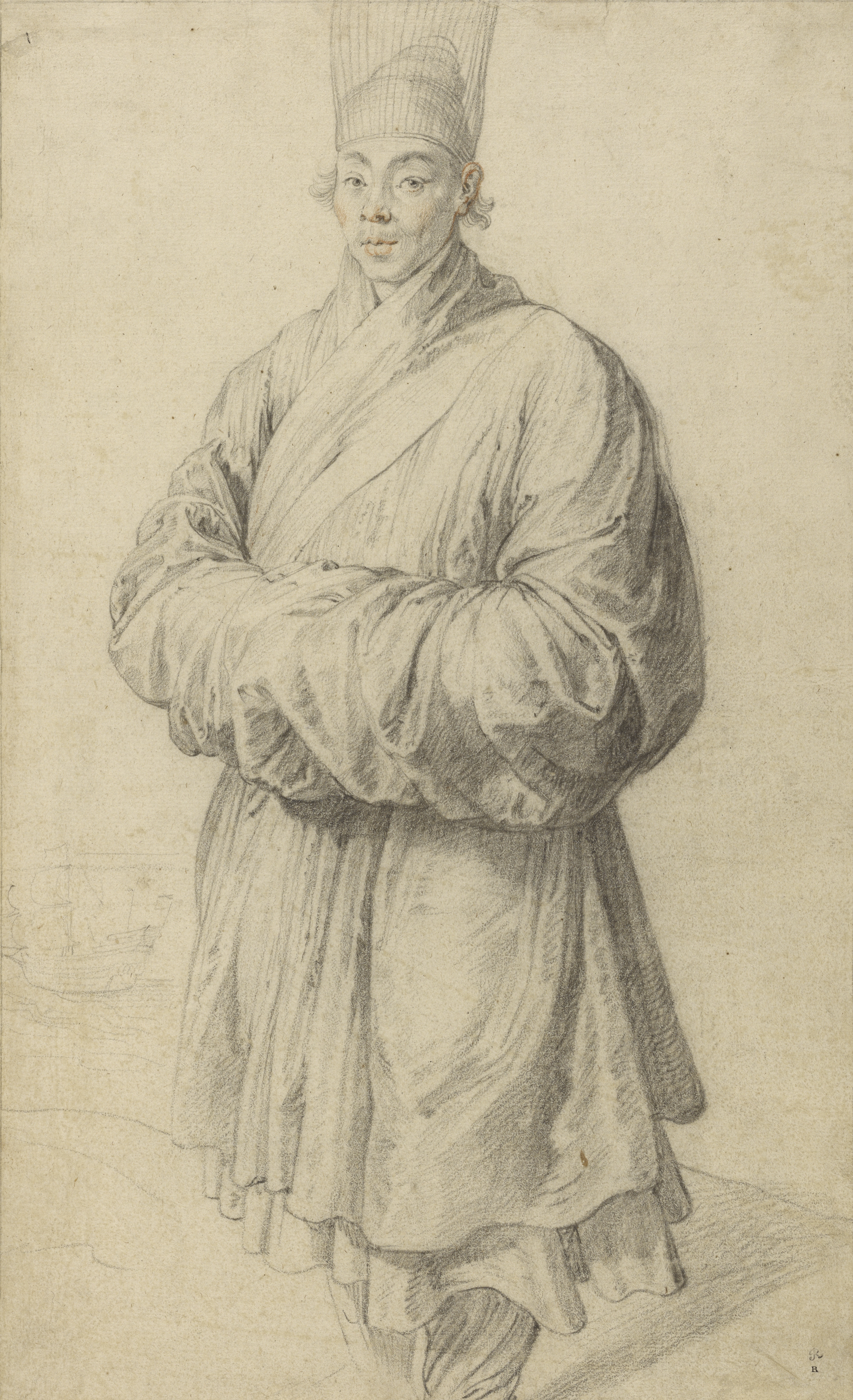
The sketch nicknamed Man in Korean Costume (c. 1617)

In 1934 or 1935, British art historian Claire Stuart Wortley theorized that a Korean had been the subject of a c. 1617 sketch, informally named Man in Korean Costume or Korean Man, by Flemish artist Peter Paul Rubens. The subject's identity and even ethnicity are not known. Wortley proposed that the subject's clothing is distinctly Korean and not Chinese. If the portrait is of a Korean, it is possibly the first known depiction of a Korean by a Western artist. The portrait drew significant attention; in 1983 it was sold at a Christie's auction for £324,000, which was the highest ever sum paid for such a sketch.

Kwak Cha-seop supported this theory in his 2004 book on the basis of his own analysis of the subject's clothing. He also argued it was possible (but still uncertain) that Corea had met with Rubens in Rome around July 1606 to October 1608. In 2015, South Korean art historian Noh Seong-du (노성두) challenged these claims. He argued that the clothes looked more Chinese (based on a forensic reconstruction of the cut-off top and bottom portions of the portrait), and also argued that the 1606–1608 dates conflicted with the general consensus that the portrait was from 1617.

A 2016 paper by art historians Weststeijn and Gesterkamp drew international attention for proposing an alternate theory about the subject. The scholars found a very similar drawing from a book that is believed to predate Rubens' drawing. They proposed that Rubens had based his sketch on that original drawing. Accompanying text described the subject of the drawing as a Chinese merchant named Yppong. Corea arrived in the Netherlands a little over a year after Yppong's departure back to Asia.

== Legacy ==
After Kim Seong-u's 1979 article, Corea's story captured the imagination of the South Korean public. Interest in Corea reached a climax by 1992: the 400th anniversary of the beginning of the Japanese invasions. That year, a musical entitled The Everlasting Flute (불멸의 피리), which was reportedly inspired by Corea's story, was produced. In 1993, author O Se-yeong (오세영) published a novel inspired by Corea's story entitled The Merchant of Venice (베니스의 개성상인). The book was a bestseller, and sold more than two million copies by 1994. Around this time, another novel entitled António Corea (안토니오 꼬레아) was also published. In 2015, South Korean president Park Geun-hye visited the J. Paul Getty Museum, where the Man in Korean Costume portrait is held.
