= Martyrdom of Saint Thomas (Rubens) =

Painting by Peter Paul Rubens

The Martyrdom of St. Thomas
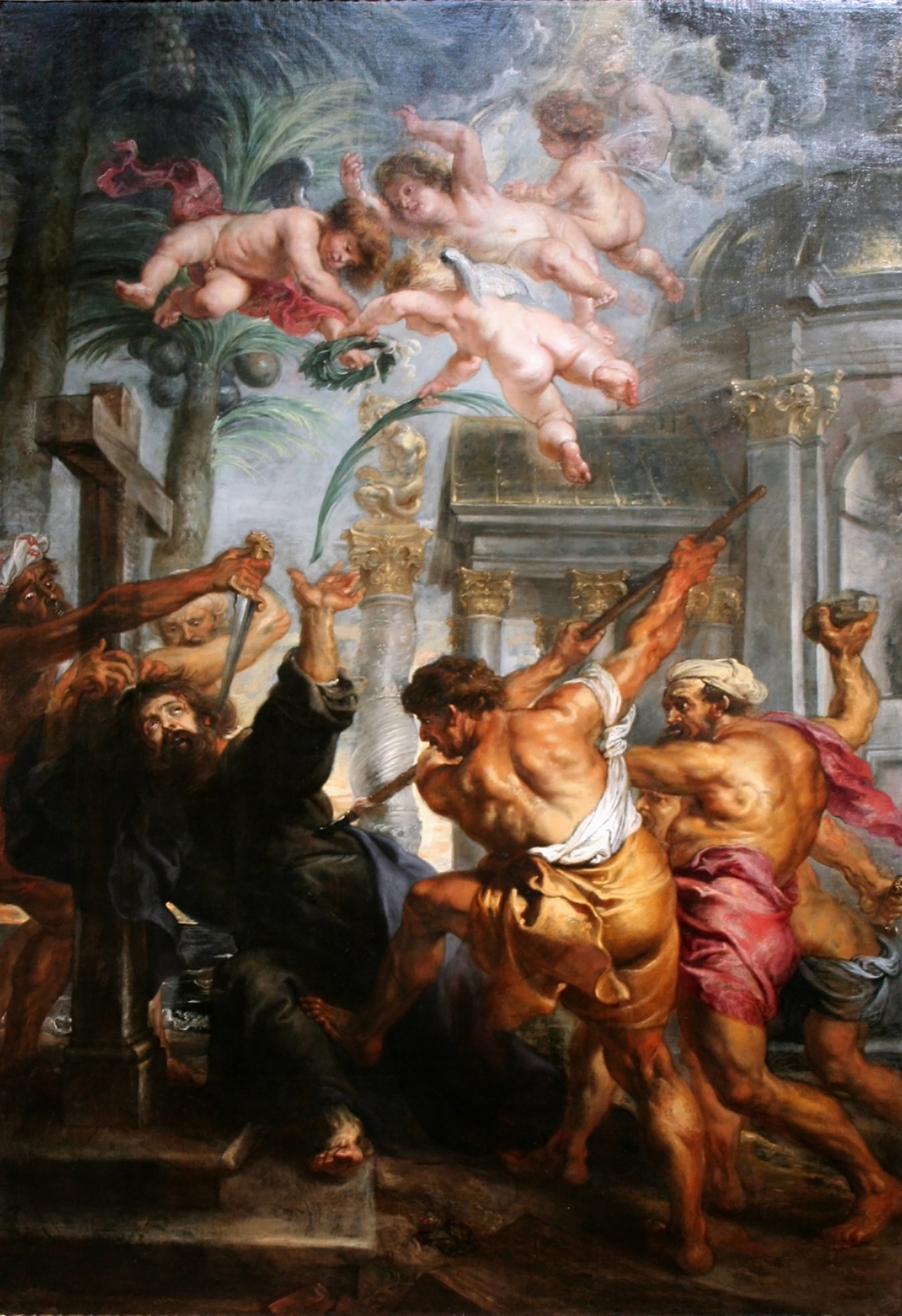
- Artist: Peter Paul Rubens
- Year: 1637-1638
- Medium: oil on canvas
- Dimensions: 382 cm × 254 cm (150 in × 100 in)
- Location: Národní Gallery; Prague

The Martyrdom of Saint Thomas is an oil on canvas painting, painted by Flemish painter Peter Paul Rubens in the years 1637-1638. It depicts St. Thomas the Apostle's martyrdom in Chennai, India on 3 July in 72 CE and was painted for the altar of the Barefoot Augustinian church in Prague, St. Thomas's Church. The Martyrdom of Thomas is notable for Rubens's erroneous use of classical architecture to depict an Indian building in the background of the image and his fantastical depiction of a Hindu god. This painting is now in the collection of the Národní Gallery in Prague.

== Description ==
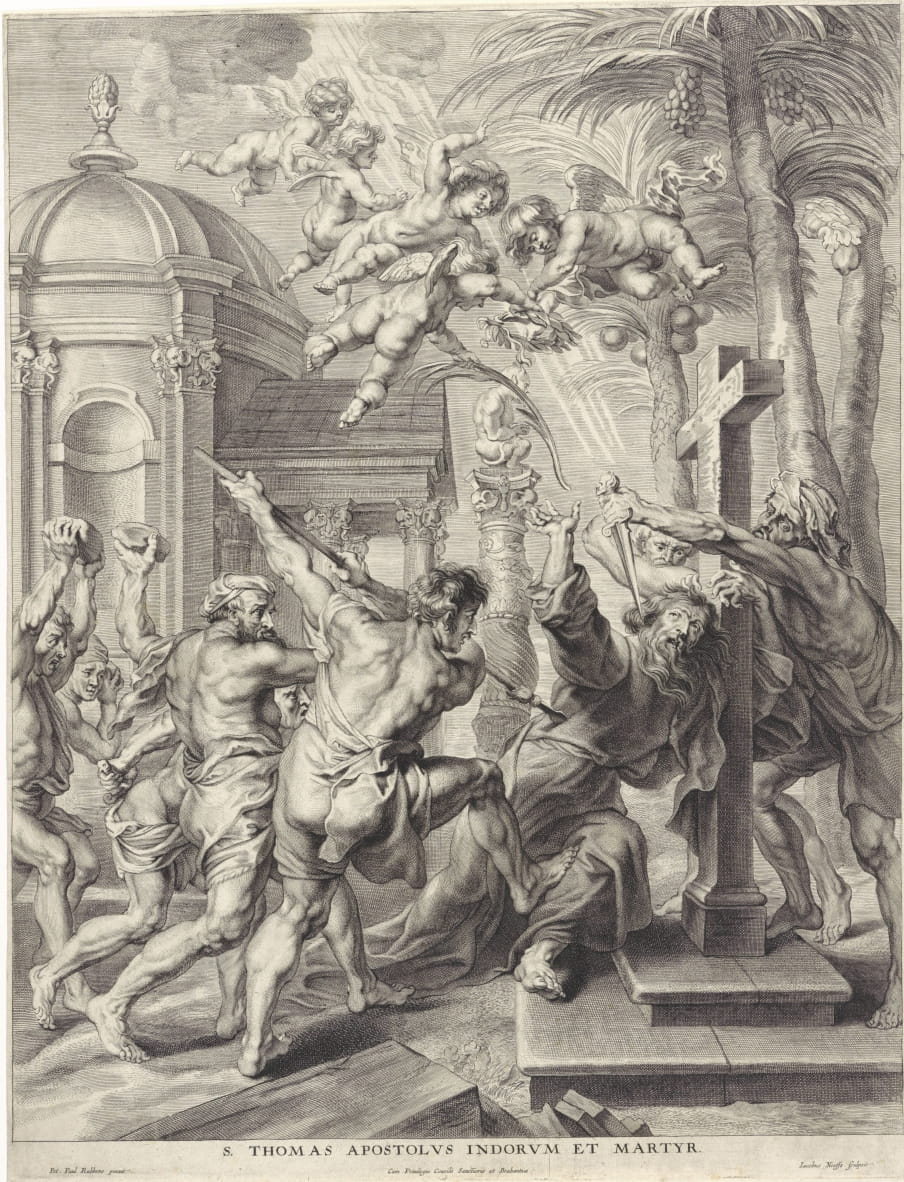
Jacob Neeffs, The Martyrdom of St. Thomas, after Rubens, copper. 507 x 438 mm

Ruben's The Martyrdom of Saint Thomas depicts the apostle the moment he is struck by a spear, causing his death. There are eleven figures present; five being angels, five being Brahmins, and the last is Thomas himself. Dressed in black and barefoot, Thomas clutches a stone cross while reaching towards an angel handing him a palm frond. There is a Brahmin behind him holding a dagger above Thomas and another coming towards him, about to hurl a rock at him. Behind them is a Roman styled domed building with spiral columns, a devil-like idol figure, and elephants heads. There are also two palm trees and in the space between the cross, Thomas, and the dark-skinned figure is waves from the sea. Originally, this painting was larger in size, with another palm tree and Brahmin figure. When Prague's St. Thomas Church was severely damaged in 1723 by lightning, the church had to be reconstructed. During this time, a frame was redesigned which caused it to be trimmed around on all sides. The only known image of the original composition is a print based on the original engraved by Jacob Neeffs.

== Subject matter ==
According to legend, Saint Thomas was a skilled architect and Apostle, whom was called upon by the Lord to travel to India. The king of India, Gundoferus, was seeking an architect to build him a Roman styled palace, a "mirabili palatio" (magnificent palace). Although Saint Thomas was hesitant to go, the Lord promised to guide him safely and insisted it was Saint Thomas who would become a missionary for the "heathens". Along with the promise of safety, God promised for Saint Thomas to join him in heaven through martyrdom. Thomas soon went to India and was entrusted with funds to build the king a palace while he was away on a journey. Instead, Thomas distributed the money among the people and begun his mission. The king's brother, wanting a palace as well, summoned Thomas to work for him. When Thomas refused, instead offering the kingdom of God, the king's brother sent for him to be found and tortured. Thomas challenged the king's brother, announcing he would worship a pagan god, only if God did not destroy the idol in the same moment. If God were to destroy it, the men sent to kill Thomas would have to convert to Christianity. When Thomas began to bend down to worship the idol, it melted like wax. Instead of converting, the Brahmins attacked Thomas in the name of their idol, killing him with a spear.

== Commission ==
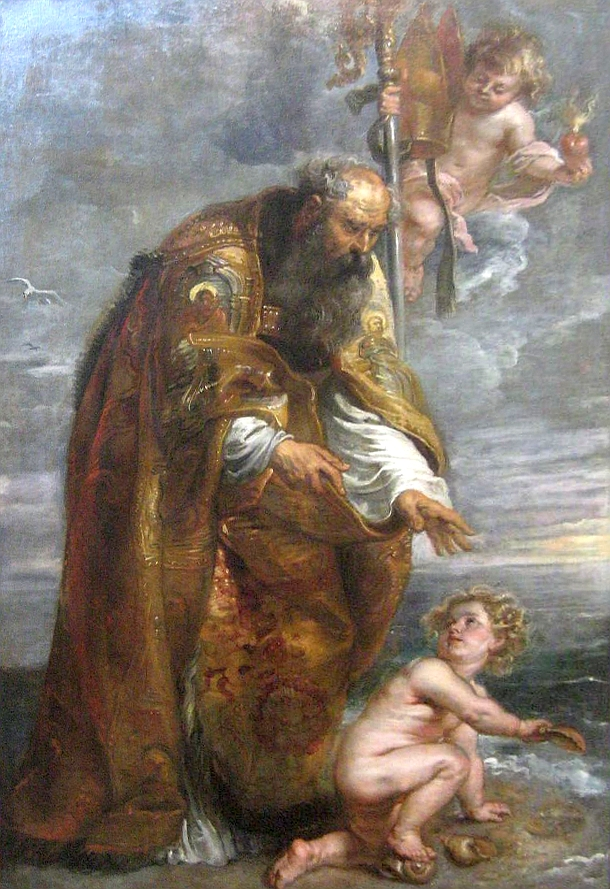
Saint Augustine at the seashore - Peter Paul Rubens (1636-1638)

Jan Svitavsky commissioned The Martyrdom of Saint Thomas alongside Saint Augustine at the seashore for the altar in the church. Svitavsky commissioned both of these paintings serving his last period of office as the prior of Prague's Augustinian monastery. Rubens was paid 945 guilders for this commission.

== Stylistic choices ==
Rubens, never traveling to India himself, used a variety of influences and stories to create this painting. It is thought that Rubens used the story of Saint Thomas from the Legenda Aurea, or Golden Legend by Jacobus de Voragine. Rubens also used the accounts of India and Asia in the book India Orientalis by brothers Theodor and Israel De Bry to guide his understanding of what the other figures and Asia might look like. In the background, we can see a coconut and areca palm tree, which was meant to indicate the oriental context to this painting. The Christian Paradise is said to be flanked with palm trees, making palms are a symbol of enteral life in Christian belief. Here, Rubens uses the palms as a symbol of Saint Thomas's eternal life that succeed martyrdom.

=== Saint Thomas ===
According to Pedro de Ribadeneyra's Flos Sanctorum, Saint Thomas wore an old cloak and dressed like a poor man. He was also described to have "incompta caesarie" and "vilis, despectus, inops"; uncombed hair with a common, unsightly, and impoverished look. Uncommon to the time in which Thomas lived, he was depicted barefoot with unusual dress for an Apostle, wearing a cowl similar to the ones worn by mendicant friars. To make Thomas appear as a member of the Augustinian order in Prague, Rubens decided to dress the Apostle similarly, with bare feet. The purpose of doing so was to generate feelings in the Augustinian observers to view Saint Thomas as a model and serve their faith better because his martyrdom. The posture of the dying Apostle is similar to that of dying Laocoön. The sculpture was widely known by sixteenth and seventeenth century artists because of its example of grief and agony and was held in a high regard. During his stay in Rome, Rubens had drawn several perspectives of the sculpture to use it for future references, such as this painting.

=== Brahmins ===
For the Indian figures, Rubens used the book India Orientalis to guide his portrayal. In the book, Indian Brahmins are described to be in the same shape and proportion of the Europeans, with their only difference being religion and skin tone. They are also describe to walk around almost nude, with cloth covering the groin area and turbans on their heads. Rubens depicted the Brahmins very closely to how they are described in this book, with almost nude muscular shapes and cloth coverings.

=== Architecture ===
One of the most notable pieces of this painting is the use of architecture to support the story origins. Rubens painted twisted columns, a highly symbolic value in Christian art, but paired it with a pagan idol and elephant heads. The purpose was to display the location of Thomas's martyrdom while connecting Roman architecture similar to that which the Apostle might have produced. The elephant heads are not only a symbol of India but a symbol of Thomas's legend. Rubens references Pedro de Ribadeneyra's Flos Sanctorum again, in which there is a story of Saint Thomas moving a large tree singlehandedly when several elephants could not. For the idol at the top of the column, Rubens referenced Imagini delli dei de gl'antichi, a sixteenth-century book detailing the images of the gods of antiquity. Rubens then added animal-like feet, two horns, and a tail to the idol. The purpose of presenting the idol this was to relay the message that anything against the Christian religion is work of the devil, conveyed through the devil-like figure.
