= History of the Catholic Church in Japan =

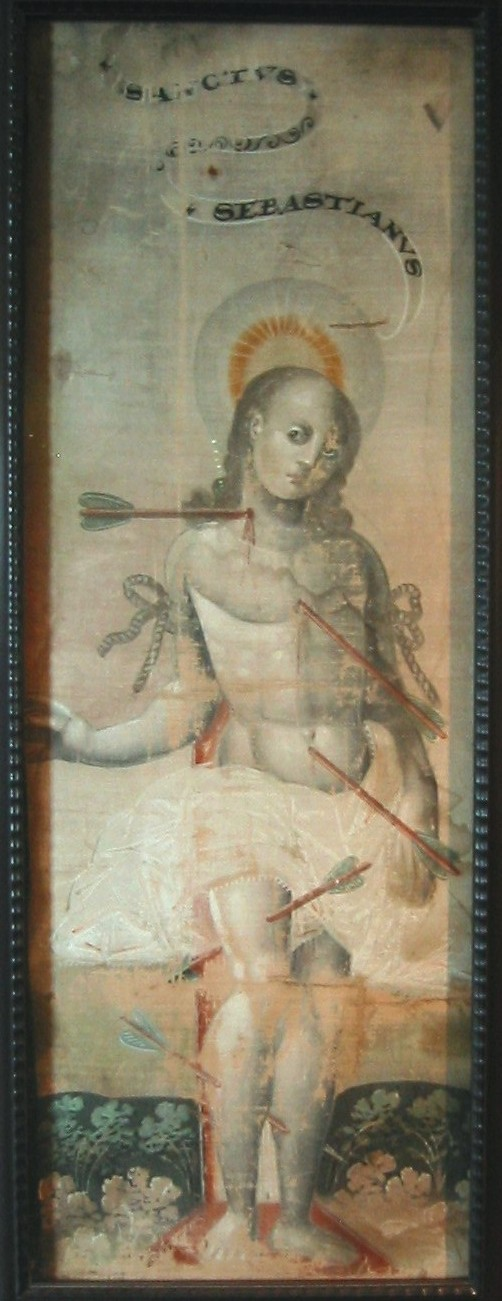
The martyrdom of Saint Sebastian, 1590–1600 tempera painting, Japan

Christian missionaries arrived in Japan with Francis Xavier and the Jesuits in the 1540s and briefly flourished, with over 100,000 converts, including many daimyōs in Kyushu. It soon met resistance from the highest office holders of Japan. Emperor Ōgimachi issued edicts to ban Catholicism in 1565 and 1568, but to little effect. Beginning in 1587, with imperial regent Toyotomi Hideyoshi's ban on Jesuit missionaries, Christianity was repressed as a threat to national unity. After the Tokugawa shogunate formally banned public Christianity in 1620, many Catholics went underground, becoming hidden Christians (隠れキリシタン, kakure kirishitan), while others were killed. Only after the Meiji Restoration was Christianity re-established in Japan.

== Background ==
Portuguese shipping arrived in Japan in 1543, and Catholic missionary activities in Japan began in earnest around 1549, performed in the main by Portuguese-sponsored Jesuits until Spanish-sponsored Franciscans and Dominicans gained access to Japan. Of the 95 Jesuits who worked in Japan up to 1600, 57 were Portuguese, 20 were Spaniards and 18 Italian. Francisco Xavier, Cosme de Torres (a Jesuit priest) and Juan Fernandez were the first who arrived in Kagoshima with hopes to bring Catholicism to Japan.

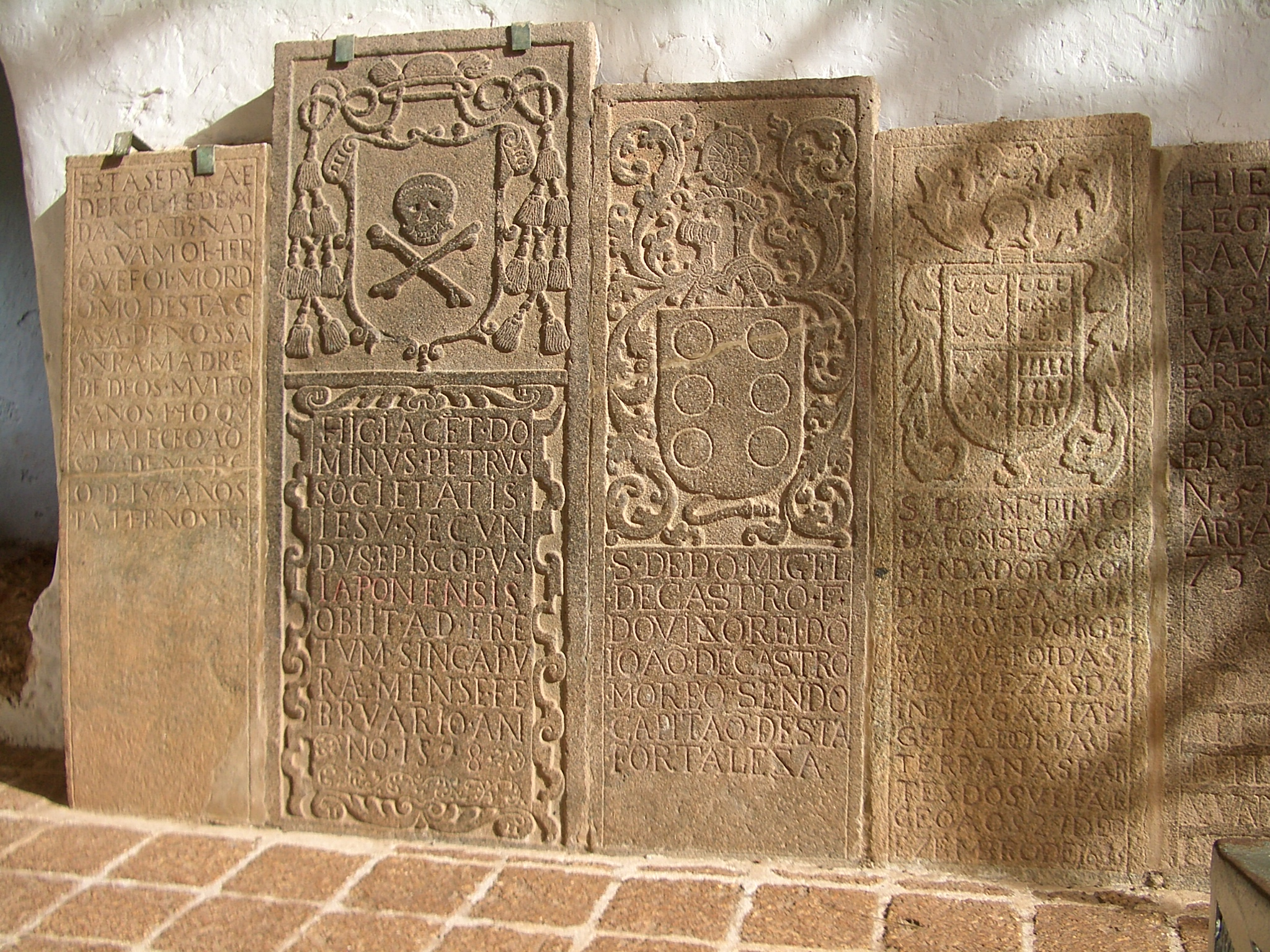
The gravestone (second from the left), in Malacca's St. Paul's Church, of Pedro Martins S.J., the second bishop of Funai, who had died in February 1598

The main goal was evangelism. But religion was also an integral part of the state and evangelization was seen as having both secular and spiritual benefits for both Portugal and Spain. Wherever these powers attempted to expand their territories or influence, missionaries would soon follow. By the Treaty of Tordesillas, the two powers divided the world between them into exclusive spheres of influence, trade and colonization. Although at the time of the demarcation, neither nation had any direct contact with Japan, that nation fell into the sphere of the Portuguese.

The countries disputed the attribution of Japan. Since neither could colonize it, the exclusive right to propagate Christianity in Japan meant the exclusive right to trade with Japan. Portuguese-sponsored Jesuits under Alessandro Valignano took the lead in proselytizing in Japan over the objection of the Spaniards. The fait accompli was approved in Pope Gregory XIII's papal bull of 1575, which decided that Japan belonged to the Portuguese diocese of Macau. In 1588, the diocese of Funai (the Funai Domain, centred on Nagasaki) was founded under Portuguese protection.

In rivalry with the Jesuits, Spanish-sponsored mendicant orders entered into Japan via Manila. While criticizing Jesuit activities, they actively lobbied the Pope. Their campaigns resulted in Pope Clement VIII's decree of 1600, which allowed Spanish friars to enter Japan via Portuguese India, and Pope Paul V's decree of 1608, which abolished the restrictions on the route. The Portuguese accused Spanish Jesuits of working for their homeland instead of their patron. The power struggle between Jesuits and mendicant orders caused a schism within the diocese of Funai. Furthermore, mendicant orders tried in vain to establish a diocese on the Tohoku region that was to be independent from the Portuguese one.

Religious rivalries between Catholics and Protestants reached Japan with the arrival of Dutch and English traders in the early 17th century. Although the English withdrew from their Japanese operations after a decade of trading under King James I due to lack of profitability, the Dutch continued to trade with Japan and became the only European country that maintained trade relations with Japan until the 19th century. Dutch traders frequently criticized the Catholic Church in Japan, which subsequently affected shogunate policies toward the kingdoms of Spain and Portugal.

== Missionaries ==
=== Francis Xavier ===
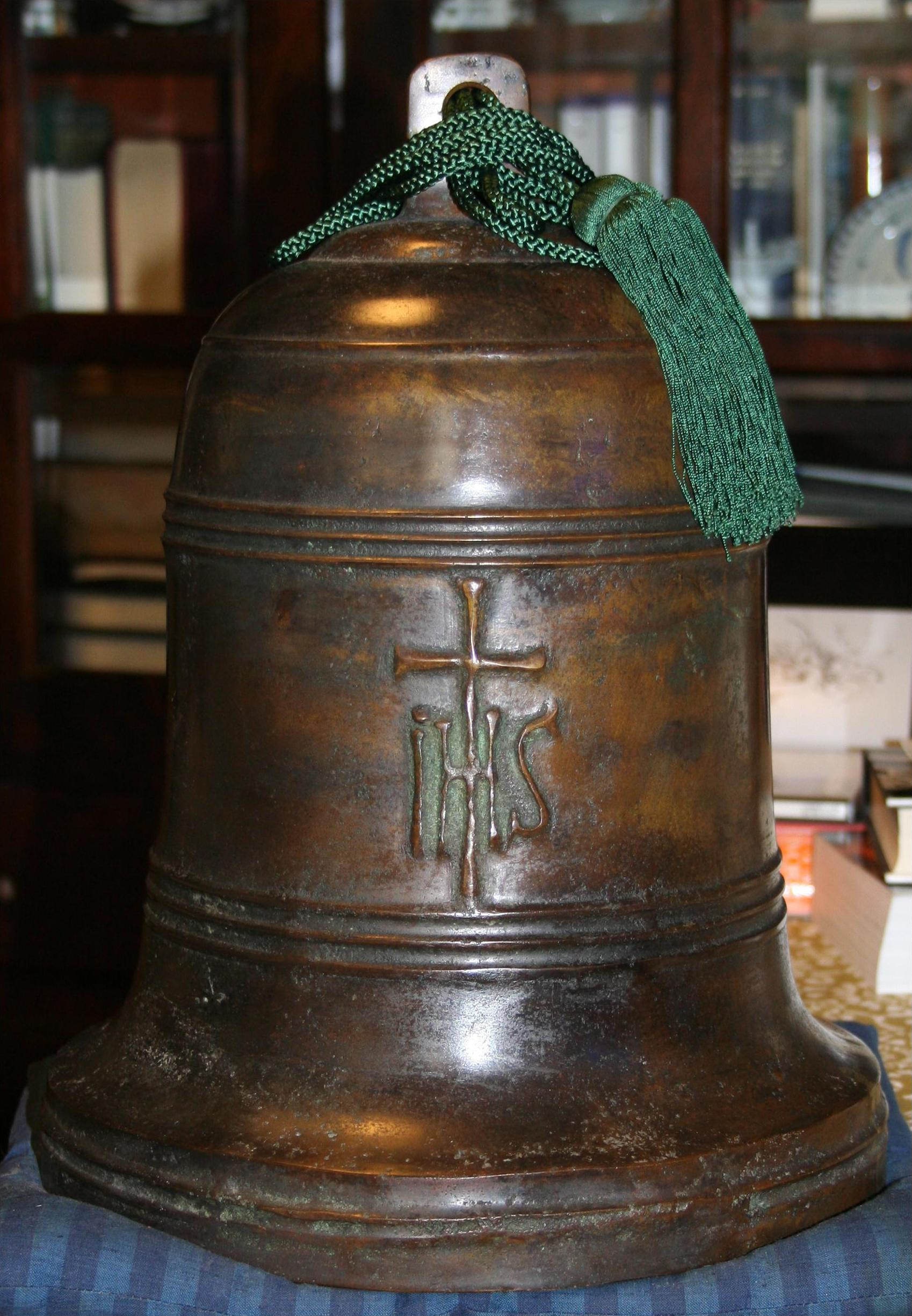
Japanese-Portuguese Bell Inscribed 1570, Nantoyōsō Collection, Japan

Francis Xavier was the first Jesuit to go to Japan as a missionary. In Portuguese Malacca in December 1547, Xavier met a Japanese man from Kagoshima named Anjirō. Anjirō had heard from Xavier in 1545 and had travelled from Kagoshima to Malacca with the purpose of meeting with him. Having been charged with murder, Anjirō had fled Japan. He told Xavier extensively about his former life and the customs and culture of his beloved homeland. Anjirō helped Xavier as a mediator and translator for the mission to Japan that now seemed much more possible. "I asked [Anjirō] whether the Japanese would become Christians if I went with him to this country, and he replied that they would not do so immediately, but would first ask me many questions and see what I knew. Above all, they would want to see whether my life corresponded with my teaching."

Xavier returned to India in January 1548. The next 15 months were occupied with various journeys and administrative measures in India. Then, due to displeasure at what he considered un-Christian life and manners on the part of the Portuguese which impeded missionary work, he left India and traveled to East Asia. He left Goa on 15 April 1549, stopped at Malacca and visited Canton. He was accompanied by Anjirō, two other Japanese men, the father Cosme de Torrès and Brother João Fernandes. He had taken with him presents for the "King of Japan" since he was intending to introduce himself as the Apostolic Nuncio.

Xavier reached Japan on 27 July 1549, with Anjirō and three other Jesuits, but it was not until 15 August that he went ashore at Kagoshima, the principal port of the province of Satsuma on the island of Kyūshū. As a representative of the Portuguese king, he was received in a friendly manner and was hosted by Anjirō's family until October 1550. From October to December 1550, he resided in Yamaguchi. Shortly before Christmas, he left for Kyoto but failed to meet with the Emperor. He returned to Yamaguchi in March 1551, where he was permitted to preach by the daimyō of the province. However, lacking fluency in the Japanese language, he had to limit himself to reading aloud a Japanese translation of a catechism.

The Japanese people were not easily converted; many of the people were already Buddhist or Shinto. Francis tried to combat the disposition of some of the Japanese that a God who had created everything, including evil, could not be good. The concept of Hell was also a struggle; the Japanese were bothered by the idea of their ancestors living in Hell. Despite Francis' different religion, he felt that they were good people, and could be converted.

Xavier brought with him paintings of the Madonna and the Madonna and Child. These paintings were used to help teach the Japanese about Christianity. There was a huge language barrier as Japanese was unlike other languages the missionaries had previously encountered. For a long time Francis struggled to learn the language. Artwork continued to play a role in Francis' teachings in Asia.

Xavier was welcomed by the Shingon monks since he used the word Dainichi for the Christian God; attempting to adapt the concept to local traditions. As Xavier learned more about the religious nuances of the word, he changed to Deusu from the Latin and Portuguese Deus. The monks later realized that Xavier was preaching a rival religion and grew more aggressive towards his attempts at conversion.

When Xavier arrived in Japan, the country was embroiled in a nationwide civil war. Neither the emperor nor the Ashikaga shōgun could exercise power over the nation. At first, Xavier planned to gain permission for building a mission from the emperor but was disappointed with the devastation of the imperial residence. The Jesuits approached daimyō in southwestern Japan and succeeded in converting some of them. One reason for their conversion may have been the Portuguese trade in which the Jesuits acted as brokers. The Jesuits recognized this and approached local rulers with offers of trade and exotic gifts.

The Jesuits believed that it was most effective to seek to influence people in power and to pass the religion downward to the commoners. At the least, they needed to gain permission from local rulers to propagate Catholicism within their domains. Indeed, as feudal lords converted to Catholicism, the number of believers within their territories also drastically increased. After the edict banning Christianity, there were communities that kept practicing Catholicism without any contact with the Church until missionaries were able to return much later.

When Xavier disembarked in Kagoshima, the principal chiefs of the two branches of the Shimazu family, Sanehisa and Katsuhisa, were warring for the sovereignty of their lands. Katsuhisa adopted Takahisa Shimazu, who in 1542 was accepted as head of the clan, having previously received the Portuguese merchants on Tanegashima Island and learned about the use of firearms. Later, he met Xavier himself at the castle of Uchiujijo and permitted the conversion of his vassals.

Having a religious background, Takahisa showed himself to be benevolent and already allowed freedom of worship, but did not help the missionaries or favor their church. Failing to find a way to the centre of affairs, the court of the Emperor, Xavier soon tired and left to Yamaguchi, thus beginning the Yamaguchi period. Xavier stayed in Yamaguchi for two months on his way to an abortive audience with the Emperor in Kyoto. Yamaguchi was a prosperous and refined city, and its leaders, the Ouchi family, were aware that Xavier's journey to Japan had begun after the completion of his mission in India.

They took Catholicism for some sort of new sect of Buddhism, and were curious to know of the priest's doctrine. Tolerant but shrewd, their eyes less on baptism than the Portuguese cargoes from Macau, they granted the Jesuit permission to preach. The uncompromising Xavier took to the streets of the city denouncing, among other things, infanticide, idolatry, and homosexuality (the last being widely accepted at the time). Misunderstandings were inevitable.

The Jesuits attempted to expand their activity to Kyoto and the surrounding regions. In 1559, Gaspar Vilela obtained permission from Ashikaga Yoshiteru to teach Christianity. This license was the same as those given to Buddhist temples, so special treatment cannot be confirmed regarding the Jesuits. On the other hand, Emperor Ōgimachi issued edicts to ban Catholicism in 1565 and 1568. The orders of the Emperor and the shōgun made little difference.

Christians refer positively to Oda Nobunaga, who died in the middle of the unification of Japan. He favored the Jesuit missionary Luís Fróis and generally tolerated Christianity. But overall, he undertook no remarkable policies toward Catholicism. Actually, Catholic power in his domain was trivial because he did not conquer western Japan, where the Jesuits were based.

With the passage of time, Xavier's sojourn in Japan could be considered somewhat fruitful as attested by congregations established in Hirado, Yamaguchi and Bungo. Xavier worked for more than two years in Japan and saw his successor-Jesuits established. He then decided to return to India.

For 45 years, the Jesuits were the only Christian missionaries in Asia, and then the Franciscans began proselytizing as well.

=== Alessandro Valignano and the accommodation policy ===
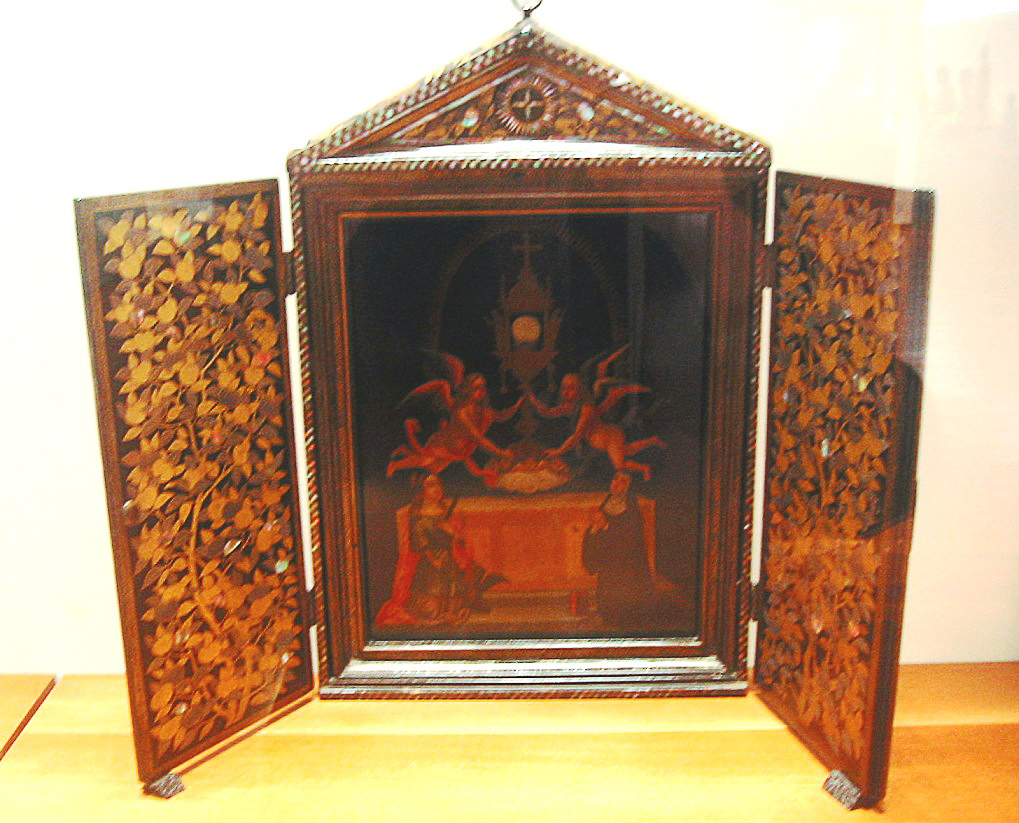
A Japanese votive altar, Nanban style. End of the 16th century. Guimet Museum.

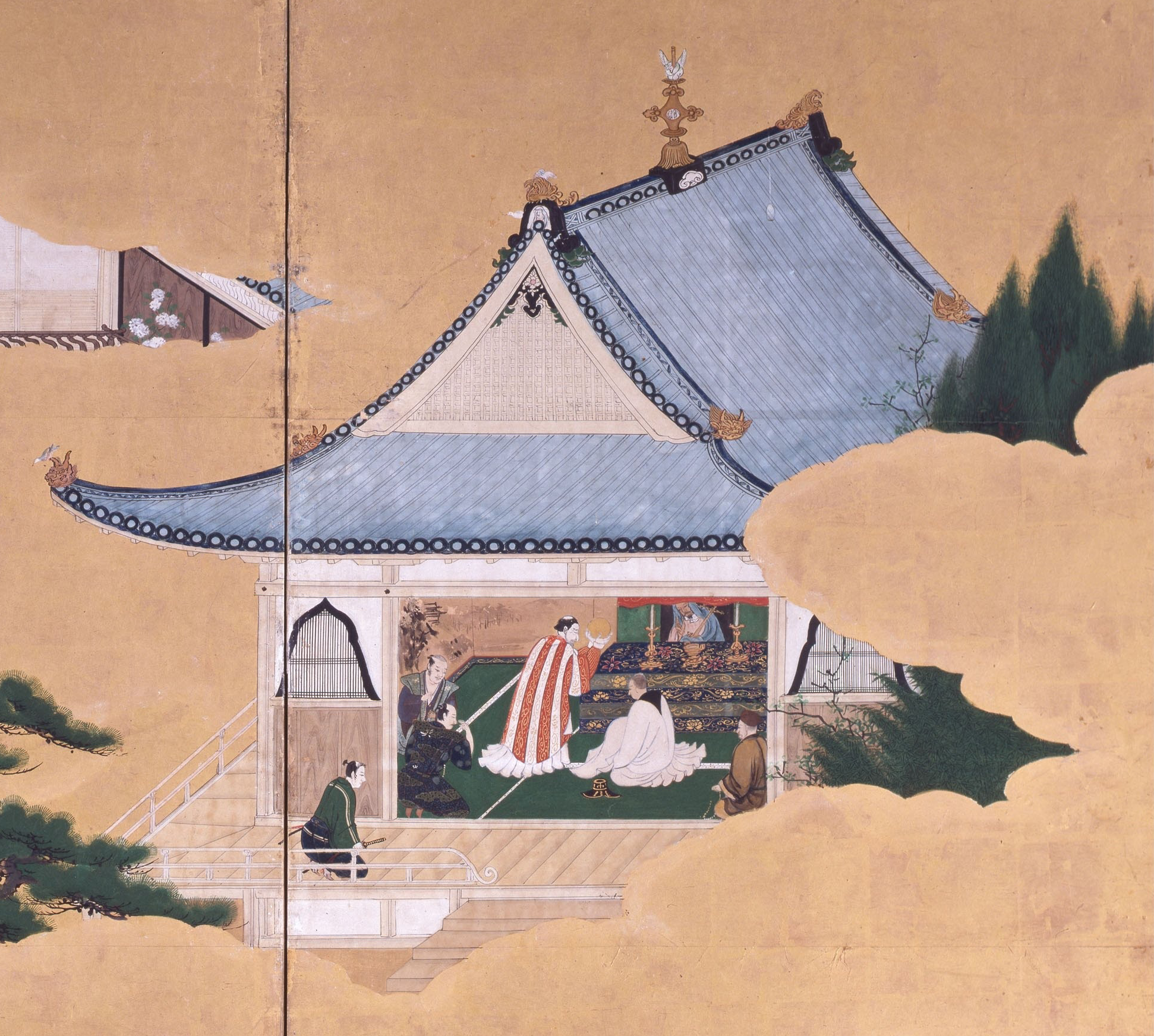
Celebrating a Christian Mass in a Nanban-ji

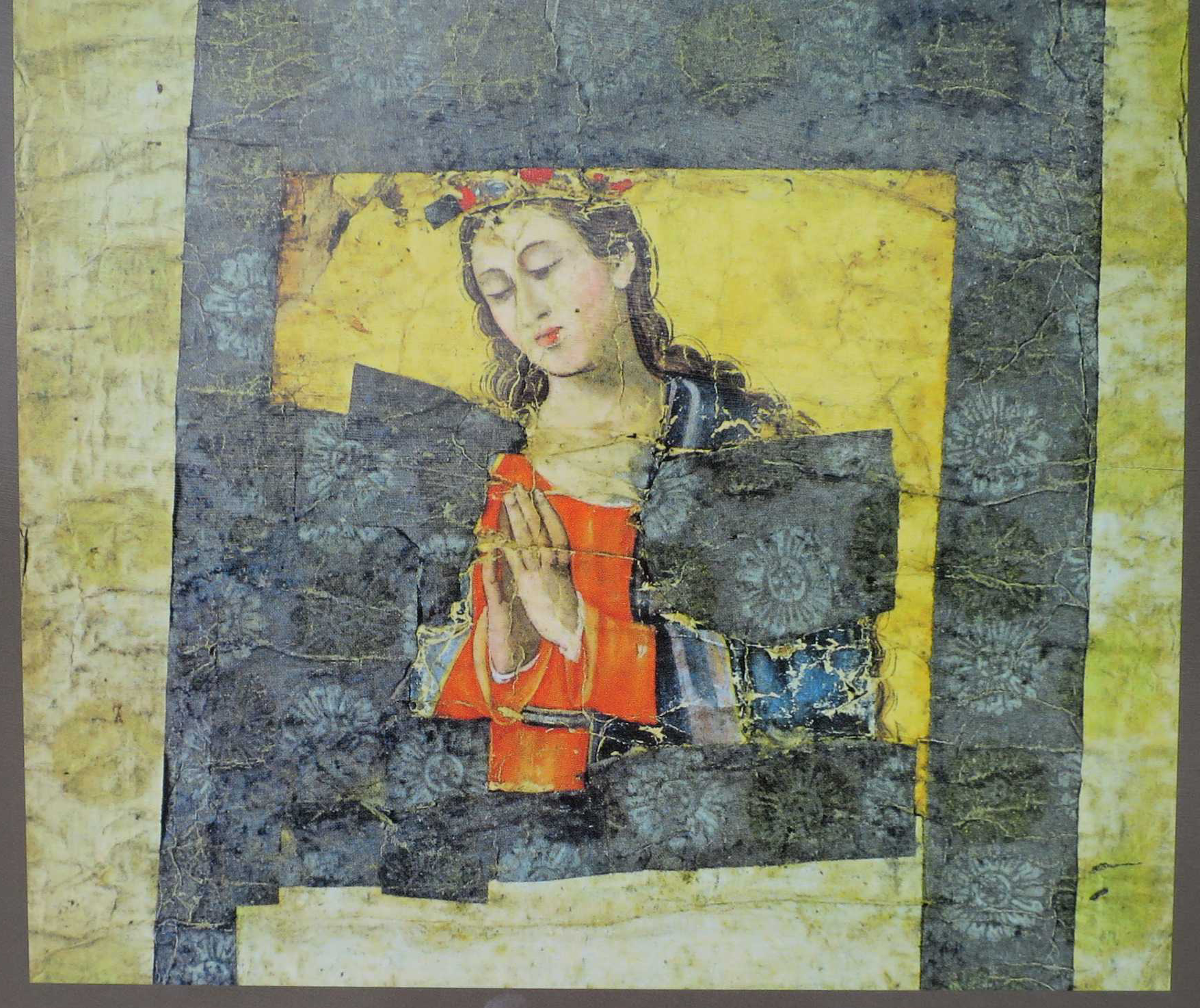
Saint Mary of the Snows (Nanban art) c. 1600

Alessandro Valignano, who supervised the Jesuit missions to the Far East from 1574 to 1606, promoted a deep accommodation (Accomodatio) of Japanese culture. This basic strategy for Catholic proselytism, also called "adaptationism", put the advance of the Christian faith above adherence to traditional Christian behavior. He attempted to avoid cultural frictions by making a compromise with local customs that other missionaries viewed as conflicting with Catholic values.

By 1579, there were about 130,000 converts. By 1603, according to Jesuit estimates of the time, the Japanese mission had become the largest overseas Christian community that was not under the rule of a European power, counting c. 200,000–300,000 converts, 190 churches, and 122 Jesuits in activity. The Jesuits possessed in 1614 eleven colleges, sixty-four residences, two novitiates, and two seminaries; according to Ludwig von Pastor (citing Steichen (194) and L. Delplace (1884)), the total number of Christians in Japan was c. 1,000,000. Its uniqueness meant that Japan was then the sole overseas country in which all members of those confraternities were locals, as was the case with Christian missions in Mexico, Peru, Brazil, the Philippines, or India, in spite of the presence of a colonial elite.

The earliest success Christianity witnessed in Japan occurred in Kyushu. Conversions of local warlords like Ōmura Sumitada, Arima Yoshisada, and Ōtomo Sōrin led to the conversion of many of their subjects. The conversion of several elites in the area was likely due to the decentralized nature of the Sengoku period where warlords vied for control among themselves. This power vacuum led some warlords to believe that being more open to external sources of power and legitimacy as a possible method to gain an advantage.

As several daimyos and their subjects converted to Christianity, the destruction of Buddhist and Shinto temples and shrines would often accompany it, with the Jesuits also contributing to the destruction and persecutions. Buddhist monks and Shinto priests would face persecution by being forcefully evicted out of the temples which were then reused as Christian facilities. Some Christian daimyos also ordered the forced marriage of monks.

Most Japanese Christians lived in Kyushu, but Christianization was now a regional phenomenon and had a national impact. By the end of the 16th century it was possible to find baptized people in virtually every province of Japan, many of them organized in communities. On the eve of the Sekigahara battle, fifteen daimyōs were baptized, and their domains stretched from Hyuga in Southeast Kyushu to Dewa in North Honshū (see Costa 2003). Hundreds of churches had been built throughout Japan.

Accepted on a national scale, Christianity was also successful among different social groups from the poor to the rich, peasants, traders, sailors, warriors, or courtesans. Most of the daily activities of the Church were performed by Japanese from the beginning, giving the Japanese Church a native face, and this was one of the reasons for its success. By 1590, there were seventy native brothers in Japan, fully one half of Jesuits in Japan and fifteen percent of all Jesuits who were working in Asia.

The 1592 War between Japan and Korea also provided Westerners with a rare opportunity to visit Korea. Under orders of Gomaz, the Jesuit Gregorious de Cespedes arrived in Korea with a Japanese monk for the purposes of ministering to the Japanese troops. He stayed there for approximately 18 months, until April or May 1595, thus being on record as the first European missionary to visit the Korean peninsula but was unable to make any inroads. The "Annual Letters of Japan" made a substantial contribution to the introduction of Korea to Europe, Francis Xavier having crossed paths with Korean envoys dispatched to Japan during 1550 and 1551.

The Japanese missions were economically self-sufficient. Nagasaki's misericórdias became rich and powerful institutions which every year received large donations. The brotherhood grew in numbers to over 100 by 1585 and 150 in 1609. Controlled by the elite of Nagasaki, and not by Portuguese, it had two hospitals (one for lepers) and a large church. By 1606, there already existed a feminine religious order called Miyako no Bikuni (Nuns of Kyoto) which accepted Korean converts such as Marina Pak, baptized in Nagasaki. Nagasaki was called "the Rome of Japan" and most of its inhabitants were Christians. By 1611, it had ten churches and was divided into eight parishes, including a specifically Korean order.

== Nature of early Christian community ==
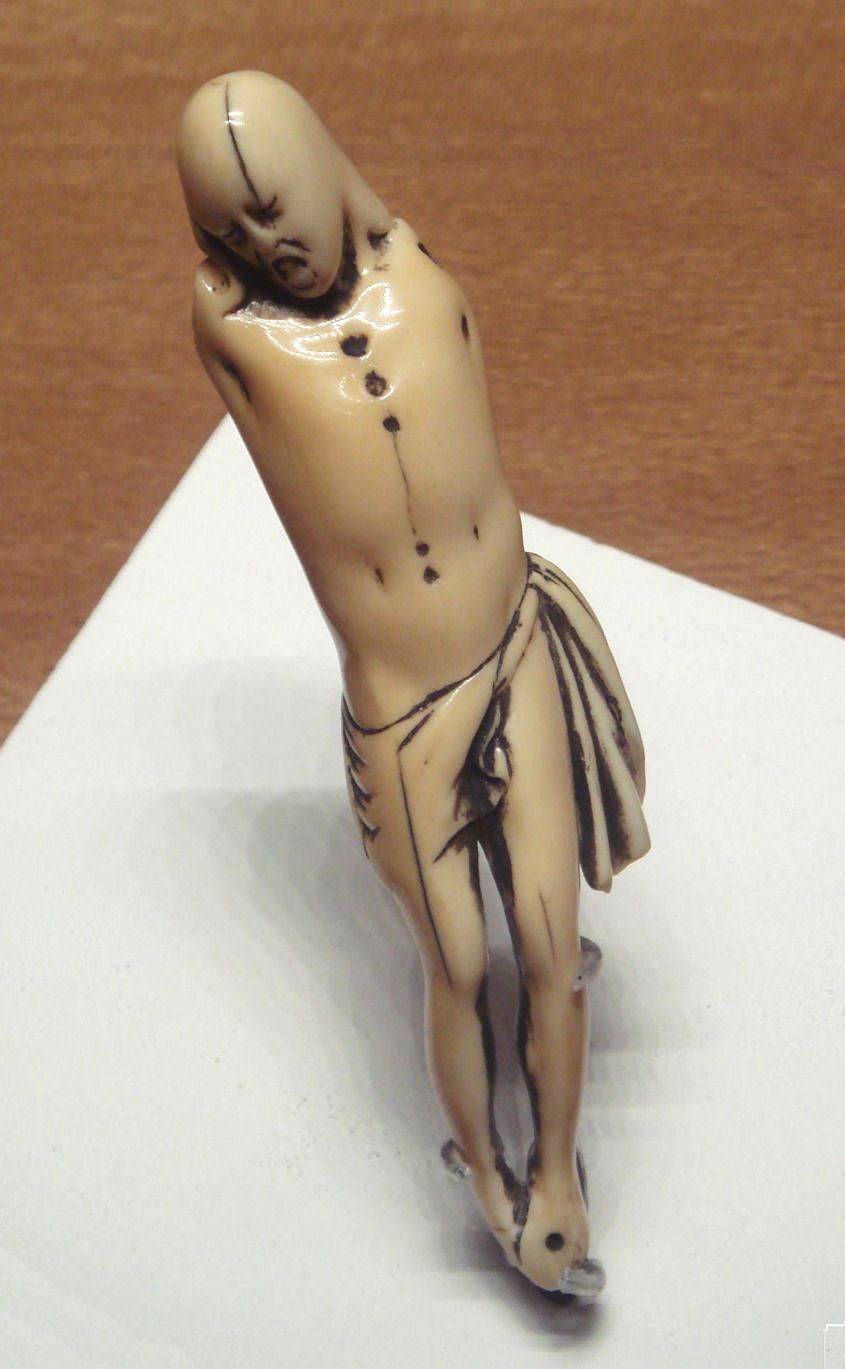
Netsuke depicting Christ, 17th century, Japan. Musée Guimet.

=== The rise of Nagasaki as a Port City ===
==== Establishment and Christian Influence ====
Nagasaki's transformation into a significant port city in Japan began around 1570, driven by the arrival of Christianity and Portuguese trade. Initially an unpopulated promontory covered with wild thickets, Nagasaki was chosen by Jesuit missionaries, with support from the Christian daimyo Ōmura Sumitada (Don Bartolomeu), for its natural port advantages, including a narrow promontory that offered visual defense of the bay entrance. Sumitada, the first Japanese daimyo to convert to Catholicism, had previously invited Jesuits to settle in Yokoseura in the early 1560s, where a church was built and Portuguese ships visited in 1562 and 1563. However, Yokoseura's destruction in 1563 by anti-Christian groups and rival merchants prompted the Jesuits to relocate to Nagasaki. Sumitada donated the land to establish a settlement for displaced Christians, many of whom were exiles fleeing religious persecution or wars, granting perpetual usage rights and extraterritorial privileges in return for securing permanent port customs and entry taxes, with designated officials stationed to oversee their collection.

==== Growth and Jesuit strategy ====
By 1579, Nagasaki evolved from a village of 400 houses to a town of 5,000 by 1590, and 15,000 by the early 17th century, becoming a hub for Portuguese trade and Catholic activity with multiple parishes established to serve spiritual needs. Led by Alessandro Valignano, the Jesuits accepted Ōmura's land donation to create a secure base for their mission and to support Portuguese trade. Valignano recognized Nagasaki's strategic importance for aiding displaced Christians and funding missionary efforts. The donation was accepted cautiously, with conditions allowing the Jesuits to withdraw if necessary, reflecting the political instability in Japan and the non-binding nature of Japanese land donations, which could be revoked by lords or their successors.

The Nagasaki Misericórdia (almshouse) was formally instituted in 1583 through the election of officers and the establishment of a hospital. This charitable institution managed a secondary facility outside the city for leprosy patients, underscoring the profound impact of Christian practices in a Japan that lacked hospitals prior to Portuguese arrival. Jesuit Luis Fróis recorded that this facility served individuals considered "repugnant" by Japanese society. This endeavor exemplified the innovative introduction of Christian charitable principles, offering a novel framework for Japanese social welfare. Moreover, the establishment of an almshouse in Hirado as early as 1561, with officers actively collecting donations, attests to the early adoption of the Misericórdia system across Japan and the deep integration of Christian charitable ideals into local communities.

Through their operation of hospitals for the poor and critically ill, the Jesuit order deepened engagement with marginalized communities, resulting in their categorization as impure. Historian George Ellison observes that, despite being driven by profound compassion, the missionaries' actions yielded unintended social consequences. While these hospitals gained favor among the destitute, the elite distanced themselves from the missionaries, citing fears of "contamination". This concept of "contamination" was less about physical disease transmission and more about anxieties over social and symbolic impurity associated with the missionaries. In environments frequented by leprosy or scurvy patients, Jesuit missionaries were perceived as vectors of impurity, risking their portrayal as tainted entities or sources of defilement in the eyes of aristocratic patrons. Consequently, they faced the danger of being situated as loci of impurity. In Japanese history, the purity-impurity dichotomy has recurrently served as a logic of domination rooted in hierarchical structures. Though its specific manifestations shift across time and context, this binary consistently sustains mechanisms of control and exclusion. Unwittingly, the Jesuits positioned themselves within the subordinate domain of impurity.

=== Japanese servitude and Jesuit perspectives ===
==== Slavery before Portuguese arrival ====
During the Sengoku period, Japanese Daimyos and merchants often sold off prisoners of battle into slavery. Portuguese sources, corroborated by Japanese texts like Koyo Gunkan and Hojo Godaiki, describe "the greatest cruelties" inflicted during conflicts such as the 1553 Battle of Kawanakajima and the 1578 Shimazu campaigns. Captives, particularly women, boys, and girls, faced violence, with communities in regions devastated. The inter-Asian slave trade, including wokou piracy, further intensified suffering, with Zheng Shungong's 1556 report noting 200–300 Chinese slaves in Satsuma treated "like cattle" for labor, a fate shared by many Japanese.

The custom of geninka (下人化) encompassed practices resembling slavery. (Note: Genin (下人) were low-status, often hereditary servants in medieval Japan, employed in agricultural or household labor. Known as fudai no genin (譜代の下人, hereditary servants) or similar terms, they were subject to customary practices allowing their sale.) Individuals were exchanged for money, including children sold by parents, self-sold persons, those rescued from unjust execution, and debt-bound workers. Japanese rulers imposed geninka as punishment for serious crimes or rebellion, often extending it to the perpetrator's wife and children. Women who fled their fathers or husbands to seek shelter in a lord's house were sometimes transformed into genin by the lord. During famines or natural disasters, individuals offered themselves as genin in exchange for food, clothing, and shelter. Japanese lords also demanded that retainers relinquish their daughters to serve in their manors, treating them as genin. Additionally, the genin status could be hereditary, perpetuating bondage across generations.

==== Missionary interventions and the 1567 Goa council ====
The 1567 Goa Council advised missionaries to recommend the release of Japanese servants (下人) once their labor matched the compensation provided, particularly during famines or disasters when individuals offered labor for protection. The Council allowed Christians to ransom criminals sentenced to death unjustly, with the rescued serving as servants in return, since no one could be forced to provide funds without compensation. Jesuits also advised against enslaving the wives and children of punished criminals and supported freeing women who sought refuge from abusive fathers or husbands, except in cases of serious crimes, despite Japanese customs permitting their enslavement.

==== Japanese slave system and Christian critiques ====
In 1587, Japanese visitors to Manila confirmed that Japan's slave system followed the Ritsuryō legal code, where children inherited their parents' status, transferring ownership to masters. Bishop Cerqueira criticized heavy taxes by non-Christian lords that forced parents to sell children, highlighting that child sales occurred even outside extreme circumstances, which missionaries viewed as problematic.

=== The Portuguese slave trade and Jesuit efforts ===
==== Early protests and royal decrees ====
In 1555, Portuguese merchants began enslaving Japanese individuals, prompting the Jesuit order to advocate for its cessation. Their efforts led to King Sebastian I of Portugal issuing a decree in 1571 banning the Japanese slave trade. However, enforcement was weak, and the trade persisted. During the transition from the 16th to the 17th century, under the Iberian Union, King Philip II (and later Philip III of Spain) reissued the 1571 decree at the Jesuits' urging. Despite these royal mandates, local Portuguese elites fiercely opposed the bans, rendering them ineffective. The Jesuits, lacking the authority to enforce decrees, faced significant challenges in curbing the trade.

==== Jesuit reforms and humanitarian compromises ====
Valignano, the Jesuit Visitor, consistently highlighted the Japanese Jesuits' lack of authority and power to suppress the slave trade. In Portuguese India, Valignano and fellow Jesuits lacked jurisdiction to intervene in slave transactions, which were subject to secular courts. Priests were limited to providing ethical guidance, rendering the cessation of the practice unfeasible, and it persisted into the seventeenth century. In Japan, the Macao Diocese, established in 1568, oversaw Japan from 1576, but the absence of a resident bishop impeded the resolution of local issues. The Jesuits' attempt to establish an independent diocese required explicit approval from Rome.

Given the limited impact of admonitions and recommendations, missionaries sought to navigate local social dynamics within the constraints of ecclesiastical law. They categorized labor into three forms: servitude equivalent to slavery, a tolerable non-slavery condition, and an unacceptable state. This distinction is believed to have led missionaries to reluctantly acquiesce to local customs. Furthermore, missionaries critical of the Portuguese slave trade in Japan, unable to directly prevent Portuguese merchants' slave purchases due to insufficient authority, advocated for reframing Japan's prevalent perpetual human trafficking as a form of indentured servitude (yearly contract labor) to align with local practices while mitigating the harshest aspects of exploitation.

Recognizing their limited power, the Jesuits sought to reform Japan's system of perpetual slavery (永代人身売買) into indentured servitude (年季奉公). Some missionaries, driven by humanitarian concerns, signed short-term ownership certificates (schedulae) to prevent the greater harm of lifelong enslavement. This pragmatic approach, however, was controversial. By 1598, missionary participation in such practices was banned. Critics like Mateus de Couros condemned any involvement, even if motivated by compassion, highlighting the moral complexities of the Jesuits' position. The practice of issuing permits for temporary servitude in Japan, recognized as early as 1568 with Melchior Carneiro's arrival in Macao, gained official or local acknowledgment. The intervention of missionaries in Japan, particularly in issuing short-term permits, likely peaked between 1568 and the period following the 1587 Bateren Edict, when permit issuance requirements became stricter or were increasingly restrained.

Some Japanese chose servitude to travel to Macau or due to poverty, but many indentured servants in Macau broke contracts by fleeing to Ming territory, reducing Portuguese slave purchases. Poverty, driven by lords' tax demands, led some to view slavery as a survival strategy, with peasants offering themselves or others as collateral for unpaid taxes, blurring the line between farmers and slaves.

Jesuit-established organizations, such as confraternities and the Nagasaki Misericórdia (almshouse), undertook efforts to rescue Japanese slaves, particularly women, from ships and brothels. The memoirs of Afonso de Lucena and letters of Luis Fróis concur regarding the treatment of captives during the Battle of Nagayo Castle in March 1587, reflecting Lucena's concerns about their legitimacy. After Christmas 1586, Lucena urged Ōmura Sumitada, whose health was failing, to free unjustly held captives, leveraging the threat of withholding confession. The Jesuits strategically withheld confession or sacraments to compel moral conduct, especially among influential converts.

Moreover, bishops and their representatives condemned brothels and private prostitution as "workshops of the devil". The fourth article of the Constitutions of Goa (1568) prohibited brothel ownership and operation, imposing fines and public shaming on violators, while mandating the liberation of slaves coerced into prostitution. Thus, the Jesuits endeavored to eradicate immoral practices like prostitution while advancing slave rescue and evangelization through conversion.

==== Adapting to local realities ====
The Jesuits, previously constrained by limited authority in Japan, experienced a pivotal shift with Pedro Martins' consecration as bishop in 1592 (Note: Pedro Martins is considered to be the first bishop to reside in Japan. Sebastian de Morais was appointed as the first bishop of the Funai Diocese in 1588, but he died of illness during his voyage to Japan.) and his arrival in Nagasaki in 1596. As the first high-ranking cleric in Japan since Francisco Xavier, Martins acquired the authority to excommunicate Portuguese merchants engaged in the trade of Japanese and Korean slaves. However, the Jesuits' dependence on financial support from the Captain-major and the bishop's limited secular authority posed challenges. The Captain-major, as the supreme representative of Portuguese royal authority in Japan, held significant power; opposing him without royal endorsement made excommunication theoretically feasible but practically uncertain. Ultimately, Martins, alarmed by the social disruption caused by the trade in Japanese and Korean slaves, resolved to pronounce excommunication against human trafficking. After his death, Bishop Cerqueira reinforced this anti-slavery policy, referring the issue, which required secular authority, to the Portuguese crown. After 1598, Bishop Luís de Cerqueira intensified pressure on Spanish and Portuguese authorities to abolish temporary servitude of Japanese and Korean individuals, but the Portuguese slave trade reportedly grew.

The Jesuits' efforts to combat the Japanese slave trade reflect a struggle between moral conviction and practical limitations. Despite securing royal decrees and attempting reforms, they faced resistance from Portuguese elites and the realities of Japan's socio-political context.

=== Christian iconoclasm ===
==== Jesuit opposition and convert zeal ====
The Jesuits, under leaders like Francisco Cabral and Alessandro Valignano, officially opposed the destruction of Buddhist temples and Shinto shrines by Christian converts, deeming such acts counterproductive to their missionary goals. However, zealous converts, particularly in agricultural and fishing communities, viewed traditional institutions as complicit in feudal oppression, leading to violent iconoclasm in regions like Nagasaki and Kumamoto, where temples and shrines were destroyed. While the Jesuits prioritized converting the ruling class to gain influence, the fervor of lower-class converts often resulted in destructive acts, straining the mission's relationship with Japanese authorities. Historians like Andre C. Ross note uncertainty about direct responsibility, but Jesuit leaders consistently advocated accommodation with Japanese customs to maintain the mission's viability.

==== Evidence and challenges in historical records ====
Luís Fróis's História de Japam, a key source on Christian iconoclasm, is considered unreliable due to its tendency to compress events across years into brief accounts, making contemporary missionary letters a more trustworthy source. These letters document significant acts, such as the establishment of the Todos-os-Santos Church in 1569, built by Jesuit priest Gaspar Vilela using materials from a dismantled Buddhist temple donated by Nagasaki Jinzaemon Sumikage. This act symbolized the Christian mission's impact on local religious landscapes, with reports of other destroyed religious sites, possibly small prayer spaces in fishing villages. (Note: As missionary records do not mention the shrines in Nagasaki noted in Japanese sources, those shrines could have been abandoned or deteriorated due to natural exposure before the port town's establishment.) The motives—whether missionary zeal, retaliations of converts escaping persecution, peasant uprisings, or daimyo's public safety and defense strategies—remain debated due to limited corroborating evidence. Missionary letters focus on Christian activities but lack local perspectives, while Japanese sources, written during the anti-Christian Tokugawa period, are biased and temporally distant. Notably, daimyo like Ōmura Sumitada, who sheltered Christians in 1569, often maintained a dual identity as both Christians and Buddhists, as evidenced by his tonsure in the Shingon Buddhist sect around 1574, reflecting a pluralist coexistence of faiths.

Many temples and shrines maintain traditions, compiled much later, claiming destruction by a Christian daimyo during the Tenshō era. However, primary sources from before the Tenshō period, intact Buddhist statues, and on-site investigations reveal no evidence of such destruction in many cases. Scholars suggest these incidents likely resulted from negotiations. Contemporary records, including letters securing temple lands, indicate that Sengoku-era Christian daimyo prioritized strategic alliances, protecting influential temples and villages to enhance their authority, with religious considerations being of minor importance.

=== Christian churches and repurposed spaces ===
==== Acquisition and repurposing of religious sites ====
Churches in 16th-century Japan were often established through donations or purchases, frequently facilitated by Christian daimyo like Ōmura Sumitada. The instability of the Sengoku period and Oda Nobunaga's attacks on religious institutions, such as the 1571 burning of Enryakuji, weakened many Buddhist temples, prompting monks to sell them to missionaries for survival. Jesuit missionaries, supported by local lords, repurposed non-sacred and abandoned spaces for Christian worship. For example, in 1555, Ōtomo Sōrin in Funai, Bungo, donated a field for a house with an integrated chapel and funded a large estate for a new church. In 1576, Arima Yoshisada provided a non-Christian temple, reused as a church without modifications. Churches were also established within castles, such as Ichiki Tsurumaru in Satsuma and Sawa in Yamato (modern Nara), linked to Takayama Tomoteru. Many of repurposed Buddhist temples were already abandoned due to the period's instability, with local authorities' permission and donations from Christian daimyo and Portuguese traders being essential for acquiring these sites.

==== Jesuit management and local adaptation ====
During Alessandro Valignano's tenure, most Catholic construction projects in Japan were overseen by Japanese lords, who were instrumental in expanding building efforts. Valignano advocated for respecting local architectural traditions and consulting native master builders, ensuring adaptability in construction. This approach allowed Japanese builders to maintain their organization, resources, and techniques throughout the first and second stages of evangelization, aligning Christian structures with local practices while supporting the mission's growth.

=== Hostility and misconceptions surrounding missionaries ===
==== Defamatory rumors and xenophobic hostility ====
Social perceptions of missionaries in 16th-century Japan were shaped by vicious rumors that fueled widespread hostility. Fernão Guerreiro's Jesuit Annual Report details relentless harassment, including acts like throwing corpses at priests' doorways to spread claims that missionaries consumed human flesh, inciting hatred and disgust among locals. Other rumors alleged missionaries ate children or extracted eyeballs for sorcery, while Ōmura Yoshimi's Kyushu Godōzaki claimed they skinned and ate livestock alive. Historian Akio Okada attributes these slanders to xenophobic fears, portraying foreigners, especially missionaries, as mystical agents of death and destruction. In 1553, rumors of missionary cannibalism surfaced in Bungo, prompting local lord Ōtomo Sōrin to issue an edict prohibiting people from throwing stones at missionary houses.

==== Persecution and resistance to Christian conversion ====
The conversion of Ōmura Sumitada, Japan's first Christian daimyō, to Christianity in 1563, under the baptismal name Dom Bartolomeu, triggered intense opposition. Buddhist monks incited a rebellion that led to the burning of a monastery and the homes of Christian farmers at Yokoseura Port, reducing much of the port to ashes. In a 1564 letter, missionary Luis de Almeida reported that Arima Haruzumi ordered the destruction of Christian crosses in his domain and demanded that Christians revert to their former beliefs. The persecution escalated in 1573 when Fukahori Sumikata burned down the Todos os Santos Church, intensifying efforts to suppress the growing Christian influence in Japan.

=== Jesuit colleges, seminaries, and the introduction of Western science and human rights ===
Jesuit colleges in Funai (modern Ōita) and Amakusa introduced a curriculum blending European liberal arts with Japanese language and culture, led by figures like Pedro Gómez, Vice-Provincial from 1590 to 1600. Gómez's Compendium Catholicae Veritatis (1593), translated into Japanese by 1595, covered Aristotelian cosmology (De Sphaera), philosophy of the soul (De Anima), and post-Tridentine theology (De Sacra Scriptura).

The Painting Seminary in Shiki, Amakusa, under Giovanni Niccolò, taught European techniques like chiaroscuro and linear perspective, attracting both Christians and non-Christians, including Buddhist dōjuku, and disseminating Western visual culture and technologies such as printing presses and astronomical tools. European music, including harpsichords and organs, was also integrated into Christian rituals.

The introduction of Christian cosmology, particularly the spherical earth, challenged Buddhist and neo-Confucian worldviews. Texts like Johannes de Sacrobosco's Tractatus de Sphaera and Christophorus Clavius's commentaries introduced Ptolemaic astronomy and Aristotelian physics. These ideas, propagated through Matteo Ricci's world maps, sparked intellectual debates, notably in the 1606 dialogue attributed to Hayashi Razan, who defended neo-Confucian flat-earth cosmology against the Jesuit spherical-earth model, arguing that Confucian fixed cardinal points were more rational. This cosmological clash indirectly engaged ethical concepts, as the Jesuit curriculum introduced the Roman Law-based notion of jiyū (liberty) as civic freedom, distinct from the Buddhist sense of self-mastery and the neo-Confucian order of "above and below" articulated by Hayashi.

Despite the 1614 proscription of Christianity and the 1621 closure of Jesuit schools, their educational legacy endured. Gómez's Compendium influenced later Japanese scholarship, reappearing as Nigi Ryakusetsu by Kobayashi Kentei in the late 17th century.

Matteo Ricci further contributed by integrating mathematical and scientific knowledge. Ricci, alongside Chinese collaborators, edited compendia of theological and scientific texts that included translations of the first six books of Euclid's Elements, serving as foundational mathematical resources. (Note: While not explicitly documented as primary textbooks in Japanese Jesuit colleges or seminaries during the period, Ricci's works aligned with the broader Jesuit pedagogical emphasis on astronomy, cosmography, and mathematics, as seen in Gómez's Compendium, which drew on similar European sources.) In later periods, Ricci's influence persisted beyond the 17th-century expulsions: his maps inspired Japanese folding screens. Even into the 19th century, Japanese scholars like Fumon Entsū (1810) analyzed Ricci's cosmography alongside figures like Copernicus, demonstrating enduring posthumous impact on Japanese intellectual engagement with Western science.

== Toyotomi Hideyoshi ==
=== Bateren Edict ===
The Bateren Edict, issued by Toyotomi Hideyoshi on June 19, 1587, was a decree ordering the expulsion of Christian missionaries (referred to as "bateren", from the Portuguese padre) from Japan. Promulgated during Hideyoshi's campaign to unify Kyushu, the edict was a response to several perceived threats posed by Christianity.

In 1587, while trying to establish control of his new kingdom in some parts of Kyushu, he encountered Buddhist temples that had been sacked by Catholic forces attempting to convert the entire island by force. This attempted purge of Buddhism from Kyushu had begun years earlier, in 1562, with the conversion of Omura Sumitada, Japan's first Roman Catholic daimyo, who began a scorched earth campaign against local Buddhists and their places of worship, despite Jesuits advising him to not destroy Shinto and Buddhist temples. This added to Hideyoshi's suspicion of the religion.

==== Events leading to the Jesuit expulsion ====
In 1586, Gaspar Coelho, Vice-Provincial of the Jesuit Order, departed Nagasaki on March 6 and arrived in Sakai around April 25 after approximately fifty days of travel. Upon arrival, Coelho ignored an envoy from Satsuma, who likely sought to enforce existing directives compelling his return to Nagasaki. Instead, he allied with Ōtomo Sōrin, who requested military support from Toyotomi Hideyoshi against the Shimazu and Ryūzōji clans. This strategic decision to evade Satsuma's influence entailed considerable risks: a Shimazu victory could have led to Coelho's execution and the expulsion of the Jesuits from Kyushu.

On May 4, 1586, Coelho met Toyotomi Hideyoshi at Osaka Castle, accompanied by over thirty Jesuit priests and attendants. The meeting initially proceeded cordially, with Hideyoshi seated approximately one meter from Coelho and his interpreter, Luís Fróis. Hideyoshi commended the Jesuits' dedication to propagating their doctrine, though this praise may have implicitly cautioned against involvement in secular matters. He outlined his political ambitions: unifying Japan, establishing enduring peace, delegating governance to his brother, Toyotomi Hidenaga, and pursuing the conquest of Korea and China. To support these objectives, Hideyoshi requested Jesuit assistance in procuring two armed carrack ships, offering payment in silver and promising land and income for Portuguese crew members. In exchange, he pledged to permit church construction in conquered Chinese territories, mandate conversions to Christianity, and promote widespread conversions in Japan. Additionally, he suggested ceding Hizen Province in Kyushu to Kirishitan daimyo, such as Takayama Ukon and Konishi Yukinaga, while assuring that Nagasaki would be entrusted to the Church.

Eager to gain Hideyoshi's favor, Coelho abandoned the Jesuits' traditional prudence, imprudently committing to provide the requested ships and additional Portuguese military support—promises he lacked the authority or resources to fulfill. More critically, Coelho, unprompted, pledged to mobilize Kyushu's Kirishitan daimyo to counter Shimazu influence, a political intervention that explicitly contravened the Jesuit leadership's prohibition against regional political involvement. His failure to secure the promised warships may have fostered Hideyoshi's distrust.

On July 15, 1587, Toyotomi Hideyoshi inspected an armed ship (fusta) constructed by Jesuit Vice-Provincial Gaspar Coelho at his request in Hakata and demanded its presentation. Having granted land revenue rights to the Jesuits and Christian daimyo, Hideyoshi imposed on the Jesuits the obligation to accept his judicial authority. Consequently, Konishi Yukinaga and Kuroda Yoshitaka advised compliance, but Coelho refused. Additionally, Hideyoshi ordered Portuguese ships anchored in Hirado to relocate to Hakata, a demand rejected on July 24 by Portuguese captain Domingos Monteiro, who cited the port's unsuitability.

These refusals were perceived as affronts to Hideyoshi's authority, intensifying his discontent. This dissatisfaction, fueled by the counsel of his physician, Seyakuin Zenshu, prompted decisive action. Motivated by personal animosity toward Takayama Ukon for a prior slight, Seyakuin urged Hideyoshi to test Ukon's loyalty and escalate pressure on the Jesuits and Christians. Addressing Ukon, Hideyoshi positioned himself as the protector of the Emperor and the imperial court, signaling a deliberate plan to expel the Jesuits . On July 22, one week after Hideyoshi's visit, Takayama Ukon visited the fusta ship and warned Coelho directly, expressing certainty that a grave calamity threatened the Church in Japan.

===== Hideyoshi's three questions and proposals =====
On the night of July 24, Hideyoshi dispatched a messenger to Coelho with three questions and proposals, articulating his suspicions about Christian activities. Historians interpret these as the "three proposals", reflecting Hideyoshi's economic and political concerns:

- Why do missionaries actively promote conversions in Japan and relocate populations to other regions? Should they not preach in temples like other sectarian monks? (Proposal: Restrict proselytization to Kyushu temples or return to Macao. If the latter, churches in Kyoto, Osaka, and Sakai will be confiscated, with 10,000 koku of rice offered as compensation) .
- Why do they consume cows and horses, critical resources for agriculture and warfare? (Proposal: Cease consumption of cows and horses, with wild game provided as a substitute) .
- Why do Portuguese, Siamese, and Cambodians purchase Japanese slaves and export them? (Proposal: Return slaves; if distant repatriations are infeasible, liberate them immediately and compensate for the silver paid).

On July 25, the messenger posed an additional question about the destruction of temples and shrines and the persecution of monks, underscoring Hideyoshi's broader distrust of Jesuit activities.

===== Coelho's responses =====
Unable to engage directly with Hideyoshi and wary of the messenger's potential to misrelay responses due to fear of Hideyoshi's wrath, as well as skepticism about Hideyoshi's reliability, Coelho provided concise replies. According to Luís Fróis, the Jesuits distrusted Hideyoshi's proposals and opted for succinct answers to mitigate risks of miscommunication. While pragmatic, this brevity may have been perceived as inadequate. The responses from July 24–25 are detailed below:

- Conversion Methods: Missionaries aim to save souls through peaceful persuasion, not coercion. As Christianity is new in Japan, foreign missionaries must travel to proselytize, unlike temple-bound monks of other sects. Hideyoshi's proposal would curtail the Jesuits' mission, necessitating continued itinerant preaching.
- Consumption of Cows and Horses: Missionaries and Portuguese do not eat horse meat. Beef consumption reflects European dietary norms but is adapted to Japanese cuisine outside Kyushu. Portuguese merchants may consume meat upon arrival, but this can cease at Hideyoshi's request. The Jesuits lack authority over Japanese meat vendors but pledged to relay Hideyoshi's concerns to Portuguese merchants.
- Slave Trade: Missionaries morally oppose the slave trade, which is conducted by Japanese traffickers beyond Jesuit control. The issue is acute in Kyushu but less prevalent in Honshu. Despite past efforts to curb the trade, the Jesuits have been unsuccessful. Coelho suggested Hideyoshi impose strict prohibitions on daimyo. Regarding Hideyoshi's proposal, Coelho noted the Jesuits' lack of authority over Portuguese merchants, neither endorsing nor rejecting the plan, and instead advocated for daimyo-led regulation of Japanese traffickers.
- Temple and Shrine Destruction (July 25): Missionaries lack political authority, and temple destruction or monk persecution stems from spontaneous acts by Japanese converts, beyond Jesuit control.

These responses clarified the Jesuits' limited influence but failed to alleviate Hideyoshi's suspicions. Later, Hideyoshi reneged on compensating Portuguese merchants for returned slaves, validating Coelho's distrust of his promises.

===== Intent and context of the three questions =====
Hideyoshi's questions were strategic, prioritizing Kyushu's economic and political stability over moral concerns . Conversions caused labor outflows to Christian daimyo domains (e.g., Yokoseura, Nagasaki), creating regional imbalances. The slave trade depleted Kyushu's workforce, while cow and horse consumption undermined agricultural and military resources.

The proposals aligned with contemporary negotiation practices, such as prohibitions and repatriation orders, to secure economic stability. Repatriation orders sought to return not only war- or trade-abducted subjects but also farmers who migrated voluntarily, ensuring labor availability. Following the Shimazu clan's surrender in April 1587, Hideyoshi issued a repatriation order to restore civilians to their original domains, delegating slave trade issues to Jesuit negotiations. Coelho's responses, particularly on the slave trade, avoided clear commitment, citing lack of authority over Japanese and Portuguese traders, and proposed daimyo regulations instead.

===== Negotiation breakdown and expulsion order =====
The Jesuits' attempts to meet Hideyoshi from July 9–15 failed, but a "planned coincidence" of positioning their ship on his inspection route secured meetings on July 15–16. Coelho sought Hakata church reconstruction, but events escalated on July 24–25 with ship relocation refusals, Ukon's expulsion, the execution of Yellow Robe Corps members, and the expulsion order.

Hideyoshi's distrust arose from Christianity's economic and political impacts: labor mobility from conversions, workforce depletion via the slave trade, and resource loss from livestock consumption. These concerns culminated in the July 23 memorandum (banning slave trade) and July 24 expulsion order. The order triggered church destruction and persecution, though complete expulsion within 20 days proved impractical. Konishi Yukinaga highlighted enforcement challenges, but Seyakuin Zenshu advocated harshly, suggesting remaining missionaries be "thrown into the sea".

Hideyoshi's proposals prioritized Kyushu's stability. Coelho's responses, aiming to preserve Jesuit influence, avoided clear commitments, especially on the slave trade, citing limited authority and proposing daimyo regulations. This ambiguity failed to address Hideyoshi's concerns, leading to negotiation collapse. Coelho's underestimation of Hideyoshi's authority and prioritization of missionary networks precipitated the expulsion.

=== Discussion on the causes of the Bateren Expulsion Edict ===
==== Shinkoku and religious nativism ====
Hideyoshi declared Japan a "Land of the Gods" (Shinkoku), arguing that Christian teachings were a pernicious doctrine incompatible with Japan's syncretic religious traditions, which blended Shinto, Buddhism, and Confucianism. His push for deification after death likely fueled his religious nativism, as he might fear any obstacles to his own divinization as an absolute ruler.

==== Military strategy and foreign policy ====
The Bateren Edict, which expelled missionaries, banned missionary activities, and pressured Christian daimyo to abandon their faith, was a key part of Hideyoshi's military and diplomatic strategy. This strategy, justified by his claimed divine right as the Child of the Sun, aimed at future conquests of the Philippines, India, and Europe, with missionaries and Christian daimyo seen as potential obstacles.

Toyotomi Hideyoshi, after consolidating power in Japan by 1585, harbored ambitions to expand Japanese influence abroad. In 1585, as Kampaku, Hideyoshi articulated ambitions to invade China to address resource shortages, later expanding to Korea, the Philippines, India. He claimed divine legitimacy, asserting that his mother dreamt she carried the Sun in her womb when he was born, an auspicious sign that he would "radiate virtue and rule the four seas"(Zoku Zenrin Kokuhoki). Hideyoshi's vision included relocating the Japanese emperor to Beijing, appointing his nephew as regent of China, and establishing himself in Ningbo to oversee further conquests, including India, and Europe. These plans were driven by a desire for economic gain, territorial expansion, and recognition from foreign rulers, rather than purely military motives. The 1592 invasion of Korea, involving over 160,000 troops, was a step toward this goal but ultimately failed after six years, ending with Hideyoshi's death in 1598.

Fears of a Japanese invasion of the Philippines were recorded as early as 1586, with Spanish authorities in Manila noting Japanese espionage activities and preparing defenses against potential attacks. Toyotomi Hideyoshi's 1586 request to Gaspar Coelho for Portuguese warships to aid his planned invasion of Ming China signaled his expansionist ambitions. The Spanish, aware of these plans, grew wary of Japanese activities in the vulnerable Philippines colony, leading to a 1586 Manila council memorial documenting concerns about Japanese colonization and prompting defensive measures.

==== Portuguese slave trade and meat eating ====
The Jesuits established confraternities and the Nagasaki Misericórdia (almshouse), rescuing Japanese slaves, particularly women, from brothels and ships, and aiming to eradicate immoral practices through Christian evangelization. As part of these efforts, missionaries pressed Ōmura Sumitada to release unjustly held captives by leveraging the withholding of confession, promoting ethical conduct and highlighting criticism of the human trafficking practices tolerated in Japan. The fourth article of the Constitutions of Goa prohibited brothel operations, imposing penalties on violators and mandating the liberation of slaves coerced into prostitution, thereby demonstrating the Jesuits' commitment to moral reform. These consistent efforts to improve slave treatment and rescue women stood in stark contrast to the widespread practice of slave trading in Japan at the time. Hideyoshi's expulsion edict did not target Portuguese merchants, the primary agents of the slave trade, suggesting that the edict may have been a hypocritical pretext for expelling missionaries.

Following the Bateren Expulsion Edict, in 1589 (Tenshō 17), Toyotomi Hideyoshi ordered the establishment of the Yanagihara pleasure quarter in Kyoto. Regarded as Japan's first pleasure quarter, this marked the formalization of the yūkaku system, yet it became a hotbed for human trafficking by procurers. According to the June 1597 records of Florentine traveler Francesco Carletti, who visited Japan, the conditions for women in Portuguese Macao and Nagasaki presented a stark contrast. In Macao, Chinese women were described as possessing "beautiful and refined features", but strict restrictions prevented interactions with them. In contrast, in Hideyoshi-controlled Nagasaki, prostitution was openly practiced, and procurers offered women as commodities to arriving sailors, with human trafficking rampant. This suggests that Hideyoshi tacitly condoned domestic human trafficking, and the double standards or hypocritical attitude implied by this indicate that the expulsion edict's motives were likely rooted in factors other than the slave trade itself.

The edict was partly motivated by the depletion of Kyushu's labor force due to the Portuguese slave trade and meat eating, which Hideyoshi saw as detrimental to the local economy. (Note: Historian Rômulo da Silva Ehalt argues that human trafficking predated Portuguese arrival in Japan and was widely known across the archipelago, challenging Okamoto Yoshitomo's claim that Hideyoshi, enraged by discovering the slave trade, issued the Bateren Expulsion Order out of moral outrage. Instead, Hideyoshi's interrogatory reveals his primary concerns were economic, such as labor shortages in Kyushu and the influence of Jesuit missionaries, rather than ethical issues. Hideyoshi ordered the return of displaced people—whether trafficked, kidnapped, or voluntarily fled—to their fiefs to stabilize agricultural production, a policy applied nationwide, not just in Kyushu. He also expressed concerns about meat consumption depleting livestock essential for agriculture and war, offering to build a facility for foreigners to consume hunted animals if missionaries couldn't abstain from meat. These actions reflect Hideyoshi's focus on consolidating control and ensuring economic stability.) Although an earlier memorandum included references to the slave trade, the final edict omitted these, focusing instead on religious and political issues. The total number of Japanese slaves purchased or contracted by the Portuguese after their arrival is estimated to range from hundreds to thousands, and the economic impact is believed to have been exaggerated beyond its actual extent.

His tolerance of abductions and enslavement during the Japanese invasions of Korea (1592–1598), driven by daimyo plundering for profit, reveals his complicity in human trafficking. While he criticized missionaries and European traders for enslaving Japanese people abroad, his own actions in Korea, which involved much more violent practices, highlight a moral contradiction noted by historians. His condemnation of Christianity lacked ethical consistency, as his primary concern was preventing Japan's humiliation by foreign powers, not opposing slavery itself. Hideyoshi's worldview justified this asymmetry: The expansion of Japan's cultural sphere through invasion and wartime atrocities such as the enslavement of non-Japanese were justified as necessary and honorable, while cultural and commercial frictions with foreign entities were regarded as unforgivable deviations or acts of aggression. The expulsion edict was likely influenced by an ethnocentric belief in Japan's divine superiority and the perceived inferiority of foreign cultures, suggesting a xenophobic bias and double standard in policy.

==== Political threat ====
Ōmura Sumitada donated Nagasaki to the Jesuits for personal benefit, retaining control as the town and Jesuits remained loyal. He granted perpetual usage rights and extraterritorial privileges in return for securing permanent port customs and entry taxes, with designated officials stationed to oversee their collection. Suspicions that Christian daimyo were ceding control to foreign powers raised concerns about undermining Hideyoshi's authority. If Sumitada suspected a Spanish takeover or fort, he would have reacted harshly, like Hideyoshi against the friars. Missionaries noted such an invasion was impossible, or the donation would not have happened. Ties with Portuguese traders fueled fears of foreign interference, though concerns of a Christian "fifth column" were exaggerated, as Portuguese Macau and Spanish Manila lacked the capacity to challenge Japan.

George Sansom notes that the teachings of Christianity challenged social hierarchies and existing political structures, analyzing the Bateren Edict as a visceral defensive reaction by Toyotomi Hideyoshi, who, from the perspective of a dictator and autocrat, feared missionaries not merely as heretics but as a force undermining the foundation of social order. The Christian-influenced legal code in Nagasaki, blending Japanese customs with milder punishments and separating civil, criminal, ecclesiastical, and secular cases, implicitly challenged Hideyoshi's absolute authority as a dictator by undermining his rigid control over Japan's social-political order.

Seventeenth-century anti-Christian literature highlights several objectionable actions attributed to missionaries:

They sent out men to search throughout the Capital and its outskirts, in wayside chapels in the hills and plains, and even underneath bridges. They gathered in outcasts and beggars and others with diseases and afflictions, had them take a bath and cleanse the body, and gave them clothing, succor, shelter, and care.

The Jesuit missionaries' operation of hospitals for hinin and the gravely ill, involving contact with socially 'impure' lower strata such as those afflicted with leprosy, scurvy, or disabilities, led to their perception by the upper classes, including samurai and monks, as contaminated and marginal beings, resulting in their avoidance and alienation.

Moreover, an arrow unearthed during the 1637 Shimabara Rebellion bore the inscription, "Among all sentient beings there is no such distinction as noble and base." Historian George Elison notes that, although not a direct teaching of the missionaries, this egalitarian sentiment reflects how Christian proselytization introduced ideas at odds with Japan's rigid social hierarchy. Such ideas were perceived as a latent threat to Toyotomi Hideyoshi's political authority and social order, contributing to the justification for the expulsion order.

==== Iconoclasm ====
The destruction of Buddhist temples and Shinto shrines by Christian converts, particularly in Kyushu, was cited as a grievance, though Hideyoshi's own history of attacking Buddhist institutions suggests this was a pretext. The destructions were confined to specific territories and not a nationwide phenomenon. Jesuit leaders promoted restraint, allowing Christianity to coexist with hostile local religions in many areas. Hideyoshi exaggerated the political significance of limited temple and shrine destructions, portraying them as a national humiliation. Historically, such destruction was not widespread, and the narrative of its prevalence was amplified by Hideyoshi's strategic biases.

The Jesuit Provincial Francisco Cabral and Visitor Alessandro Valignano, succeeding Cosme de Torres, officially opposed iconoclasm as counterproductive to missionary work. The existence of large-scale destruction following Valignano's appointment as Visitor is questioned, and claims of widespread Jesuit-led iconoclasm lack evidence. Christian daimyo, such as Sumitada Ōmura, blended Christian and Buddhist identities, as seen in his 1574 tonsure in the Shingon sect. They likely permitted temple destruction for strategic purposes, not purely religious motives.

==== Nanban trade ====
The edict banned Christian missionary work but welcomed trade with Christian domains to secure a trade monopoly and strengthen his power. Hideyoshi later seized Nagasaki, one of the Japan's wealthiest trading port, along with Mogi and Urakami from the Ōmura and Arima clans, destroyed churches, and fined residents heavily. Historian Fujino Tamotsu notes that Hideyoshi made Nagasaki a directly controlled territory to monopolize its unparalleled trade profits.

=== Invasions of Korea and thriving slave trade ===
Hideyoshi's 1587 Bateren Edict, driven by economic concerns over labor depletion rather than moral objections, as historians like Maki Hidemasa and Romulo Ehalt noted, briefly curtailed slave trades. However, his 1597 second invasion of Korea actively endorsed the slave trade, transforming it into a major industry. Japanese slave traders captured approximately 50,000 to 60,000 Koreans as prisoners, with only 7,500 returning to Korea through postwar diplomatic efforts. Bishop Pedro Martins resolved to excommunicate Portuguese merchants involved in the trade of Japanese and Korean slaves, even for temporary servitude, a stance later strengthened by Bishop Cerqueira. Contemporary sources describe a "gruesome scenario" where Japanese merchants brought crowds of Korean prisoners to islands for sale to Portuguese merchants.

The Portuguese merchants, by conducting transactions on these islands, evaded the prohibition in Macau and the excommunication by Bishop Martins. While the Jesuits completely withdrew their desperate measure of regulating the slave trade of Portuguese merchants and made a strong statement that they would not relent in excommunicating merchants outside their jurisdiction, Hideyoshi's policies encouraged the enslavement of Koreans, effectively nullifying the previous restrictions. The 1592 Dochirina Kirishitan emphasized redeeming captives as a Christian duty, rooted in Christ's atonement, yet Jesuits lacked the authority to enforce the prohibition of slavery, as Valignano repeatedly argued. Since their arrival in Japan, the Portuguese are estimated to have traded hundreds to thousands of Japanese slaves. However, the number of Korean slaves brought to Japan significantly exceeded this figure.

=== San Felipe incident ===
The turning point for Catholic missions was the San Felipe incident in 1596, where, in an attempt to recover his cargo, the Spanish captain (Note: The information attributed to the ship’s captain is likely inaccurate. According to other studies, the sole source of the claim that a member of the San Felipe’s crew made statements about missionaries being the "vanguard of invasion" is a Jesuit report, which identifies Francisco de Olandia, a pilot (navigator), rather than the captain, as the speaker. The attribution to Michael Cooper's 1974 biography, Rodrigues the Interpreter: An Early Jesuit in Japan and China, as a source for this report is considered unreliable.) of a shipwrecked trading vessel alleged that the missionaries were there to prepare Japan for conquest. However, no definitive historical assessment exists regarding the veracity of this claim, as no direct eyewitness accounts or documents have been preserved. Recent scholarship does not support the hypothesis that hearsay information, in the absence of the involved parties, was the primary cause of Hideyoshi's subsequent persecution of missionaries. According to Michael Cooper, these claims deepened Hideyoshi's suspicions of the foreign religion. (Note: In the period following the San Felipe incident (1596), the perspective, purportedly propagated by the Jesuits, that Franciscan missionary activities served as the "vanguard" of Spanish imperial conquest tends to oversimplify historical complexities. In the colonial endeavors of Portugal and Spain, missionary activities did not precede military conquest but rather followed it, and at times, they even conflicted with the political and military objectives of the empire. The concept of "spiritual conquest", thoroughly explored by French historian Robert Ricard in his 1933 study, analyzes the methods and dynamics of Christianization in Spanish and Portuguese America, challenging earlier simplistic interpretations. Recent scholarship has found little historical support for the view that missionaries acted as the "vanguard of invasion," and the hypothesis that Christianization preceded military and political conquest lacks academic endorsement.) From then on, he attempted to curb Catholicism while also maintaining good trading relations with Portugal and Spain, who may have provided military support to Dom Justo Takayama, a Christian daimyō in western Japan.

In 1596, the Spanish ship San Felipe ran aground in Japan, and its pilot, Francisco de Olandia, allegedly boasted about Spanish colonial ambitions, prompting Hideyoshi to execute 26 Christians in Nagasaki in 1597. No primary sources confirm Olandia's testimony, and tensions between Portuguese Jesuits and Spanish Franciscans intensified, with each blaming the other for the martyrdoms. Concerns about a Christian 'fifth column' were overstated, as Portuguese Macau and Spanish Manila lacked the resources and influence to pose a significant threat to Japan. Whether Toyotomi Hideyoshi genuinely believed in these unrealistic threats remains a subject of academic debate.

According to Luis Frois's History of Japan, before the 1587 Edict of Expulsion and prior to the San Felipe incident, Toyotomi Hideyoshi suspected that missionaries were conspiring to use Christian daimyo to conquer Japan, alleging they employed sophisticated knowledge and cunning methods to win over Japanese nobles and elites with a unity stronger than the Ikkō sect, aiming to occupy and conquer Japan. Frois's account is not definitive history but reflects Jesuit perspectives on Hideyoshi's suspicions. Historian Elisonas notes Hideyoshi's skepticism toward Jesuit Coelho's authoritative tone with daimyo. The concern that Christians were being used as "vanguards of invasion" stemmed from a widely circulated conspiracy theory, as evidenced in a 1578 letter by Luís Fróis. According to Boxer, this conspiracy theory had been propagated by monks since at least 1570. While figures such as Ōtomo and Oda Nobunaga dismissed it outright, Boxer speculates that Hideyoshi may have been influenced by such theories.

Spanish merchants alleged Jesuits, including Martins, Organtino, and Rodrigues, described Spaniards to Hideyoshi's minister as pirates and the Spanish king as a tyrant, claims Rodrigues denied. These accusations and the Jesuits' perception of Hideyoshi's suspicions may have led the Jesuits to craft self-defensive narratives, a possibility that remains plausible. Boxer highlights a discrepancy: eyewitness Fray Juan Pobre asserted that the seizure was decided before the pilot's interrogation, contradicting Jesuit accounts. Elison (Elisonas) argues that the Franciscan account is more plausible, but acknowledges that its veracity cannot be definitively confirmed.

Hideyoshi ordered the execution of 26 Christians in Nagasaki, known as the 26 Martyrs of Japan. Triggered by a lavish Franciscan church in Kyoto, seen as lèse-majesty, the initial target of 170 was reduced to 26. The Nanbanji temple was dismantled, but smaller churches remained, and no further major restrictions were imposed, indicating Hideyoshi's focus was on authority, not eradicating Christianity, mirroring his approach to Buddhist institutions. The notion of a Christian fifth column lacks strong evidence, as the charge was specifically lèse-majesty, not a broader conspiratorial threat.

=== Persecution and martyrdom ===
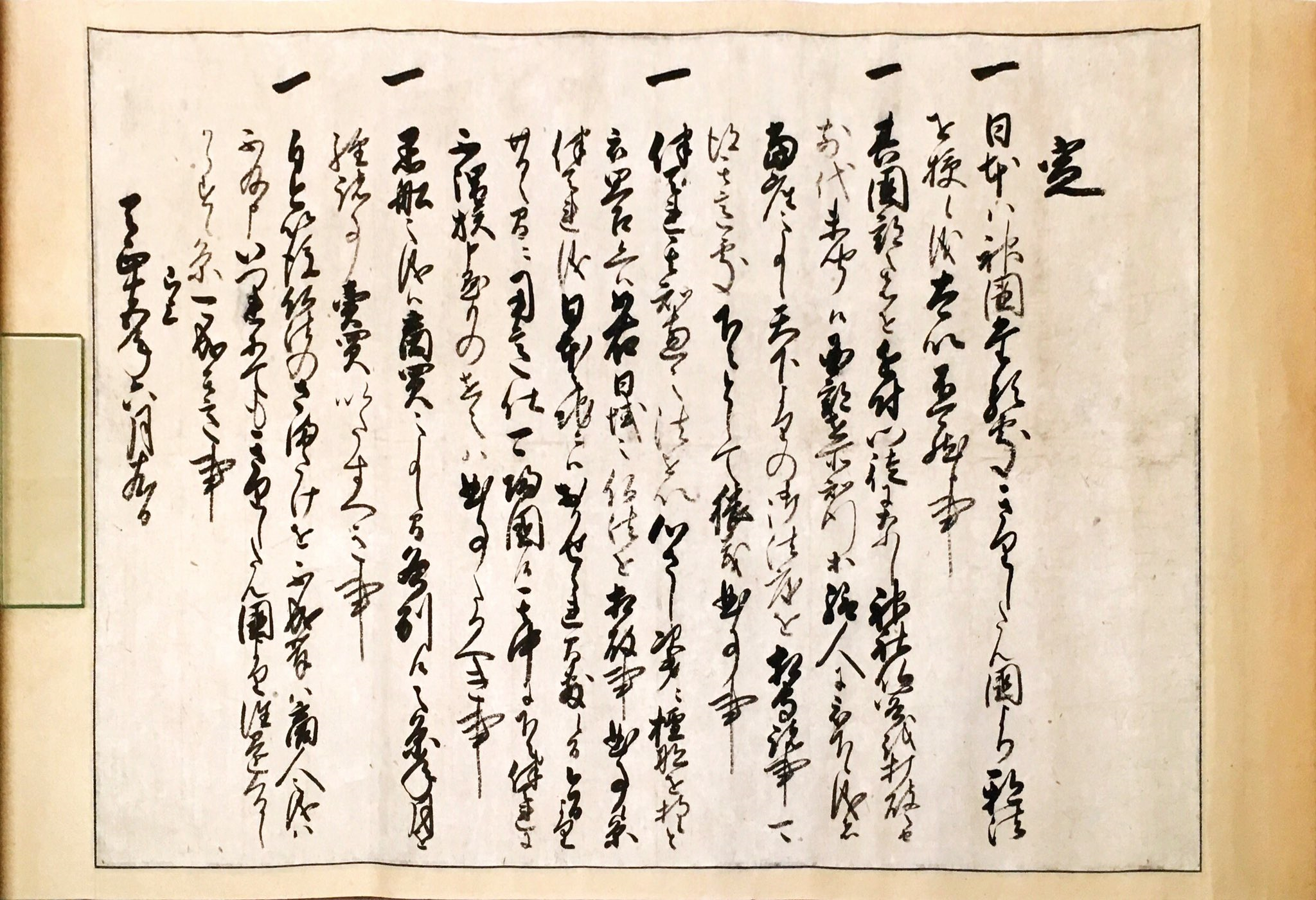
Hideyoshi's Bateren-tsuiho-rei (the Purge Directive Order to the Jesuits) on July 24, 1587

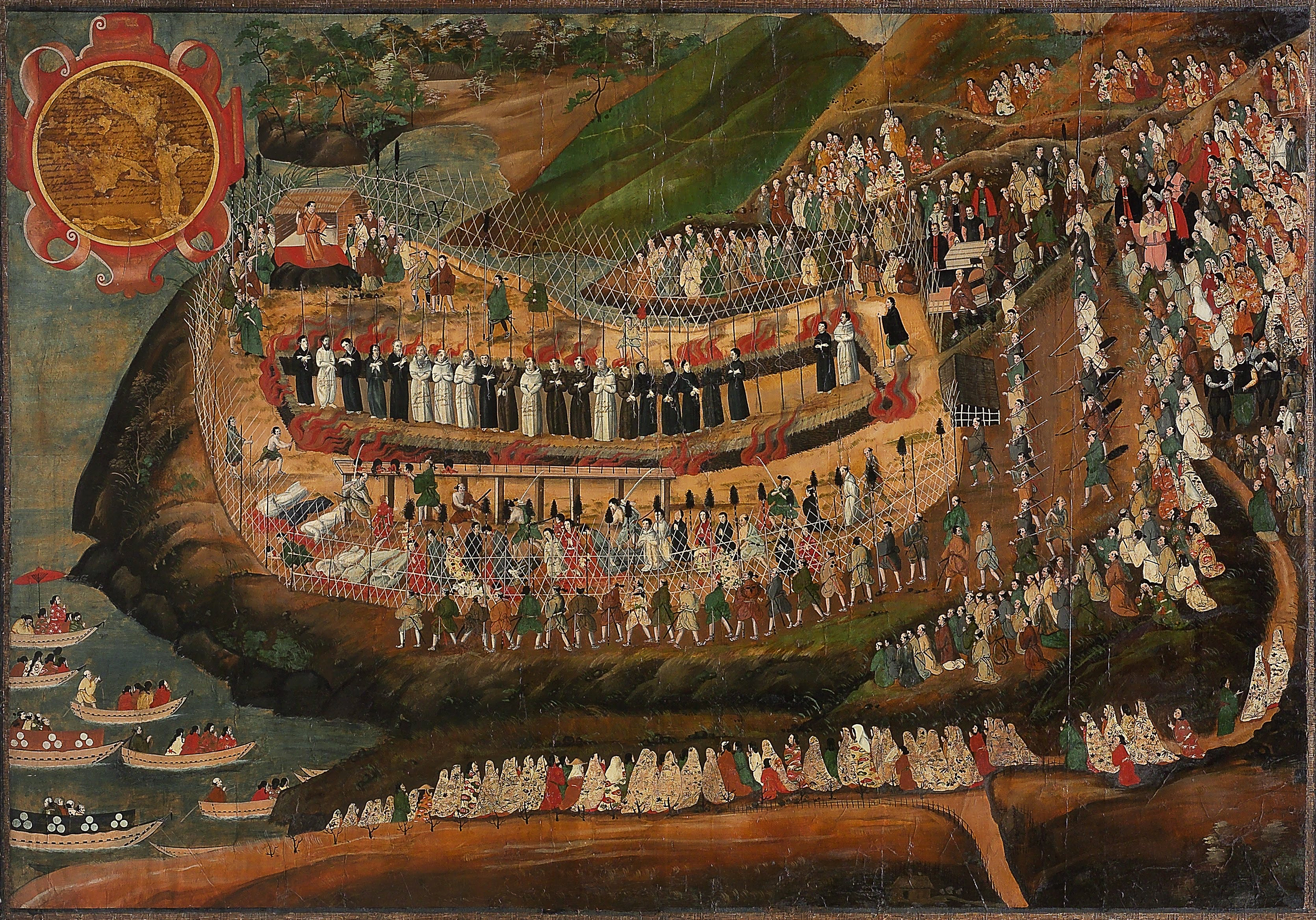
The Christian martyrs of Nagasaki. 16th–17th century Japanese painting.

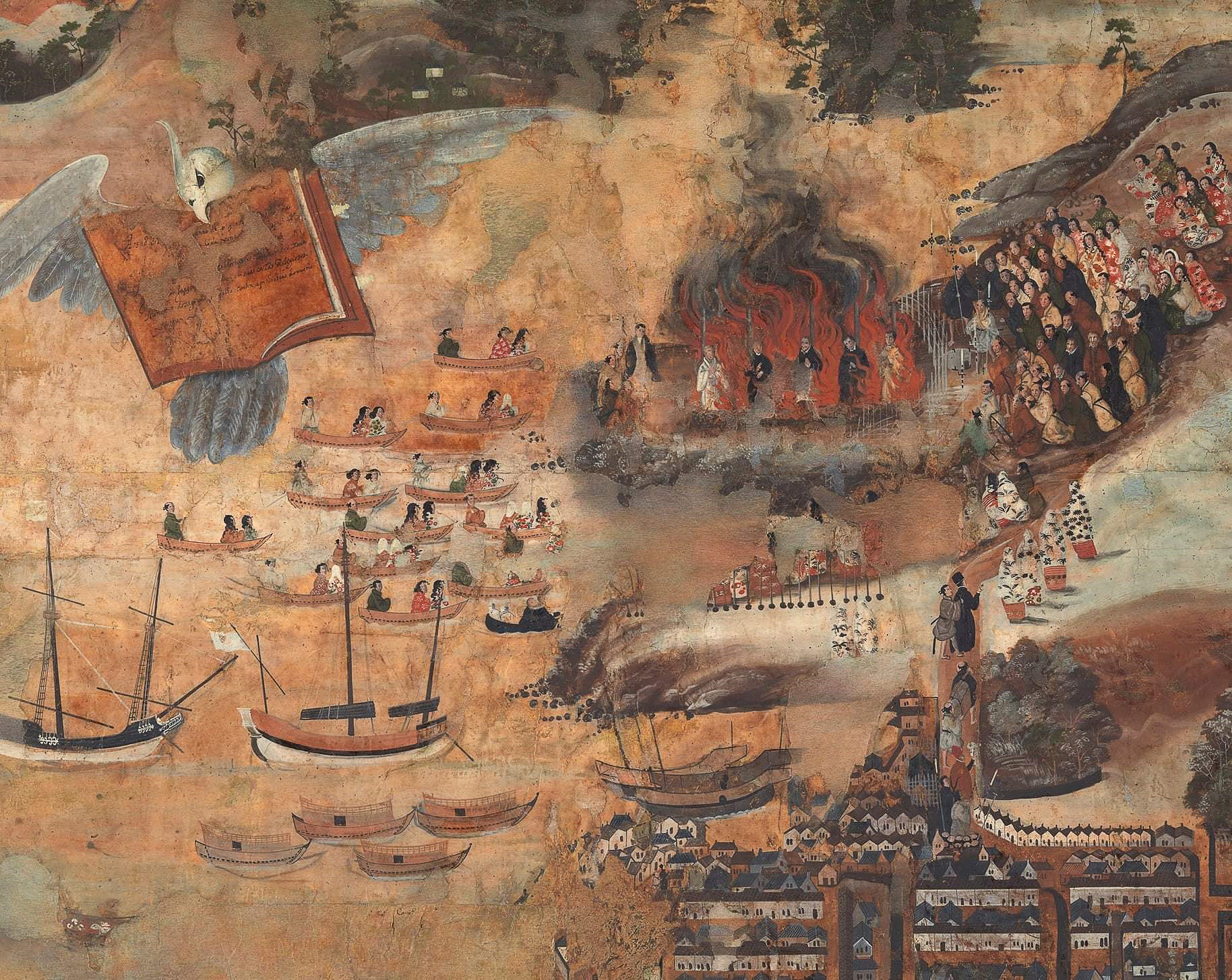
The martyrdom of Leonardo Kimura in Nagasaki, 1619

By 1587, Toyotomi Hideyoshi had become alarmed, not because of too many converts but rather because the hegemon heard that the Jesuits reportedly oversaw forced conversions of retainers and commoners, that they had garrisoned the city of Nagasaki, that they participated in the slave trade of other Japanese and, apparently offending Hideyoshi's Buddhist sentiments, that they allowed the slaughter of horses and oxen for food. He was concerned that divided loyalties might lead to dangerous rebels like the Ikkō-ikki sect of earlier years and produced his edict expelling missionaries. However, this decree was not particularly enforced.

Toyotomi Hideyoshi promulgated a ban on Christianity in form of the "Bateren edict" (the Purge Directive Order to the Jesuits) on 24 July 1587. Hideyoshi put Nagasaki under his direct rule to control Portuguese trade.

When Toyotomi Hideyoshi issued the Bateren edict, the Jesuits in Japan, led by Coelho, planned armed resistance. At first, they sought help from Kirishitan daimyōs but the daimyōs refused. Then they called for a deployment of reinforcements from their homeland and its colonies. But this plan was vetoed by Valignano. Like the Kirishitan daimyōs, he realized that a military campaign against Japan's powerful ruler would bring catastrophe to Catholicism in Japan. Valignano survived the crisis by laying all the blame on Coelho. In 1590, the Jesuits decided to stop intervening in the struggles between the daimyōs and to disarm themselves, however, they continued to send secret shipments of food and financial aid to Kirishitan daimyōs.

On 5 February 1597, twenty-six Christians – six Franciscan missionaries, three Japanese Jesuits and seventeen Japanese laymen including three young boys – were executed by crucifixion in Nagasaki. These individuals were raised on crosses and then pierced through with spears. The Martyrs of Japan were canonized on 8 June 1862 by Pope Pius IX, and are listed on the calendar as Sts. Paul Miki and his Companions, commemorated on February 6, February 5, the date of their death, being the feast of Saint Agatha.

Persecution continued sporadically, breaking out again in 1613 and 1630. On 10 September 1622, 55 Christians were martyred in Nagasaki in what became known as the Great Genna Martyrdom. On 4 December 1623, 50 were executed during the Great Martyrdom of Edo. At this time, Catholicism was officially outlawed. The Church, without a clergy, went underground until the arrival of Western missionaries in the 19th century.

== Tokugawa Ieyasu ==
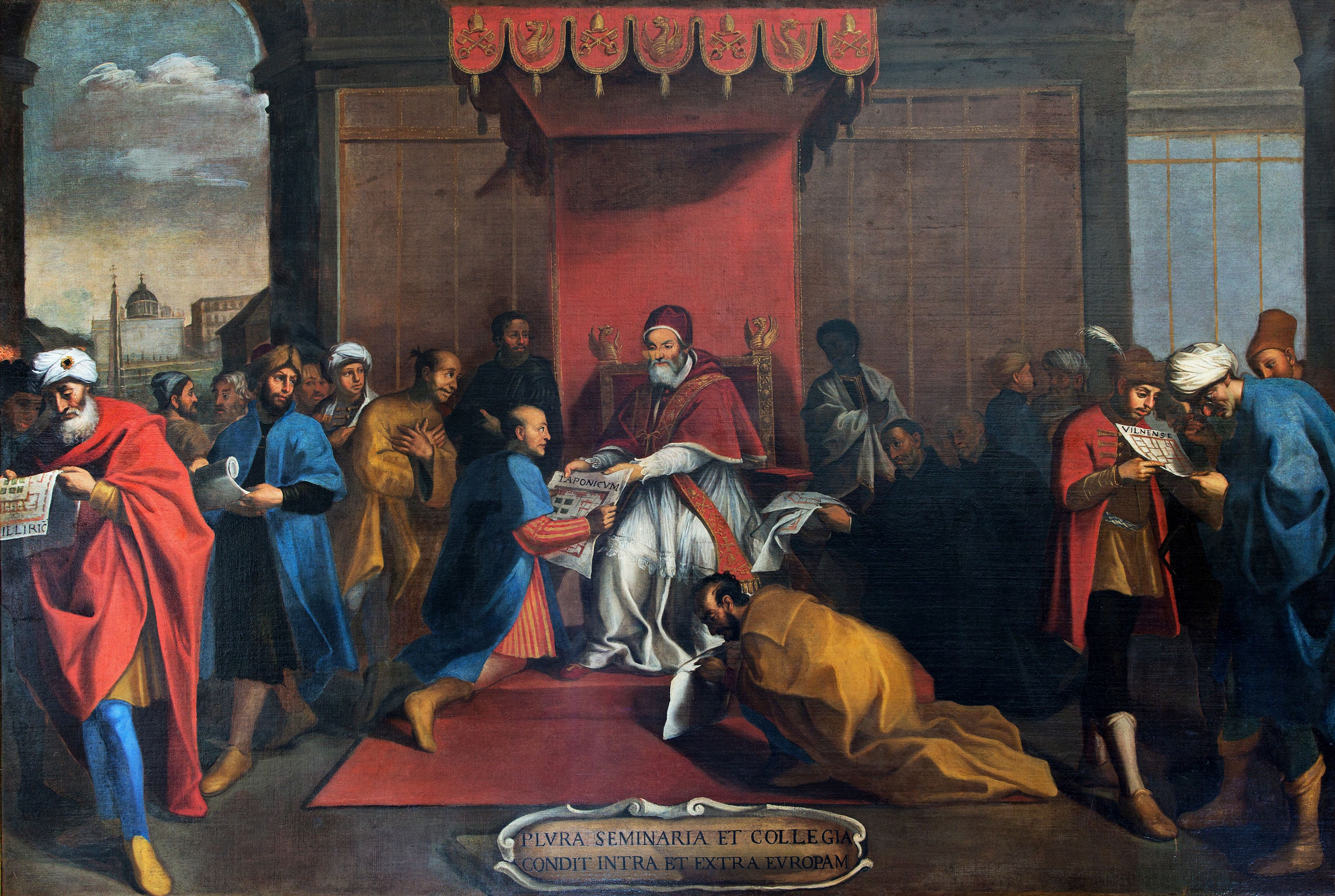
The Japanese embassy of Itō Mancio, with Pope Gregory XIII in 1585

After Toyotomi Hideyoshi's death, Tokugawa Ieyasu assumed power over Japan, in 1600. Establishes the Tokugawa shogunate.

When English sailor William Adams and his Dutch colleague Jan Joosten arrived at Japan, they told Ieyasu about the world situation, including that there were many conflicts in Europe, and that the Jesuits and other Catholics (e.g. Portuguese, Spanish), who had been proselytizing Christianity in Japan, and the Protestants (e.g. Dutch, English) were on a war against the Catholics. Ieyasu reportedly took a liking to them for their frankness and regarded them as trustworthy.

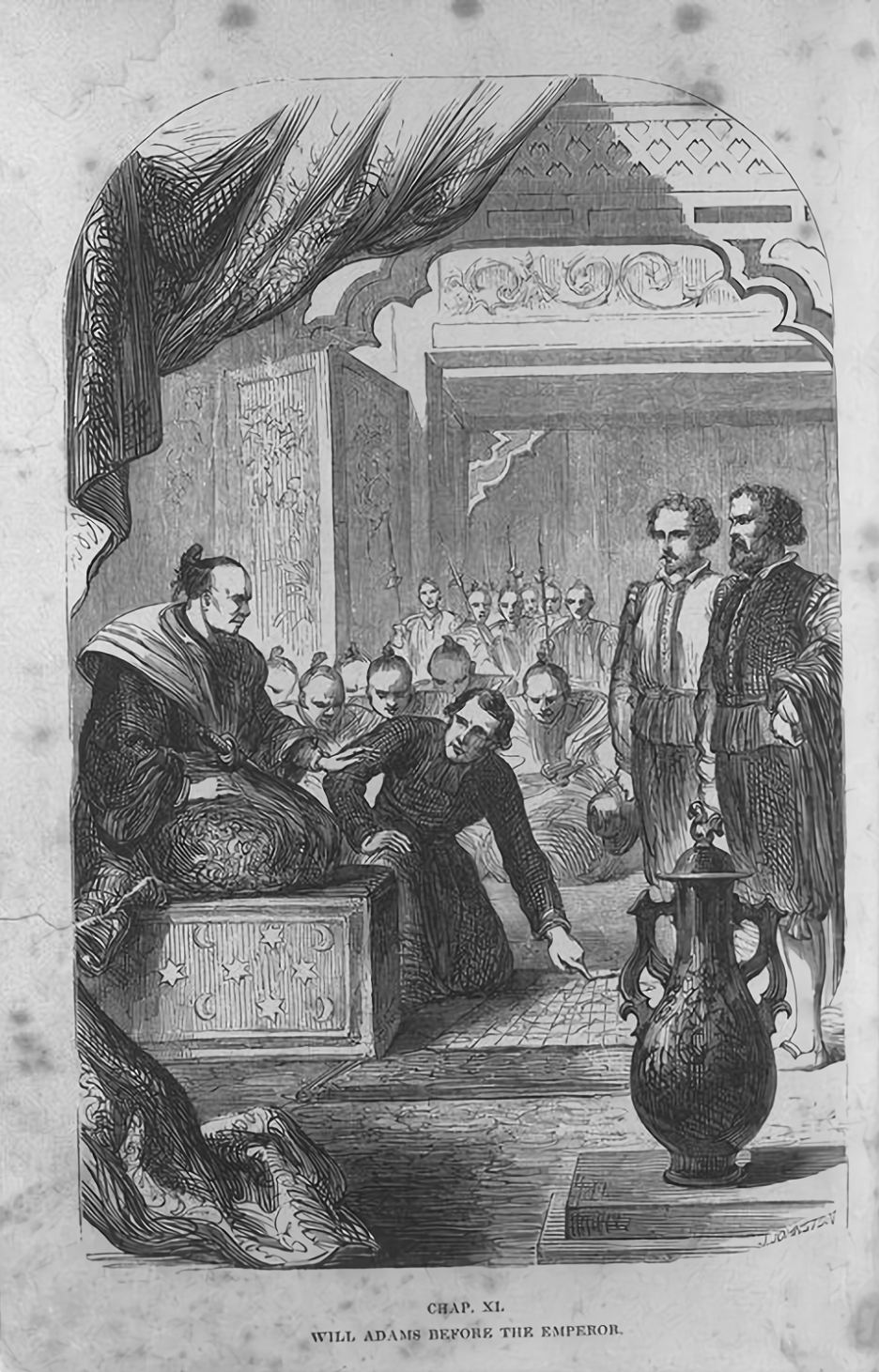
William Adams, an English Protestant sailor who became Ieyasu advisor and managed to convince the shogun to became hostile towards the Portuguese and Spanish Catholics

The Tokugawa shogunate finally decided to ban Catholicism in 1614, and in the mid-17th century demanded the expulsion of all European missionaries and the execution of all converts. This marked the end of open Christianity in Japan. The immediate cause of the prohibition was the Okamoto Daihachi incident, a case of fraud involving Ieyasu's Catholic vavasor. It is said that Ieyasu was particularly infuriated as he found out the Catholics offering prayer for Arima Harunobu, the Catholic daimyo who was executed by the Shogunate, Ieyasu later referenced this incident along with other executions of Christian criminals in 1614:

If they see a condemned fellow, they run to him with joy, bow to him, and do him reverence. This they say is the essence of their belief. If this is not an evil law, what is it? They truly are the enemies of the Gods and of Buddha.

Another reasons was the shogunate was concerned about a possible invasion by the Iberian colonial powers, which had previously occurred in the New World and the Philippines. In 1615, a Franciscan emissary of the Viceroy of New Spain asked the shōgun for land to build a Spanish fortress and this deepened Japan's suspicion against Catholicism and the Iberian colonial powers behind it. This apparently were also influenced by the role of William Adams, the English advisor of Ieyasu, as In 1614, Diogo de Carvalho complained about the threat posed by Adams and other Protestant merchants in his annual report to Pope Paul V, stating that William Adams and his companions had influenced Ieyasu to be hostile to Catholics. Ieyasu, influenced by Adams' anti-Catholic counsels and the increase in samurai and daimyos converting to Catholicism (as in the Okamoto Daihachi incident, for example), banished all Portuguese Jesuits from Japan in 1614.

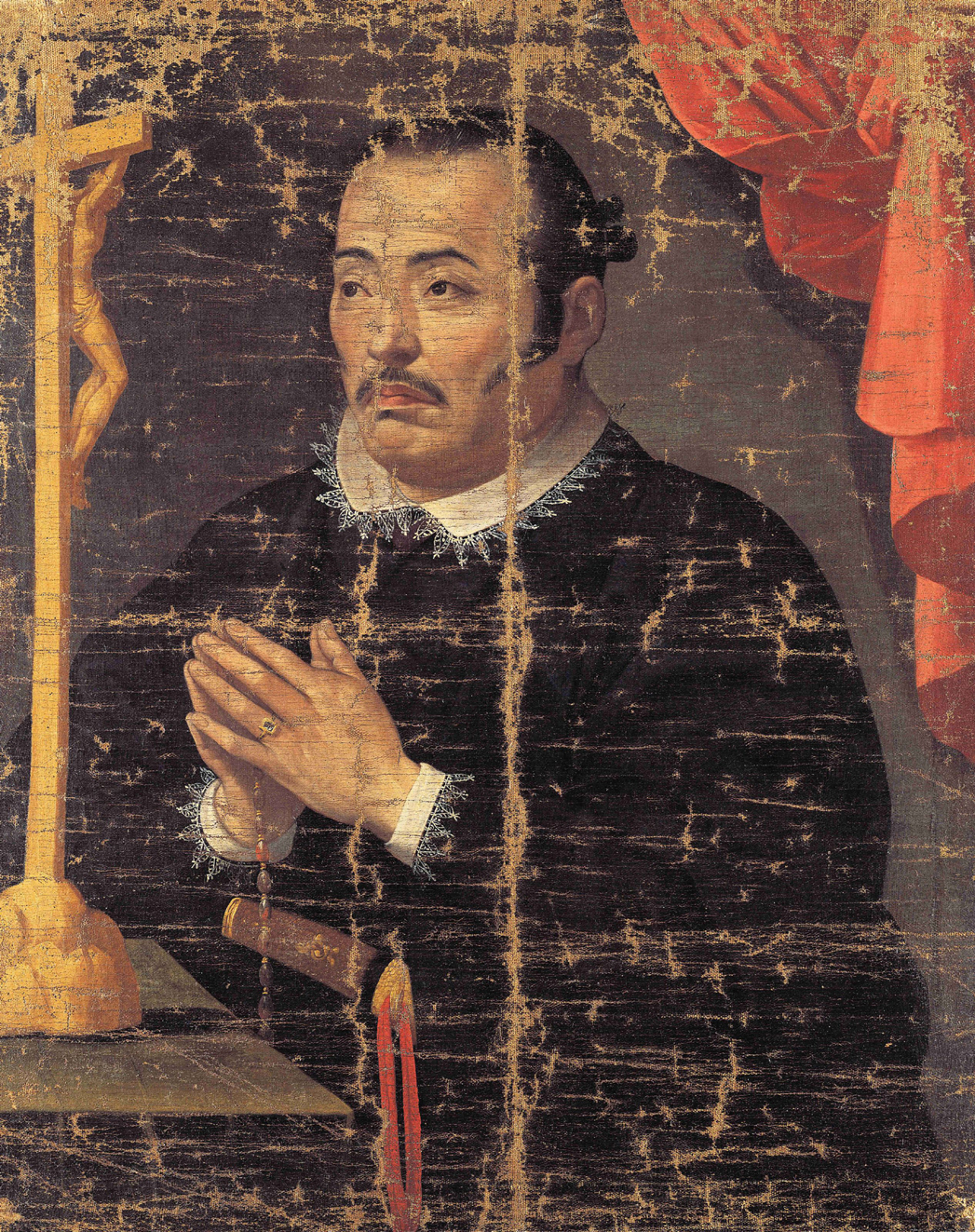
Samurai Hasekura Tsunenaga converted to Catholicism in Madrid in 1615.

Domestically, the ban was closely related to measures against the Toyotomi clan. The statement on the "Expulsion of all missionaries from Japan", drafted by Zen monk Konchiin Suden (1563–1633) and issued in 1614 under the name of second Tokugawa shōgun Hidetada (ruled 1605–1623), was considered the first official statement of a comprehensive control of Kirishitan. It claimed that the Christians were bringing disorder to Japanese society and that their followers "contravene governmental regulations, traduce Shinto, calumniate the True Law, destroy regulations, and corrupt goodness". It was fully implemented and canonized as one of the fundamental Tokugawan laws.

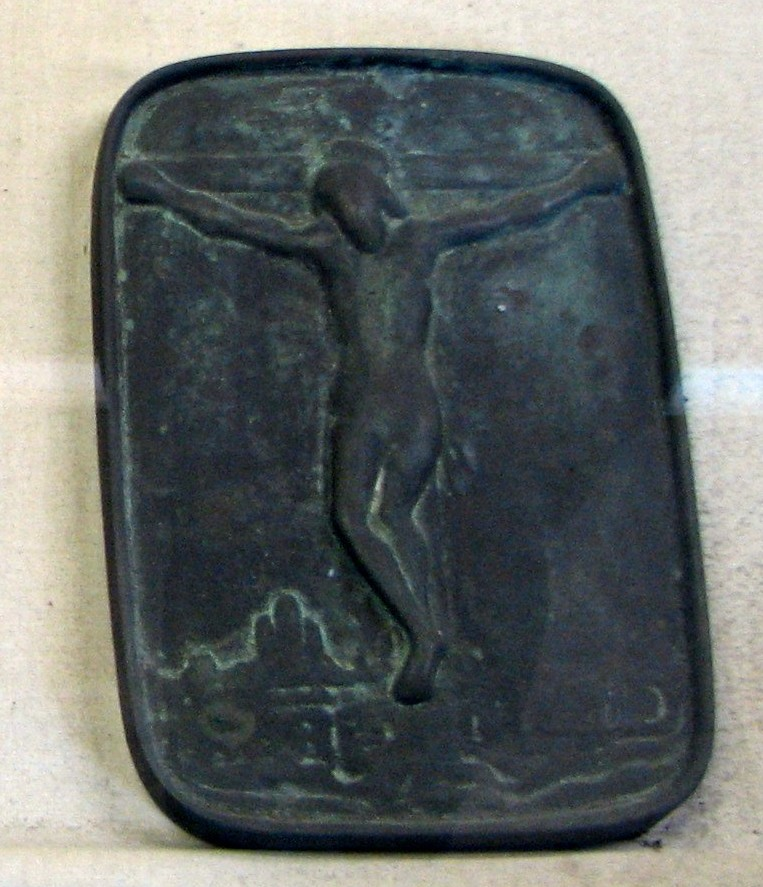
Image of Christ used to reveal practicing Catholics and sympathizers

The number of active Christians is estimated to have been around 200,000 in 1582. Christians attach a great theological importance to martyrdom, and in Japan, there were around 1,000 known martyrs during the missionary period. Countless others were dispossessed of their land and property, leading to their subsequent death in poverty.

The Japanese government used Fumi-e, pictures of the Virgin Mary and Christ meant to be trod upon, to reveal practicing Catholics and sympathizers. Anyone reluctant to step on the pictures was identified as Catholic and sent to Nagasaki. The policy of the Japanese government (Edo) was to turn Christians from their faith; if the Catholics refused to renounce their religion, they were tortured. Those who would not recant were typically executed on Nagasaki's Mount Unzen. The prosecution lasted for over two centuries.

The Shimabara Rebellion, led by a young Christian boy named Amakusa Shirō Tokisada, took place in 1637. The Rebellion was sparked by economic desperation and government oppression, but later assumed a religious tone. About 27,000 people joined the uprising, but it was crushed by the shogunate after a sustained campaign. They are not considered martyrs by the Catholic Church since they took up arms for materialistic reasons. Many Japanese were deported to Macau or to the Spanish Philippines. Many Macanese and Japanese Mestizos are the mixed-race descendants of the deported Japanese Catholics. Four hundred people were officially deported by the government to Macau and Manila, but thousands of Japanese were pressured into moving voluntarily. About 10,000 Macanese and 3,000 Japanese were moved to Manila.

== Kakure Kirishitan ==
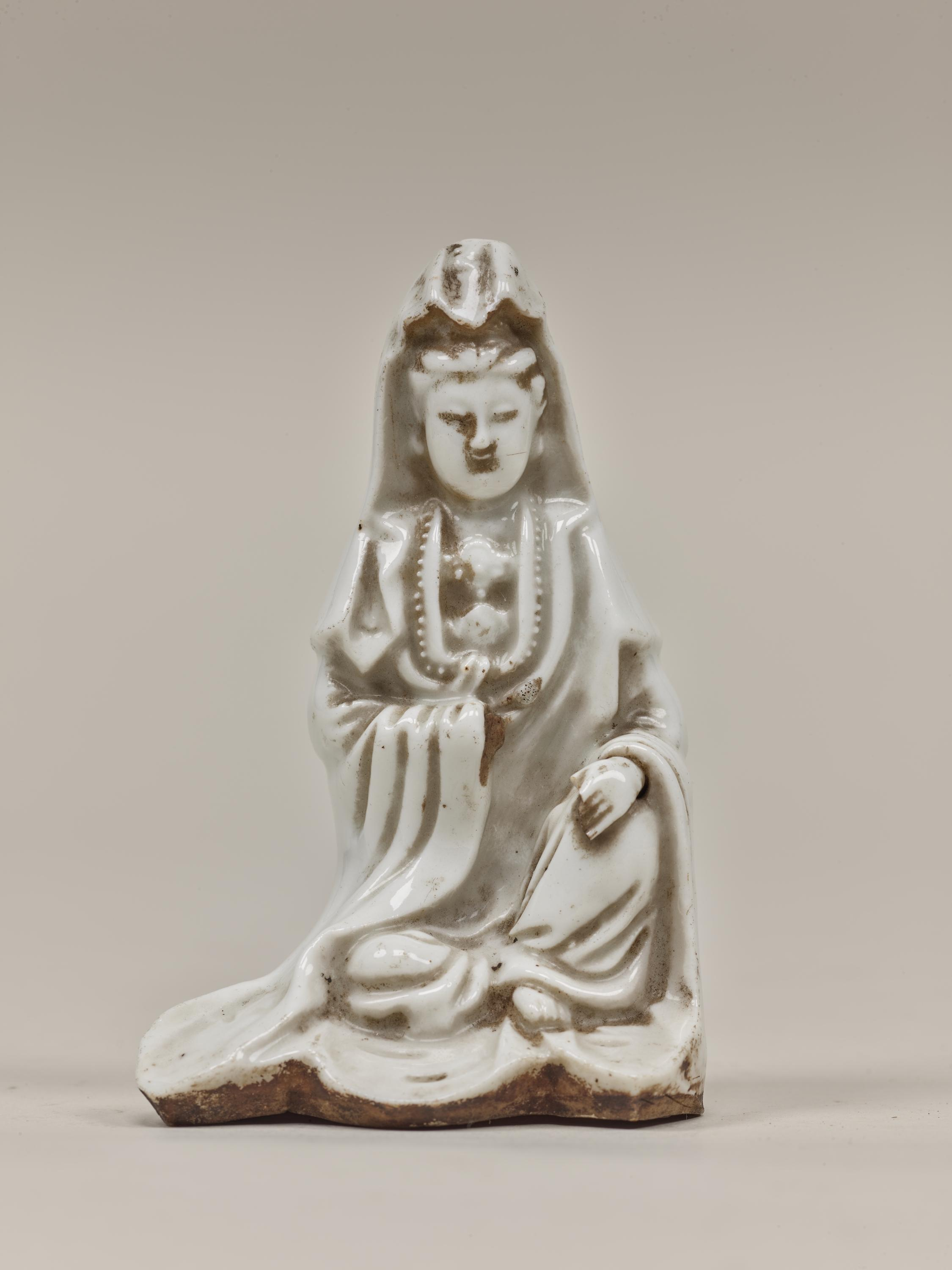
The Bodhisattva Kannon as the Virgin Mary, Tokyo National Museum

The Catholic remnant in Japan were driven underground and its members became known as the "Hidden Christians". Some priests remained in Japan illegally, including eighteen Jesuits, seven Franciscans, seven Dominicans, one Augustinian, five seculars, and an unknown number of Jesuit irmao and dojuku. During the Edo period, the Kakure Kirishitans kept their faith. Biblical phrases or prayers were transferred orally from parent to child, and secret posts (Mizukata) were assigned in their underground community to baptize their children, all while regional governments continuously operated fumi-e to expose Christians. Drawn from the oral histories of Japanese Catholic communities, Shusaku Endo's acclaimed novel Silence provides detailed accounts of the persecution of Christian communities and the suppression of the Church.

Kakure Kirishitans are called the "hidden" Christians because they continued to practice Christianity in secret. They worshipped in secret rooms in private homes. As time went on, the figures of the saints and the Virgin Mary were transformed into figurines that looked like the traditional statues of the Buddha and bodhisattvas. The prayers were adapted to sound like Buddhist chant, yet retained many untranslated words from Latin, Portuguese and Spanish. The Bible was passed down orally, due to fears of printed works being confiscated by authorities. Because of the expulsion of the Catholic clergy in the 17th century, the Kakure Christian community relied on lay leaders to lead the services.

In some cases, the communities drifted away from Christian teachings. They lost the meaning of the prayers and their religion became a version of the cult of ancestors, in which the ancestors happened to be their Christian martyrs.

Many secret Christians, some of whom had adopted these new ways of practicing Christianity, came out of hiding when religious freedom was re-established in the mid-19th century and rejoined the Roman Catholic Church after renouncing their unorthodox, syncretic practices. However, there were those who decided not to rejoin. They are known as the Hanare Kirishitan (離れキリシタン, separated Christians).

=== Modern extinction of Hanare Kirishitans ===
Following the legalization of Christianity and secularization of Japan, many Hanare Kirishitan lineages ended abruptly. Traditionally, boys learned the rituals and prayers from their fathers; when boys were uninterested or moved away from the homes, there would be no one left to continue the lineage.

For a while, Hanare Kirishitans were thought to have died out entirely, due to their tradition of secrecy. A group on Ikitsuki Island in Nagasaki prefecture, which had been overlooked by the Japanese government during the time of persecution, made their practices public in the 1980s and now perform them for audiences; however, these practices have acquired some attributes of theater, such as the telling of folktales and the use of statues and other images which most underground Christians had never created.

The anthropologist Christal Whelan uncovered the existence of genuine Hanare Kirishitans on the Gotō Islands where Kakure Kirishitans had once fled. There were only two surviving priests on the islands, both of whom were over 90, and they would not talk to each other. The few surviving laity had also all reached old age, and some of them no longer had any priests from their lineage and prayed alone. Although these Hanare Kirishitans had a strong tradition of secrecy, they agreed to be filmed for her documentary Otaiya.

== Rediscovery and return ==
Japan was opened to foreign interaction by Matthew Perry in 1853. It became possible for foreigners to live in Japan with the Harris Treaty in 1858. Many Christian clergymen were sent from Catholic, Protestant and Orthodox Churches, though proselytizing was still banned. In 1865, some of the Japanese who lived in Urakami village near Nagasaki visited the new Ōura Church which had been built by the Paris Foreign Missions Society (Société des Missions Etrangères de Paris) barely a month before. A female member of the group spoke to a French priest, Bernard Thaddée Petitjean, and revealed that their families had kept the Kirishitan faith. Those Kirishitan wanted to see the statue of the Virgin Mary with their own eyes, and to confirm that the priest was single and truly came from the Pope in Rome. After this interview, many Kirishitan thronged toward Petitjean. He investigated their underground organizations and discovered that they had kept the rite of baptism and the liturgical years without European priests for nearly 250 years. Petitjean's report surprised the Christian world; Pope Pius IX called it a miracle.

The Edo shogunate's edicts banning Christianity were still on the books, however, and thus the religion continued to be persecuted up to 1867, the last year of its rule. Robert Bruce Van Valkenburgh, the American minister-resident in Japan, privately complained of this persecution to the Nagasaki magistrates, though little action was taken to stop it. The succeeding Meiji government initially continued in this vein and several thousand people were exiled (Urakami Yoban Kuzure). After Europe and the U.S. began to vocally criticize the persecution, the Japanese government realized that it needed to lift the ban in order to attain its interests. In 1873 the ban was lifted. Numerous exiles returned and began construction of the Urakami Cathedral, which was completed in 1895. The Urakami Cathedral was nearby the epicenter of the atomic bombing of Nagasaki; killing about 2/3rds of the Catholic population of Nagasaki.

It was later revealed that tens of thousands of Kirishitan still survived in some regions near Nagasaki. Some officially returned to the Catholic Church, while others remained apart from the Catholic Church and have stayed as Hanare Kirishitan, retaining their own traditional beliefs and their descendants asserting that they keep their ancestors' religion. However, it became difficult for them to keep their community and rituals, so they eventually converted to Buddhism or Shinto. When Pope John Paul II visited Nagasaki in 1981, he baptized some young people from Kakure Kirishitan families – a rare occurrence.

== Enduring legacy of anti-Catholic propaganda ==
In modern Japan, Christianity faces a legacy of hostility rooted in ethnocentric and anti-Christian cultural biases. Historical campaigns, particularly those targeting Catholicism and the Jesuit order, were driven by political, ideological, religious, and social interests. Jesuits were often portrayed as malicious agents and accused of exaggerated or implausible acts. Such claims reflect a broader, fanatical effort to vilify Christian missionaries as foreign outsiders, using ethnocentric sentiment to undermine Christianity's presence in Japan.

This anti-Christian narrative persists in some academic discourse, where biased interpretations continue to distort historical understanding. Certain scholars employ methodologically flawed practices, such as relying on Meiji-era sources, produced nearly three centuries after the Sengoku period, as if they were primary sources. As the majority of missionary letters remain untranslated, many Japanese historians rely on limited translations of Portuguese documents, which are far from being eyewitness accounts or primary sources. (Note: Among Japanese historians, proficiency in reading Portuguese documents, as demonstrated by scholars such as Yoshitomo Okamoto and Kiichi Matsuda, remains exceedingly rare. Even these individuals, whose academic training is primarily in linguistics, often lack specialized expertise in critical fields such as Japanese history, Jesuit theology, or Portuguese legal history. This limitation hinders their ability to fully contextualize and interpret such sources within the broader historical and cultural framework.) These historians often rush to conclusions without adequately studying the theology, culture, or common assumptions of the missionaries at the time, resulting in insufficient contextualization. This approach, despite the availability of contradictory contemporary evidence or the scarcity of original records, perpetuates historical inaccuracies. Such practices hinder a nuanced understanding of Christianity's role in Japan's past, reinforcing a legacy of mistrust rooted in early propaganda.

=== Depictions of Christianity from sakoku to the 19th century ===
In Conquering Demons (2013), historian Leuchtenberger explores the evolving portrayal of Kirishitan (Japanese Christians) within the context of Japan's national identity during the sakoku (isolation) period through the 19th century. By analyzing texts such as Bateren-ki (Records of the Padres), Kirishitan Monogatari (Tales of the Christians), and Kirishitan Shumon Raicho Jikki (True Record of the Arrival of the Christian Sect), Leuchtenberger reveals how, following the expulsion of Christians from Japan in the early 17th century, a fabricated pseudo-history emerged. This narrative falsely depicted Kirishitan as orchestrating a conquest of Japan, serving to vilify them and justify their eradication.

Leuchtenberger posits that Kirishitan became a constructed concept symbolizing Japan's first significant encounter with the West, encapsulating persistent anxieties about Western influence and Japan's position in the global order. They were stereotyped as grotesque and sinister deceivers whose primary aim was to invade and exploit foreign nations for personal gain, a portrayal that dehumanized them and reinforced their exclusion from Japanese society.

The Kirishitan Shumon Raicho Jikki emphasizes Japan's identity as a divine nation (shinkoku), narrating stories of repelling barbaric invaders to underscore Japan's military, cultural, and religious superiority. These widely circulated texts fostered a national identity rooted in the belief that Japan was uniquely resilient and morally superior to foreign powers, shaping a collective self-image of exceptionalism.

From the 18th to 19th centuries, depictions of Kirishitan evolved into exaggerated, villain-like figures reminiscent of medieval folktales. Cast as barbaric yet familiar, they served as foils to portray Japan as sacred and civilized. This imagery reflected insecurities about Japan's global standing and reinforced a discourse of cultural and religious exceptionalism, framing Kirishitan as a threatening but defeated enemy and strengthening Japan's self-image as a divinely protected, superior civilization.

=== Novels and literature ===
Literary scholar Rebecca Suter, in Holy Ghosts: The Christian Century in Modern Japanese Fiction (2015), examines modern Japanese perspectives on Kirishitan (Japanese Christians). Suter notes that Kirishitan are often used to express two dominant emotions in Japanese discourse: fear and hatred of foreigners. From the 1960s to the mid-1990s, Kirishitan in novels shifted from cultural curiosities to symbols of danger and evil, consistently portrayed as negative figures subjected to relentless demonization. Suter connects this to Nihonjinron (theories of Japanese identity), which emphasize Japan's exceptionalism, cultural homogeneity, and fundamental difference from other ethnic groups, unchanged since antiquity. In this framework, Japan is depicted as superior to the West, with Kirishitan and Christianity serving as stereotypes to reinforce this narrative.

=== Manga and light novels ===
In popular culture like manga, Kirishitan are employed to bolster conservative ideologies and Japanese identity, symbolizing an external threat that delineates boundaries between "inside" and "outside" Japan. Post-bubble economy, Kirishitan and Christians in manga evoke fear of foreigners to reinforce national unity and identity. Conservative rhetoric continues to exploit their historical role as symbolic enemies, a pattern increasingly amplified in popular media. Despite Christianity being a marginal minority in modern Japan, Kirishitan are stereotyped as formidable outsiders, serving as a narrative trope defeated by protagonists to affirm Japanese superiority. Their significance as embodiments of moral panic in Japanese pop culture and politics remains as potent in the 21st century as in the 17th century.

== See also ==
- List of Westerners who visited Japan before 1868
- Nippo Jisho
- Suwa Shrine (Nagasaki)
