= Juan Fernández (missionary) =

Spanish Jesuit missionary (c. 1526-1567)

Juan Fernández (1526? at Cordova – 12 June 1567 in Japan) was a Spanish Jesuit lay brother and missionary. He was the first European to write a grammar and lexicon of the Japanese language.

== Early life ==
Fernández was born Juan Fernandez de Oviedo in the Spanish city of Cordoba in 1526.

Before his entry into the Society of Jesus (Jesuits), young Fernández was a Spanish hidalgo and went by the gentry appellation of Juan of Cordoba. The Francis Xavier biographer, George Schurhammer, S.J. wrote of Fernandez that he was "a sophisticated young man who lacked a formal education, but had fine mind". He lived in Lisbon, then one of Europe's most flourishing cities, where his brother was a rich merchant who owned a business that sold expensive silks and velvets on the fashionable Rue Novo do Mercadores. By all accounts, Fernández lived a comfortable life as was expected since as a caballero hidalgo, it was necessary for him to abstain from occupations that were considered less than noble. The nature of the Spanish social structure was such that the gentry were expected to live life nobly, if they had the means to do so. Because of the family's wealth, young Juan of Cordoba was able to do just that. However, in his early twenties, these social distinctions were about to become meaningless and his life was to turn in another direction.

== Conversion ==
A fateful event changed his life forever when a friend invited him to visit a church to "hear some excellent music". Instead, Fernández listened to a fiery sermon by the Jesuit priest, Francisco Estrada, on the Passion of Christ. Schurhammer describes the scene as being attended by some two hundred of the city’s most prominent men, and, "[w]hen it was ended, the lights were extinguished and the men in the church began to scourge themselves". The ceremony so affected Fernández, that soon thereafter he aspired to religious life and before too long he asked to be admitted to the Society of Jesus, only not as a priest, but as a temporal coadjutor or a lay brother in 1547.

In a letter of 20 January 1548, written from Cochin to Simon Rodrigues, Francis Xavier asked that more priests be sent to India and at the same time, described the physical and personal attributes necessary for missionary life in the Far East, writing, "I also earnestly beseech you for the love and service of God our Lord that when you arrange for the sending of some of the Society who are not preachers to these regions of India to convert the infidels, they be persons who have been well tried in the Society and have had many experiences in gaining victories over themselves during the course of some years, and that they not be of poor health, since the labors in India require physical strength, even though spiritual strength is more important."

Simon Rodrigues must have concluded that the young brother was well suited for missionary work because, on 3 September 1548, Brother Fernández arrived in Goa (the capital of the Portuguese India) from Portugal. He had travelled aboard the São Pedro in the company of several of his Jesuit brethren.

== Missionary work in Japan ==
In 1549, Fernández would accompany Francis Xavier and Father Cosme de Torres (1506–1576) on the first Christian mission to Japan. By its very nature this was the first substantial cultural exchange between Europe and Japan.

The early Jesuit missionaries arrived in Japan on 15 August 1549, on the Feast of the Assumption, and spent their first year in Kagoshima, a port city on the southern tip of the island nation. There the first Japanese Christian community was formed and the Jesuits focused on learning the Japanese language and creating crude Christian books written in Japanese characters that explained basic tenets of Christian doctrine. The Jesuits moved on from Kagoshima and Xavier planned to convert to Christianity the emperor of Japan, which they hoped would result in a Constantine-style conversion of the entire island nation. Xavier believed also that since the Japanese held reason in high esteem, the Japanese would reason for themselves that becoming Christians would be the correct thing to do. Xavier anticipated that Japan would be the easiest Asian nation to convert. Jesuit missionaries later in the sixteenth century had high hopes that the complete conversion of Japan would counterbalance the defection of England from the comity of Catholic nations. However, the mission to the emperor was unsuccessful since he spoke to no one except the most prominent members of Japanese society and instead the Jesuits turned their focus on the individual Christian conversion of the daimyōs, or Japanese warlords.

In a letter from Portuguese Malacca, dated 20 June 1549, Francis Xavier begs the prayers of the Goa brethren for those about to start on the Japanese mission, mentioning among them Juan Fernández. On their arrival in Japan Juan was active in the work of evangelizing.

In September 1550, he accompanied Francis Xavier to Hirado, then to Yamaguchi. They returned to Yamaguchi, where he was left with Father Cosme de Torres in charge of the Christians when Francis Xavier started for China.

There was in the records of the Jesuit college at Coimbra a lengthy document, professed to be the translation of an account rendered to Francis Xavier by Fernández of a controversy with the Japanese on such questions as the nature of God, creation, the nature and immortality of the soul. The success of Brother Fernández on this occasion in refuting his Japanese adversaries resulted in the ill will of Buddhist priests, who stirred up a rebellion against the local daimyō, who had become a Christian. The missionaries were concealed by the wife of one of the nobles until they were able to resume their work of preaching.

Francis Xavier says in one of his letters:

"Joann Fernández though a simple layman, is most useful on account of the fluency of his acquaintance with the Japanese language and of the aptness and clearness with which he translates whatever Father Cosmo suggests to him."

His humility under pressure impressed all and on one occasion resulted in the conversion of a young Japanese doctor, who later became a Jesuit.

== Death and legacy ==
In 1567, Brother Fernández died in Hirado, eighteen years after his arrival in Japan at the age of forty-one. Father Cosme de Torres who died in Shiki on the island of Amakusa on 2 October 1570, whom the Xavier biographer, Theodore Maynard, credits with saying of his fellow missionary: "If Japan has to thank Father Xavier for having brought her the faith, she has to thank Brother Fernández for its conservation after the departure of the saint."

== See also ==
- Chronology of European exploration of Asia
