= Cosme de Torres =

Spanish jesuit missionary

- Born: c. 1510; Valencia, Spain
- Died: October 2, 1570 (aged 60); Amakusa, Japan

Cosme de Torres (1510 – October 2, 1570) was a Spanish Jesuit from Valencia and one of the first Christian missionaries in Japan. He was born in Valencia and died in Amakusa, an island now in Kumamoto Prefecture, Japan.

== Early life (1510–1549) ==
Born in Valencia in 1510, Torres was ordained into the priesthood in 1535. In 1536 he was a teacher of grammar at Mons Rrendinus university, Mallorca. After a stay in Valencia and Ulldecona, he was sent as a missionary to Mexico. From there, he went to Asia and met Francis Xavier in the Moluccas in 1546. He entered the Society of Jesus in Goa in 1548, where he worked as a teacher of grammar at the Jesuit college.

== Beginnings of the Japanese mission (1549–1551) ==
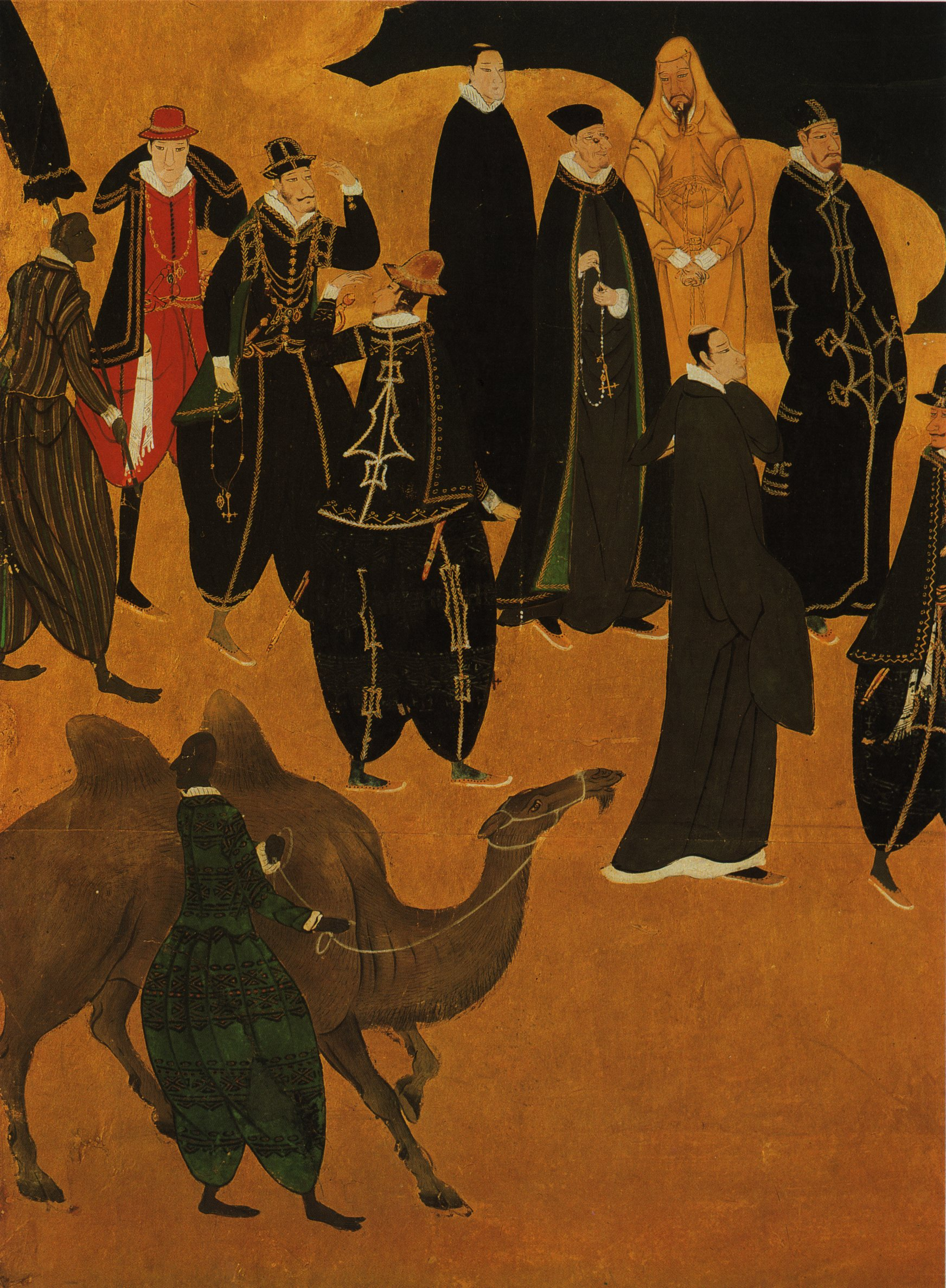
de Torres in the 16th-century six-fold byōbu (lacquer and gilded screen), by Kanō Naizen

Torres arrived in Kagoshima, a city located in Kyushu, the southernmost of the three main islands of Japan on August 15, 1549. He was accompanied by Francis Xavier, Brother Juan Fernandez, and several Indian servants, as well as by three Japanese Christians converts that had met Xavier in Malacca in 1547. The missionaries began work in Kagoshima by preaching on the streets, reading from a catechism written by Xavier that had been translated into Japanese by their companion, Anjirō.

In late 1549, Xavier decided to travel to Kyoto where he intended to request an audience with the Japanese emperor, Emperor Go-Nara. Both Torres and Fernandez went with him. En route, they stopped in Yamaguchi, where they began working to convert the population of the city. When Xavier and Fernandez left Yamaguchi in December 1550 to continue the journey to the capital, Torres was left behind to continue the missionary work begun there. In mid-1551, Xavier returned to Yamaguchi after a disappointing trip to Kyoto, where he was denied his request for an imperial audience.

In September 1551, Torres wrote of the intellectual curiosity of the citizens of Yamaguchi, saying "Those [Jesuits] who come to these regions must be very learned in order to answer the very deep and difficult questions which they [the citizens] ask from morning till night. They are very insistent in their questions. From the day on which Padre Mestre Francisco came into this city, which is now some five months or more ago, there has never been a day on which there were not priests and laymen here from morning until late at night in order to ask all kinds of questions." Torres also wrote of his success in converting the Japanese in Yamaguchi: "When they [the Japanese Christian converts] once accepted the faith, there are, from what I have seen and heard, and from what I have experienced with them, no people in the world so tenacious. It seems to me that the majority of those who have become Christians, and of those there are many, are ready to endure any calamity for the love of God." Reportedly, Torres baptized more than two thousand people and built a church in the city. Here, he worked selflessly to help townspeople whose lives were devastated by the constant warfare of the Sengoku period in Japan, even giving up his life savings to buy food for starving people regardless of whether they were Christians or Buddhists.

== Torres as mission superior (1551–1570) ==
After Xavier departed from Japan in 1551 to begin a Jesuit mission in China, Torrès succeeded him as the superior of the Japanese mission. Under his leadership, the number of Christians in Japan grew steadily, despite antagonism from Buddhist sects. During his time as mission superior, his success in converting large numbers of Japanese people aroused much animosity on the part of the Buddhist monks. Torres had several debates with learned members of the Buddhist community, which were recorded by Brother Fernandez. Torres based his arguments in these debates on reason, believing that it would be highly effective against the Japanese who were, as he said, "led by reason just as well as and even more willingly than Spaniards." He especially attacked the Buddhist belief that the foundation and origin of the world was pure nonbeing.

Torres stayed in Yamaguchi until the city was taken over by the Mori clan in 1556, which was hostile towards Christianity. At this time, Torres was forced to move to Bungo Province, where he was offered protection by the young daimyō, Ōtomo Yoshishige. The destruction of the mission in Yamaguchi by the Mori clan was especially heart-breaking for Torres, who wrote to Núñez that his life in Yamaguchi had been filled with joy and satisfaction.

In 1562, Torrès moved to Yokoseura, a port city that was recently opened to Portuguese traders by local daimyo Ōmura Sumitada. Torres directed the negotiations with Ōmura Sumitada concerning the establishment of a port in Nagasaki for the foreign trade, as the Jesuit historian Luis de Guzmán specially remarks. Ōmura donated a piece of land and a house to the Jesuit mission from his own personal property. The house was used as a Jesuit residence and Torres established a Christian cemetery, as well as a hospital on the donated land. This cemetery was particularly important for the mission, since Buddhist temples refused to bury Japanese Christian converts.

The Jesuit missionary Luís Fróis recorded many incidents that demonstrate the missionary zeal and self-sacrificing nature of Torres. Torres never failed to offer mass, even if he was so gravely ill that he was unable to stand and had to lean against the altar. He greeted all visitors warmly, with "tears of love from his eyes". According to Frois, his "modesty and religious maturity suited the nature of the Japanese so much that he won profound love and respect from them". Torres was so adored by Japanese Christian converts that many of them kept locks of his hair or pieces of his old clothing as treasures.

Torrès's primary concern was the education of the Christian community. He encouraged his congregation to become familiar with the Bible and promoted this by organizing pageants to educate the new converts. He was also especially concerned with the education of Christian children. He held daily catechism classes for forty to fifty children who were taught to recite prayers in Latin. Torres also organized Japanese classes for them, appointing a Japanese lay brother to teach them to read and write in their native language.

== See also ==
- Francis Xavier
- Sengoku period
- Exploration of Asia
- Society of Jesus

== Bibliography ==
- Pacheco, S. J., Diego (1973). El hombre que forjó a Nagasaki. Vida del P. Cosme de Torres, S. J. (in Spanish). Madrid. ISBN 9788421303603. OCLC 434081825.
- Cabezas, Antonio (1994). El siglo ibérico del Japón. La presencia Hispano-portuguesa en Japón (1543–1643) (in Spanish). Valladolid. ISBN 9788477624523.
- Fujita, Neil S. (1991). Japan's Encounter with Christianity: The Catholic Mission in Pre-Modern Japan. New York. ISBN 9780809132065.
- Lacouture, Jean (1995). Jesuits: A Multibiography. Translated by Legatt, Jeremy. Washington, D.C. ISBN 9781887178051.
- Proust, Jacques (2002). Europe through the Prism of Japan. Translated by Bell, Elizabeth. Notre Dame. ISBN 9780268027612.
- Schurhammer, Georg (1929). Die Disputationen des P. Cosme de Torres, S.J. mit den Buddhisten in Yamaguchi im Jahre 1551. Nach den Briefen des P. Torres und dem Protokoll seines Dolmetschers Br. Juan Fernández (in German). Tokyo. OCLC 185165066.
