= Nanban trade =

1543–1614 period of Japanese history

The Nanban trade (南蛮貿易, Nanban bōeki; "Southern barbarian trade") was trade between Europeans and the Japanese that took place in Japan from the arrival of Europeans in 1543 to the first Sakoku Seclusion Edicts of isolationism in 1614. (Note: Frequently referred to today in scholarship as kaikin, or "maritime restrictions", more accurately reflecting the booming trade that continued during this period and the fact that Japan was far from "closed" or "secluded.")

The Nanban trade as a form of European contact began with Portuguese explorers, missionaries, and merchants in the Sengoku period and established long-distance overseas trade routes with Japan. The resulting technological and cultural exchange included the introduction of matchlock firearms, cannons, galleon-style shipbuilding, and Christianity to Japan, among other cultural aspects. The Nanban trade declined in the early Edo period with the rise of the Tokugawa shogunate which feared the influence of Christianity in Japan, particularly the Roman Catholicism of the Portuguese. The Tokugawa issued a series of Sakoku policies that increasingly isolated mainland Japan from the outside world and limited European trade to Dutch traders on the artificial island of Dejima, under total scrutiny.

== First contacts ==
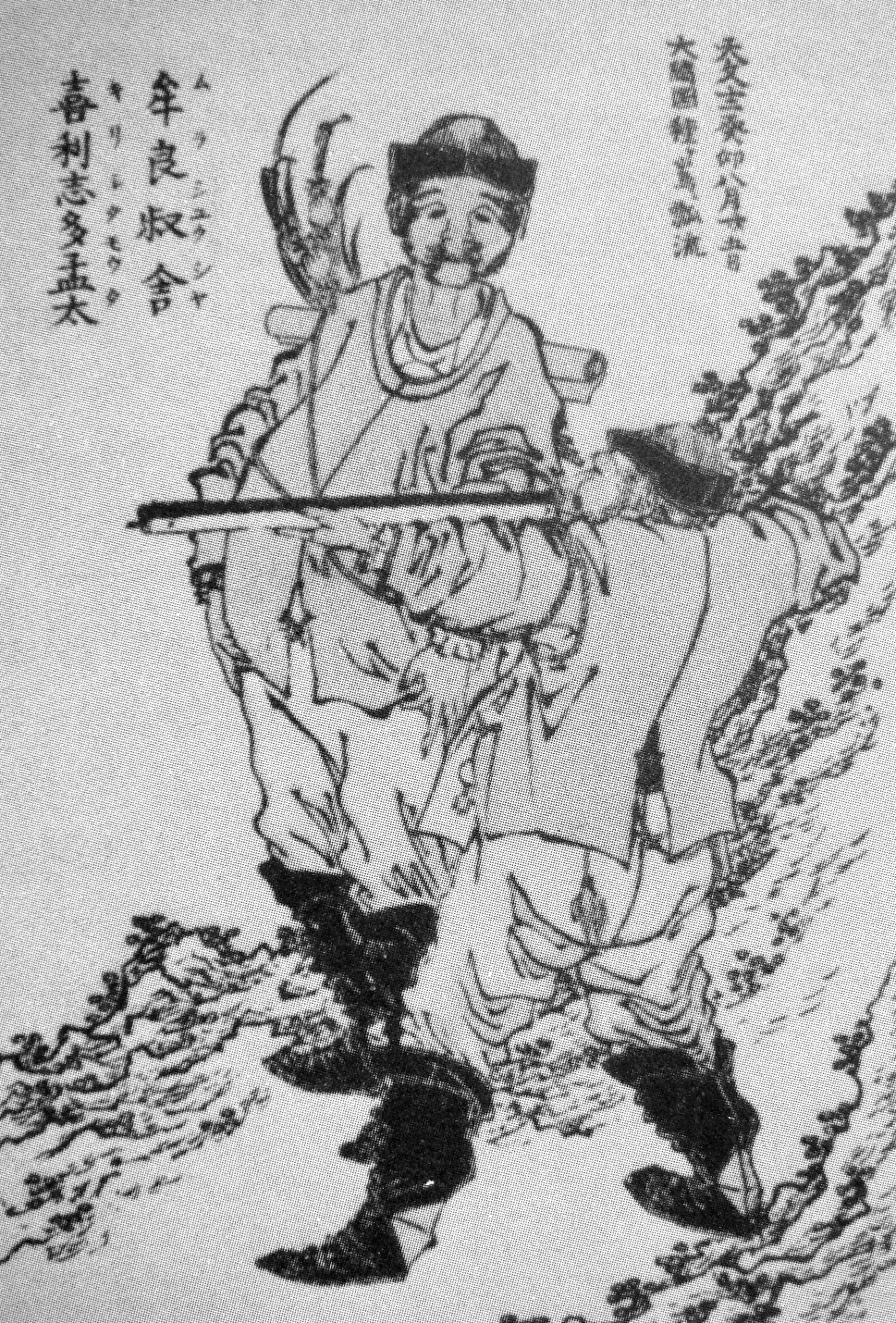
First Westerners in Japan, by Hokusai, 1817. Caption: "On August 25, 1543, these foreigners were cast upon the island of Tanegashima, Ōsumi Province", followed by the two names Murashukusha (unknown) and Kirishitamōta (i.e. António da Mota, also known as Cristóvão, the Portuguese equivalent to Cristopher).

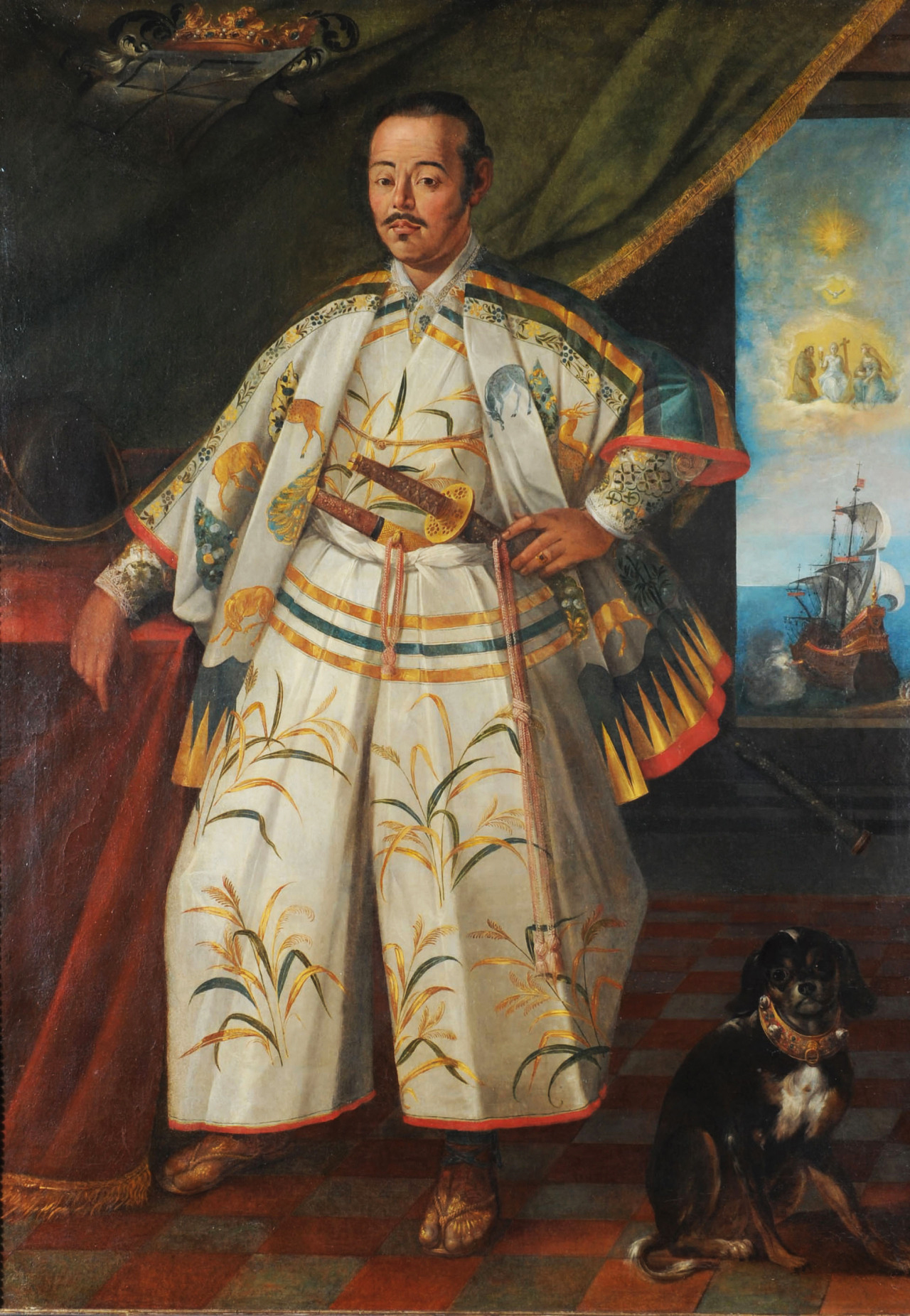
The samurai Hasekura Tsunenaga in Rome in 1615 (Coll. Borghese, Rome)

=== Japanese accounts of Europeans ===
Following contact with the Portuguese on Tanegashima in 1543, the Japanese were at first rather wary of the newly arrived foreigners. The culture shock was quite strong, especially because Europeans were not able to understand the Japanese writing system nor accustomed to using chopsticks.

They eat with their fingers instead of with chopsticks such as we use. They show their feelings without any self-control. They cannot understand the meaning of written characters. (from Boxer, Christian Century).

=== European accounts of Japan ===
The island of Jampon, according to what all the Chinese say, is larger than that of the Léquios, and the king is more powerful and greater and is not given to trading, nor are his subjects. He is a heathen king, a vassal of the king of China. They do not often trade in China because it is far off and they have no junks, nor are they seafaring men.

— Tomé Pires

The first comprehensive and systematic report of a European about Japan is the Tratado em que se contêm muito sucinta e abreviadamente algumas contradições e diferenças de costumes entre a gente de Europa e esta província de Japão of Luís Fróis, in which he described Japanese life concerning the roles and duties of men and women, children, Japanese food, weapons, medicine, medical treatment, diseases, books, houses, gardens, horses, ships and cultural aspects of Japanese life like dances and music. Several decades later, when Hasekura Tsunenaga became the first Japanese official arriving in Europe, his presence, habits and cultural mannerisms gave rise to many picturesque descriptions circulating among the public:

"They never touch food with their fingers, but instead use two small sticks that they hold with three fingers."
"They blow their noses in soft silky papers the size of a hand, which they never use twice, so that they throw them on the ground after usage, and they were delighted to see our people around them precipitate themselves to pick them up."
"Their Scimitar-like swords and daggers cut so well that they can cut a soft paper just by putting it on the edge and by blowing on it." ("Relations of Mme de St Tropez", October 1615, Bibliothèque Inguimbertine, Carpentras).

Renaissance Europeans were attracted by Japan's purported immense richness in precious metals, mainly owing to Marco Polo's accounts of gilded temples and palaces, but also to the relative abundance of surface ores characteristic of a volcanic country (this was before large-scale deep-mining became possible in industrial times). Japan was to become a major exporter of copper and silver during the period. At its peak, around 1615-25, as much as one third of global silver production was Japanese.

Japan was also noted for its comparable or even exceptional levels of population and urbanization relative to the nations of the West at the time (see list of countries by population in 1600). Many Europeans became quite fascinated with Japan, with Alessandro Valignano even writing that the Japanese "excel not only all the other Oriental peoples, they surpass the Europeans as well".

Early European visitors noted the quality of Japanese craftsmanship and metalsmithing. The later sources, most notably those written after the end of Japan's isolation period, also report Japanese blades, and swords in general, as good quality weapons with notable artistic value.

== Portuguese trade in the 16th century ==
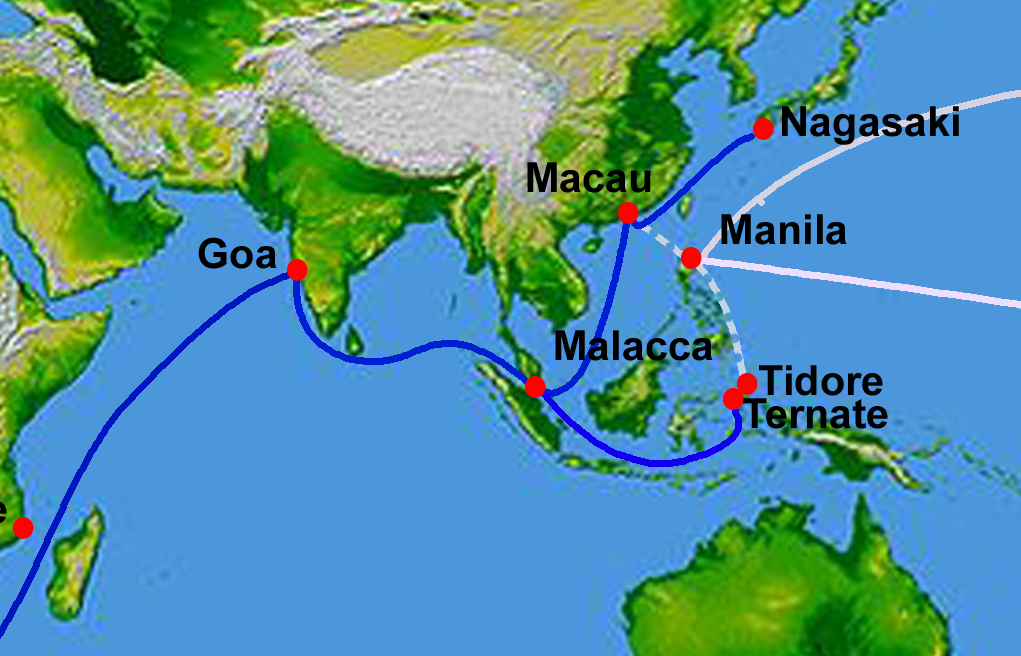
The Portuguese "Japan Route"

Ever since 1514, the Portuguese had traded with China from Malacca, and the year after the first Portuguese landfall in Japan, trade commenced between Malacca, China, and Japan. The Chinese Emperor had decreed an embargo against Japan as a result of piratical wokou raids against China. Consequently, Chinese goods were in scarce supply in Japan; Portuguese traders found a lucrative opportunity to act as middlemen between the two realms.

Trade with Japan was initially open to any, but from 1550, the Portuguese Crown monopolized the rights to trade with Japan. Henceforth, once a year a fidalgo was awarded the rights for a single trade venture to Japan with considerable privileges, such as the title of captain-major of the voyage to Japan, with authority over any Portuguese subjects in China or Japan while he was in port, and the right to sell his post, should he lack the necessary funds to undertake the enterprise. He could charter a royal vessel or purchase his own, at about 40,000 xerafins. His ship would set sail from Goa, called at Malacca and China before proceeding to Japan and back.

In 1554, Captain-Major Leonel de Sousa negotiated with Chinese authorities the re-legalization of Portuguese trade in China, which was followed by the foundation of Macau in 1557 to support this trade.

The state of civil-war in Japan was also highly beneficial to the Portuguese, as each competing lord sought to attract trade to their domains by offering better conditions. In 1571, the fishing village of Nagasaki became the definitive anchorage of the Portuguese and in 1580, its lord, Omura Sumitada, the first Japanese lord to convert to Christianity, leased it to the Jesuits "in perpetuity". The city subsequently evolved from an unimportant fishing village to a prosperous and cosmopolitan community, the entirety of which was Christian. In time, the city would be graced with a painting school, a hospital, a charitable institution (the Misericórdia) and a Jesuit college.

=== Vessels ===
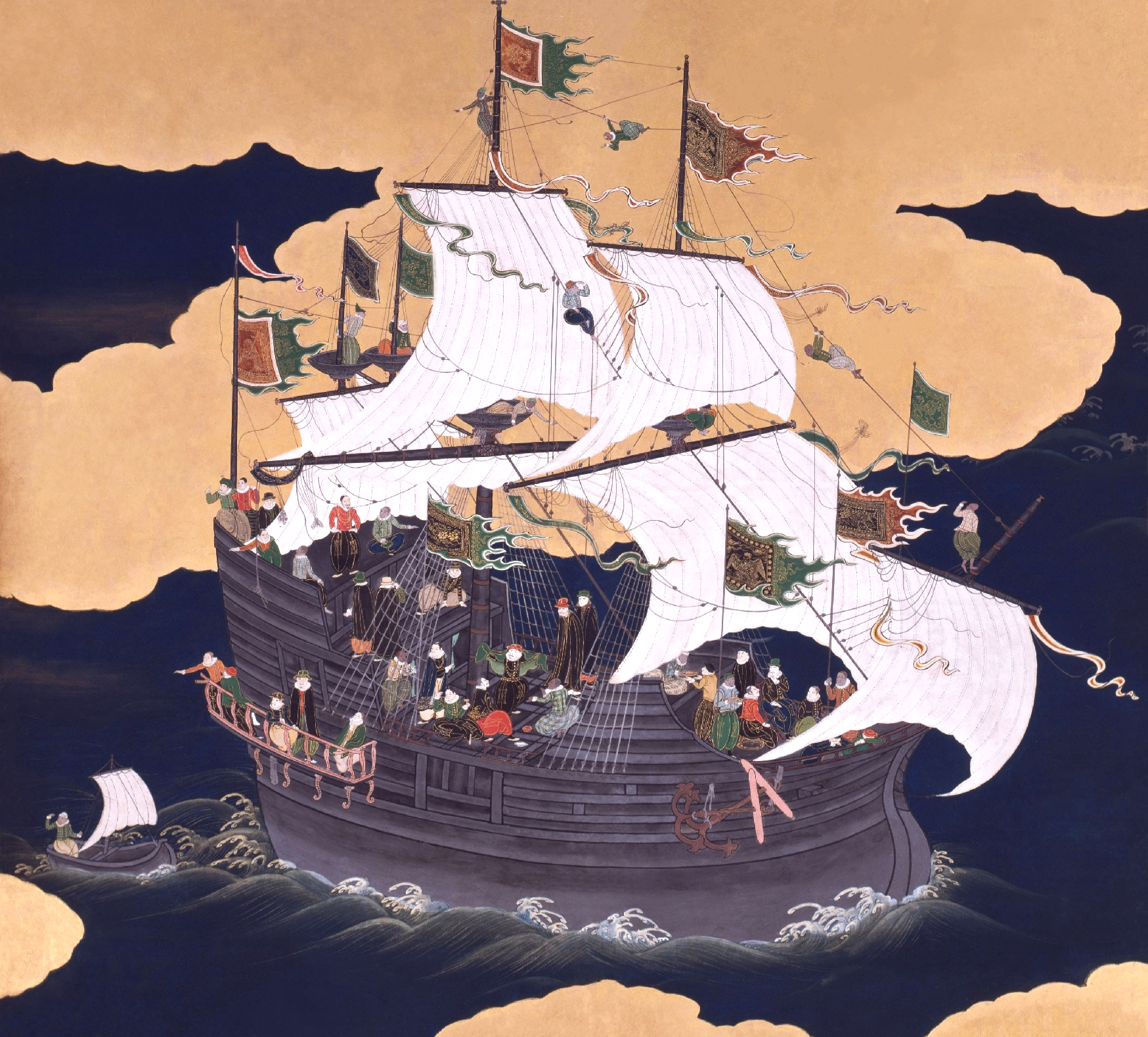
A Portuguese carrack in Nagasaki, 17th century.

Portuguese traders landing in Nagasaki

Among the vessels involved in the trade linking Goa and Japan, the most famous were Portuguese carracks, slow but large enough to hold a great deal of merchandise and enough provisions to travel safely through such a lengthy and often hazardous (because of pirates) journey. These ships initially had about 400–600 tons burden but later on could reach as many as over 1200 or 1600 tons in cargo capacity, a rare few reaching as many as 2000 tons — they were the largest vessels afloat on Earth, and easily twice or three times larger than common galleons of the time, rivalled only in size by the Spanish Manila galleons. Many of these were built at the royal Indo-Portuguese shipyards at Goa, Bassein, or Daman, out of high-quality Indian teakwood rather than European pine, and their build quality became renowned; the Spanish in Manila favoured Portuguese-built vessels, and commented that they were not only cheaper than their own, but "lasted ten times as long".

The Portuguese referred to this vessel as the nau da prata ("silver carrack") or nau do trato ("trade carrack"); the Japanese dubbed them kurofune, meaning "black ships", on account of the colour of their hulls, painted black with pitch for water-tightening, and later the name was extended to refer to Matthew C. Perry's black warships that reopened Japan to the wider world in 1853.

In the 16th century, large junks belonging to private owners from Macau often accompanied the great ship to Japan, about two or three; these could reach about 400 or 500 tons burden. After 1618, the Portuguese switched to using smaller and more maneuverable pinnaces and galliots, to avoid interception from Dutch raiders.

=== Traded goods ===
By far the most valuable commodities exchanged in the "nanban trade" were Chinese silks for Japanese silver, which was then traded in China for more silk. Although accurate statistics are lacking, it has been estimated that roughly half of Japan's yearly silver output was exported, most of it through the Wokou (Japanese and Chinese), Ryukyuans, and Portuguese, amounting to about 18–20 tons in silver bullion. The English merchant Peter Mundy estimated that Portuguese investment at Canton ascended to 1,500,000 silver taels or 2,000,000 Spanish dollars. The Portuguese also exported surplus silk from Macau to Goa and Europe via Manila.

A Japanese lacquerware produced and exported at the request of the Society of Jesus. Azuchi–Momoyama period, 16th century, Kyushu National Museum

Nonetheless, numerous other items were also traded, such as gold, Chinese porcelain, musk, and rhubarb; Arabian horses, Bengal tigers and peacocks; fine Indian scarlet cloths, calico and chintz; European manufactured items such as Flemish clocks and Venetian glass and Portuguese wine and rapiers; in return for Japanese copper, lacquer and lacquerware or weapons (as purely exotic items to be displayed in Europe). Japanese lacquerware attracted European aristocrats and missionaries from Europe, and western style chests and church furniture were exported in response to their requests.

Japanese and other Asians captured in battle were also sold by their compatriots to the Portuguese as slaves, but the Japanese would also sell family members they could not afford to sustain because of the civil war. According to Charles Boxer, both old and modern Asian authors have "conveniently overlooked" their part in the enslavement of their countrymen. They were well regarded for their skills and warlike character, and some ended as far as India and even Europe, some armed retainers or as concubines or slaves to other slaves of the Portuguese.

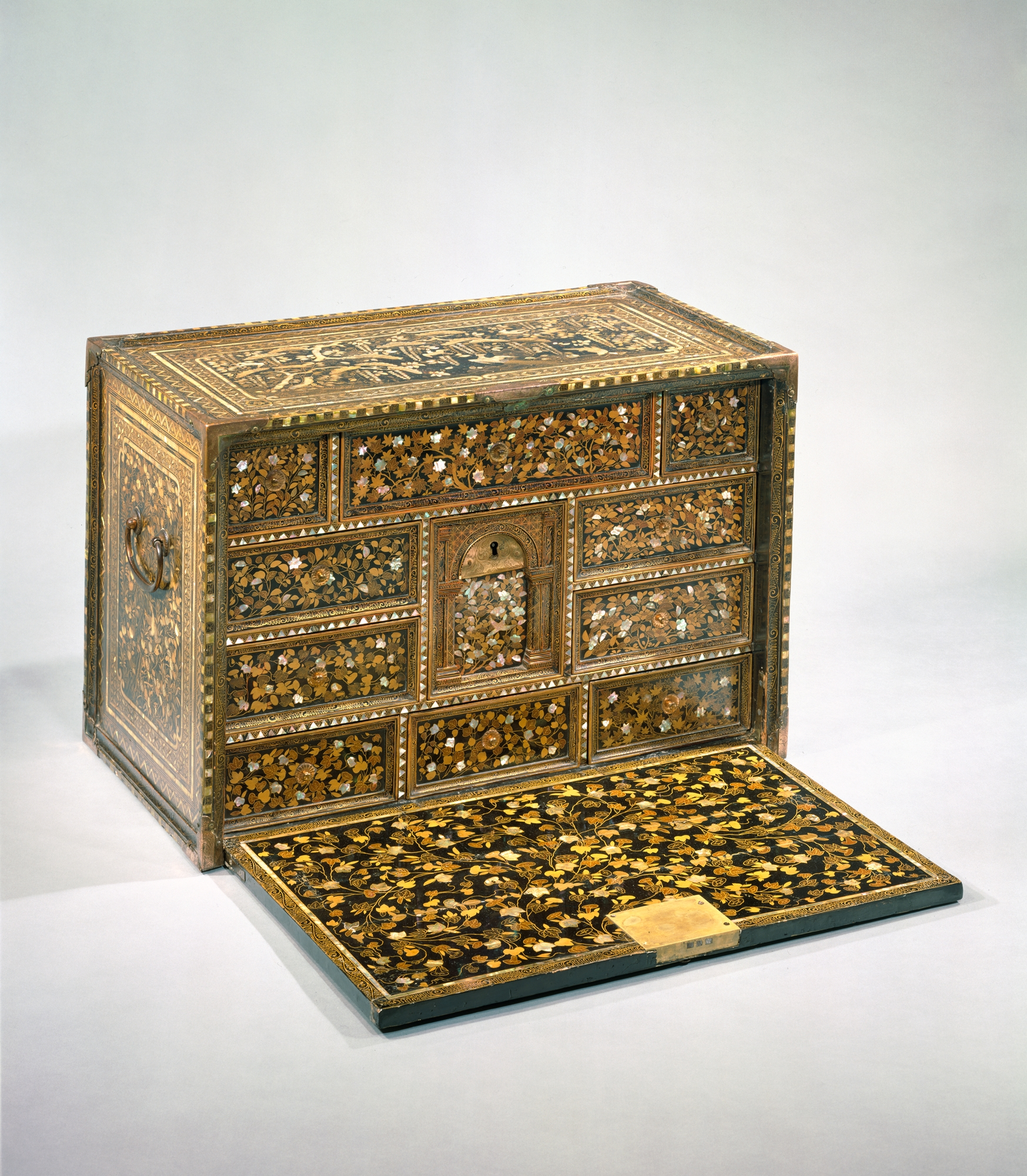
A maki-e and mother-of-pearl inlay cabinet that was exported from Japan to Europe in the 16th century. Metropolitan Museum of Art

In 1571, King Sebastian of Portugal issued a ban on the enslavement of both Chinese and Japanese, probably fearing the negative effects it might have on proselytization efforts as well as the standing diplomacy and trade between the countries. Toyotomi Hideyoshi, the de facto ruler of Japan, enforced the end of the enslavement of his countrymen starting in 1587 and it was suppressed shortly thereafter. However, Hideyoshi later sold Korean prisoners of war captured during the Imjin War as slaves to the Portuguese.

The overall profits from the Japan trade, carried on through the black ship, was estimated to ascend to over 600,000 cruzados, according to various contemporary authors such as Diogo do Couto, Jan Huygen van Linschoten, and William Adams. A captain-major who invested at Goa 20,000 cruzados to this venture could expect 150,000 cruzados in profits upon returning. The value of Portuguese exports from Nagasaki during the 16th century were estimated to ascend to over 1,000,000 cruzados, reaching as many as 3,000,000 in 1637. The Dutch estimated this was the equivalent of some 6,100,000 guilders, almost as much as the entire founding capital of the Dutch East India Company (VOC) (6,500,000 guilders). VOC profits in all of Asia amounted to "just" about 1,200,000 guilders, all its assets worth 9,500,000 guilders.

The monopoly of Portugal on trade with Japan for a European nation started being challenged by Spanish ships from Manila after 1600 (until 1620), the Dutch after 1609 and the English in 1613 (until 1623). Nonetheless, it was found that neither the Dutch nor the Spanish could effectively replace the Portuguese because Portugal had privileged access to Chinese markets and investors through Macau. The Portuguese were only definitively banned in 1638 after the Shimabara Rebellion, on the grounds that they smuggled priests into Japan aboard their vessels.

== Dutch trade ==
The Dutch, who, rather than "Nanban" were called "Kōmō" (Jp: 紅毛, lit. "Red Hair") by the Japanese, first arrived in Japan in 1600, on board the Liefde ("liefde" meaning "love"). Their pilot was William Adams, the first Englishman to reach Japan. In 1605, two of the Liefde's crew were sent to Pattani by Tokugawa Ieyasu, to invite Dutch trade to Japan. The head of the Pattani Dutch trading post, Victor Sprinckel, refused on the ground that he was too busy dealing with Portuguese opposition in Southeast Asia. In 1609 however, the Dutchman Jacques Specx arrived with two ships in Hirado, and through Adams obtained trading privileges from Ieyasu. The Dutch also engaged in piracy and naval combat to weaken Portuguese and Spanish shipping in the Pacific, and ultimately became the only westerners to be allowed access to Japan from the small enclave of Dejima after 1639 and for the next two centuries.

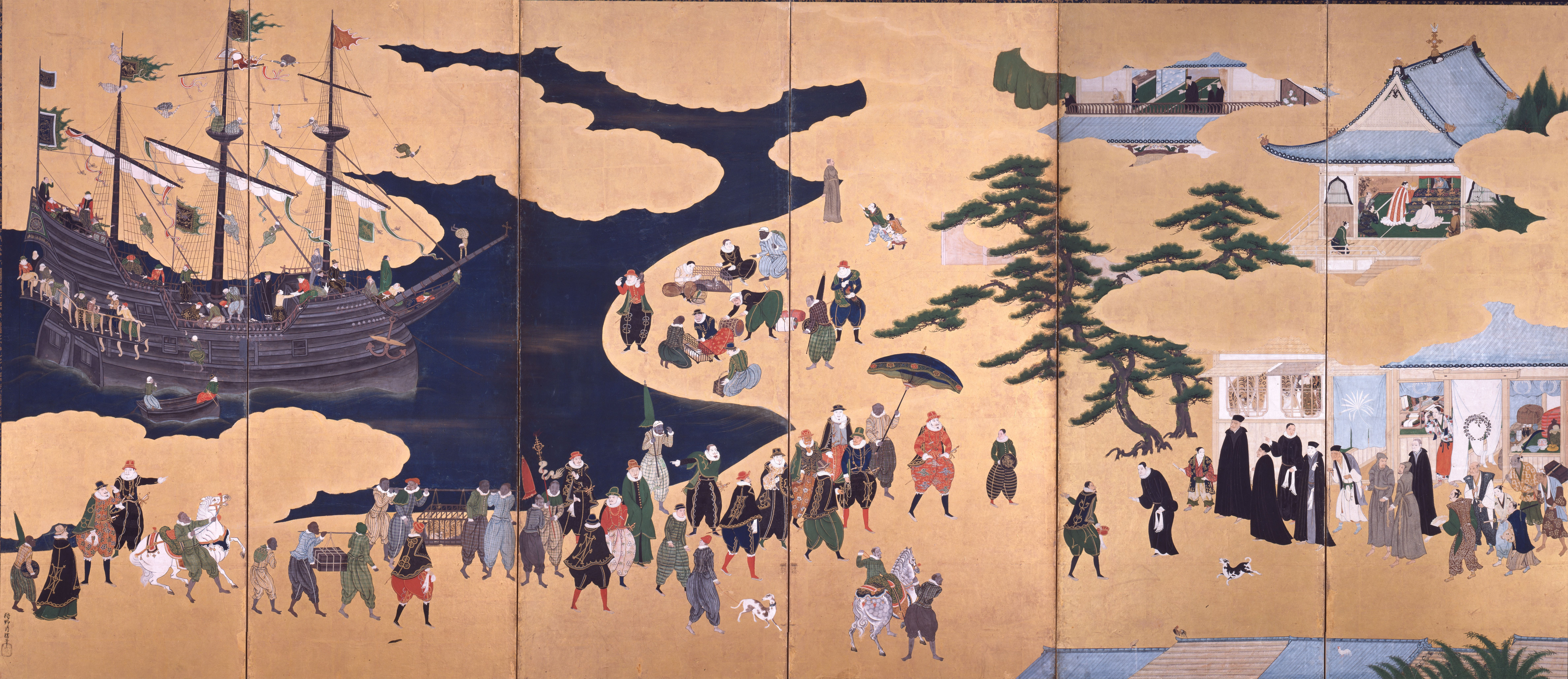
Nanban ships arriving for trade in Japan. 16th-century six-fold byōbu (lacquer and gilded screen), by Kanō Naizen

== Technological and cultural exchanges ==
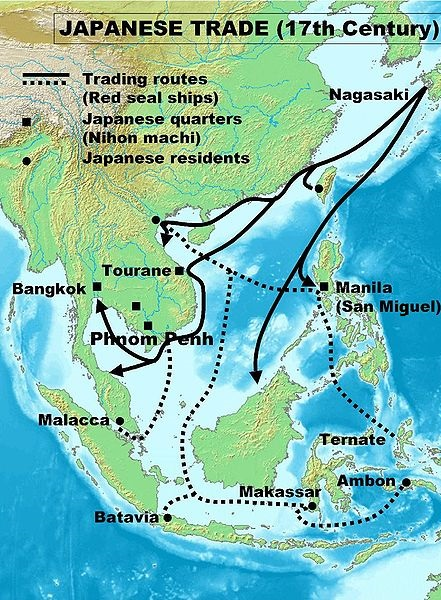
Japanese Red Seal trade in the early 17th century.

The Japanese were introduced to several new technologies and cultural practices (so were the Europeans to Japanese, see Japonisme), whether in the military area (the arquebus, cannon, European-style cuirasses, European ships such as galleons), religion (Christianity), decorative art, language (integration to Japanese of a Western vocabulary) and culinary: the Portuguese introduced the tempura and European-style confectionery, creating nanbangashi (南蛮菓子), "southern barbarian confectionery", with confectioneries like castella, konpeitō, aruheitō, karumera, keiran sōmen, bōro, and bisukauto. Other traded goods brought by Europeans to Japan were clocks, soap, tobacco, among other products.

=== Tanegashima guns ===
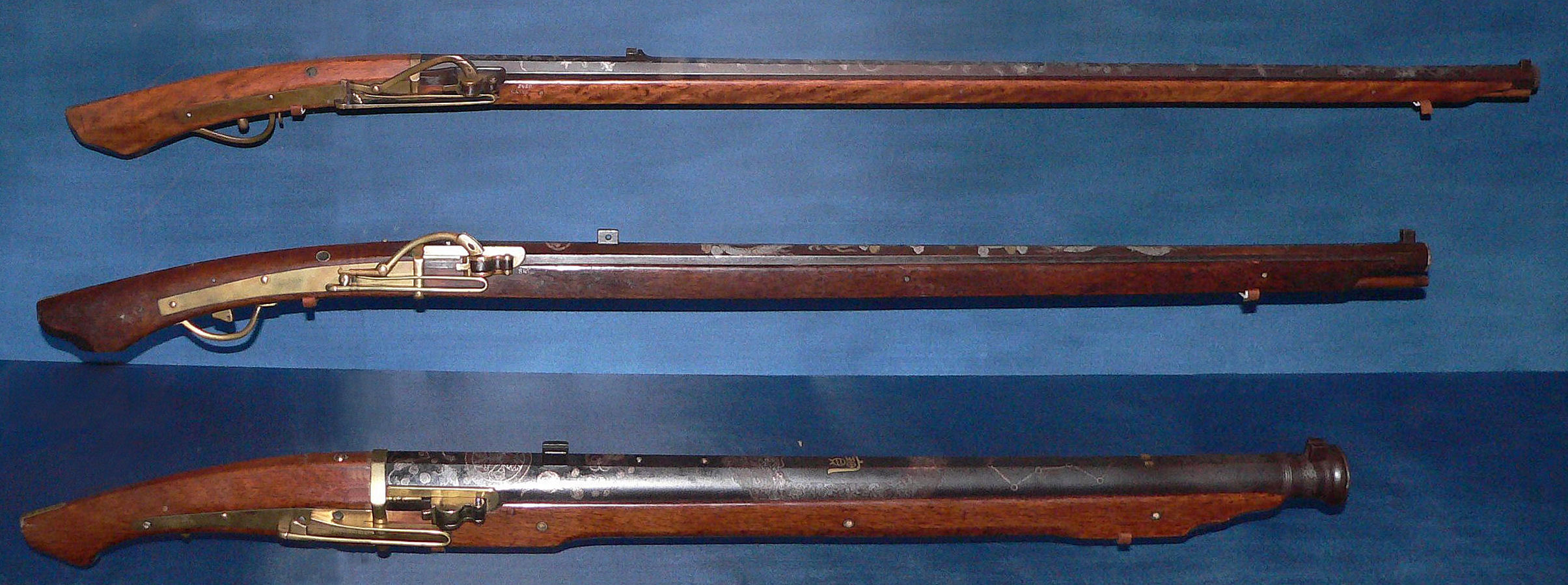
Japanese arquebus of the Edo era (Tanegashima).

One of the many things that the Japanese were interested in were Portuguese hand-held guns. The first two Europeans to reach Japan in the year 1543 were the Portuguese traders António da Mota and Francisco Zeimoto (Fernão Mendes Pinto claimed to have arrived on this ship as well, but this is in direct conflict with other data he presents), arriving on a Chinese ship at the southern island of Tanegashima where they introduced hand-held guns for trade. The Japanese were already familiar with gunpowder weaponry (invented by, and transmitted from China), and had been using basic Chinese originated guns and cannon tubes called "teppō" (鉄砲 "iron cannon") for around 270 years before the arrival of the Portuguese. In comparison, the Portuguese guns were light, had a matchlock firing mechanism, and were easy to aim. Because the Portuguese-made firearms were introduced into Tanegashima, the arquebus was ultimately called Tanegashima in Japan. At that time, Japan was in the middle of a civil war called the Sengoku period (Warring States period).

Within a year after the first trade in guns, Japanese swordsmiths and ironsmiths managed to reproduce the matchlock mechanism and mass-produce the Portuguese guns. Early issues due to Japanese inexperience were corrected with the help of Portuguese blacksmiths. The Japanese soon worked on various techniques to improve the effectiveness of their guns and even developed larger caliber barrels and ammunition to increase lethality. Barely fifty years later, Japanese armies dwarfed any contemporary European army in the use of guns. Guns were also strongly instrumental in the unification efforts of Toyotomi Hideyoshi and Tokugawa Ieyasu, as well as in the invasions of Korea in 1592 and 1597.

=== Red Seal ships ===
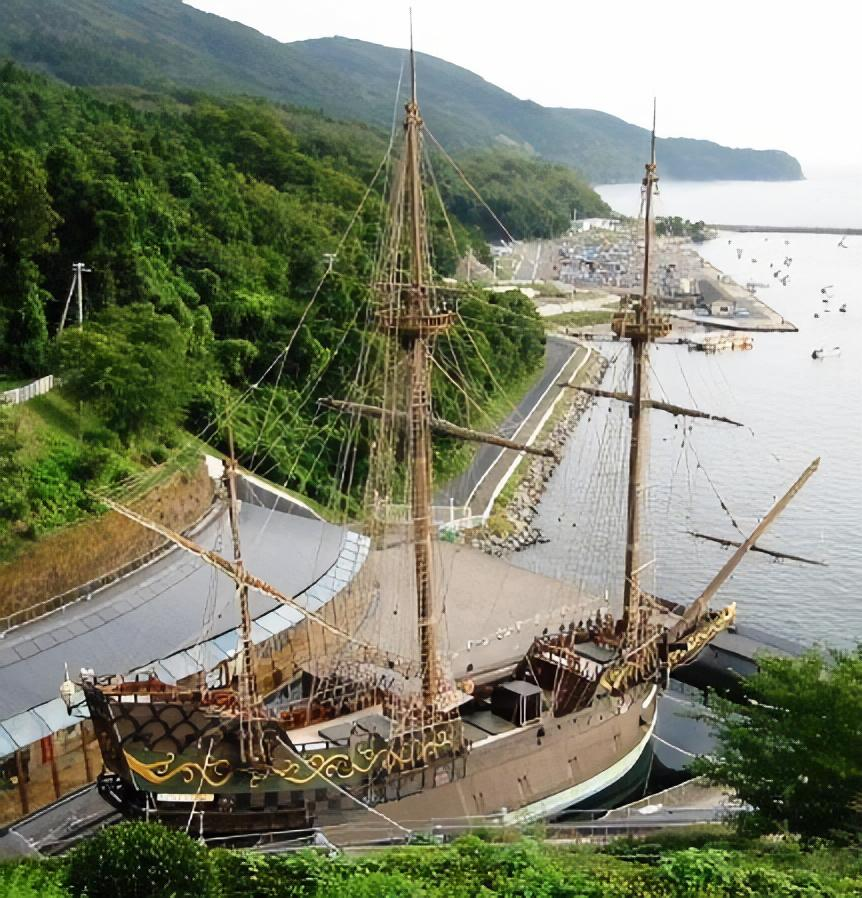
The Japanese-built 1613 galleon San Juan Bautista, in Ishinomaki, Japan (replica).

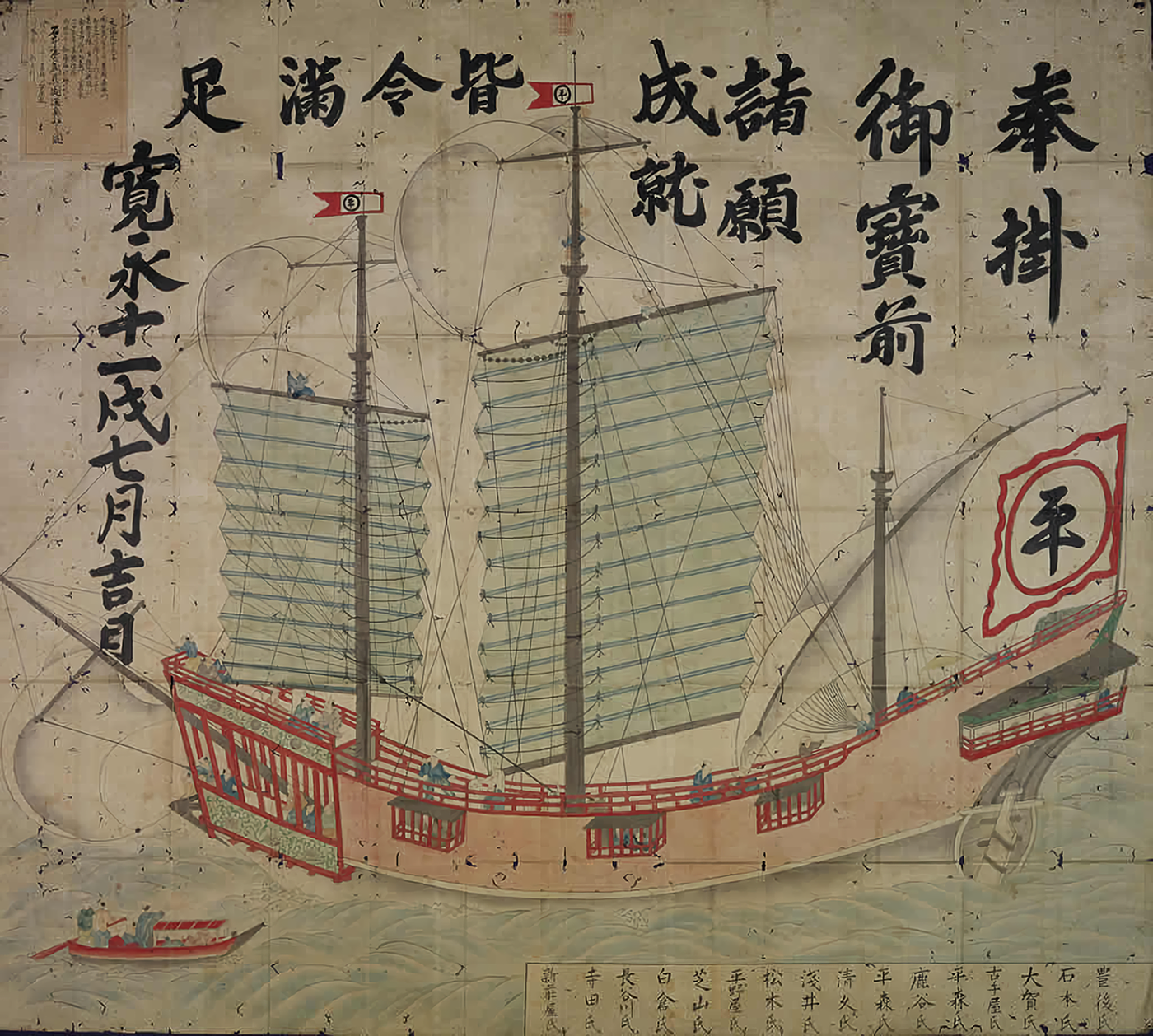
A 1634 Japanese Red Seal ship, incorporating junk rigged Western-style square and lateen sails, rudder and aft designs with 6 to 8 cannons.

European ships (galleons) were also quite influential in the Japanese shipbuilding industry and actually stimulated many Japanese ventures abroad.

The Shogunate established a system of commercial ventures on licensed ships called Red Seal ships, which sailed throughout East and Southeast Asia for trade. These ships incorporated many elements of galleon design, such as sails, rudder, and gun disposition. They brought to Southeast Asian ports many Japanese traders and adventurers, who sometimes became quite influential in local affairs, such as the adventurer Yamada Nagamasa in Siam, or later became Japanese popular icons, such as Tenjiku Tokubei.

By the beginning of the 17th century, the shogunate had built, usually with the help of foreign experts, several ships of purely Nanban design, such as the galleon San Juan Bautista, which crossed the Pacific two times on embassies to Nueva España (Mexico).

=== Catholicism in Japan ===
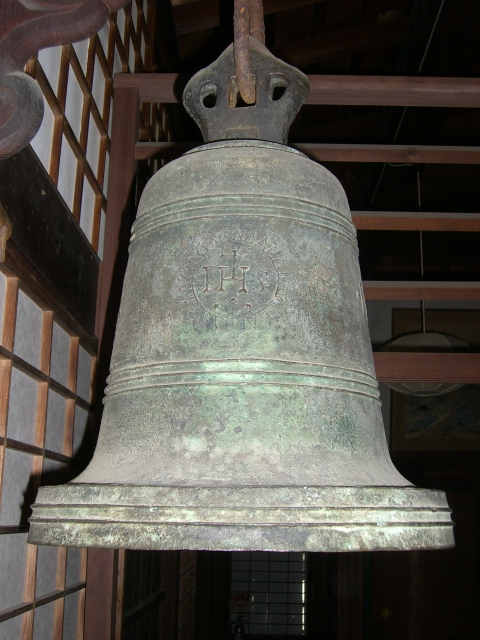
The Bell of Nanbanji, made in Portugal for Nanbanji Church, established by Jesuits in 1576 and destroyed 1587, Japan

With the arrival of the leading Jesuit Francis Xavier in 1549, Catholicism progressively developed as a major religious force in Japan. Although the tolerance of Western "padres" was initially linked to trade, Catholics could claim around 200,000 converts by the end of the 16th century, mainly located in the southern island of Kyushu. The Jesuits managed to obtain jurisdiction over the trading city of Nagasaki.

The first reaction from the kampaku Hideyoshi came in 1587 when he promulgated the interdiction of Christianity and ordered the departure of all "padres". This resolution was not followed upon however (only 3 out of 130 Jesuits left Japan), and the Jesuits were essentially able to pursue their activities. Hideyoshi had written that:

"1. Japan is a country of the Gods, and for the padres to come hither and preach a devilish law, is a reprehensible and devilish thing ...
2. For the padres to come to Japan and convert people to their creed, destroying Shinto and Buddhist temples to this end, is a hitherto unseen and unheard-of thing ... to stir the canaille to commit outrages of this sort is something deserving of severe punishment." (From Boxer, The Christian Century in Japan)

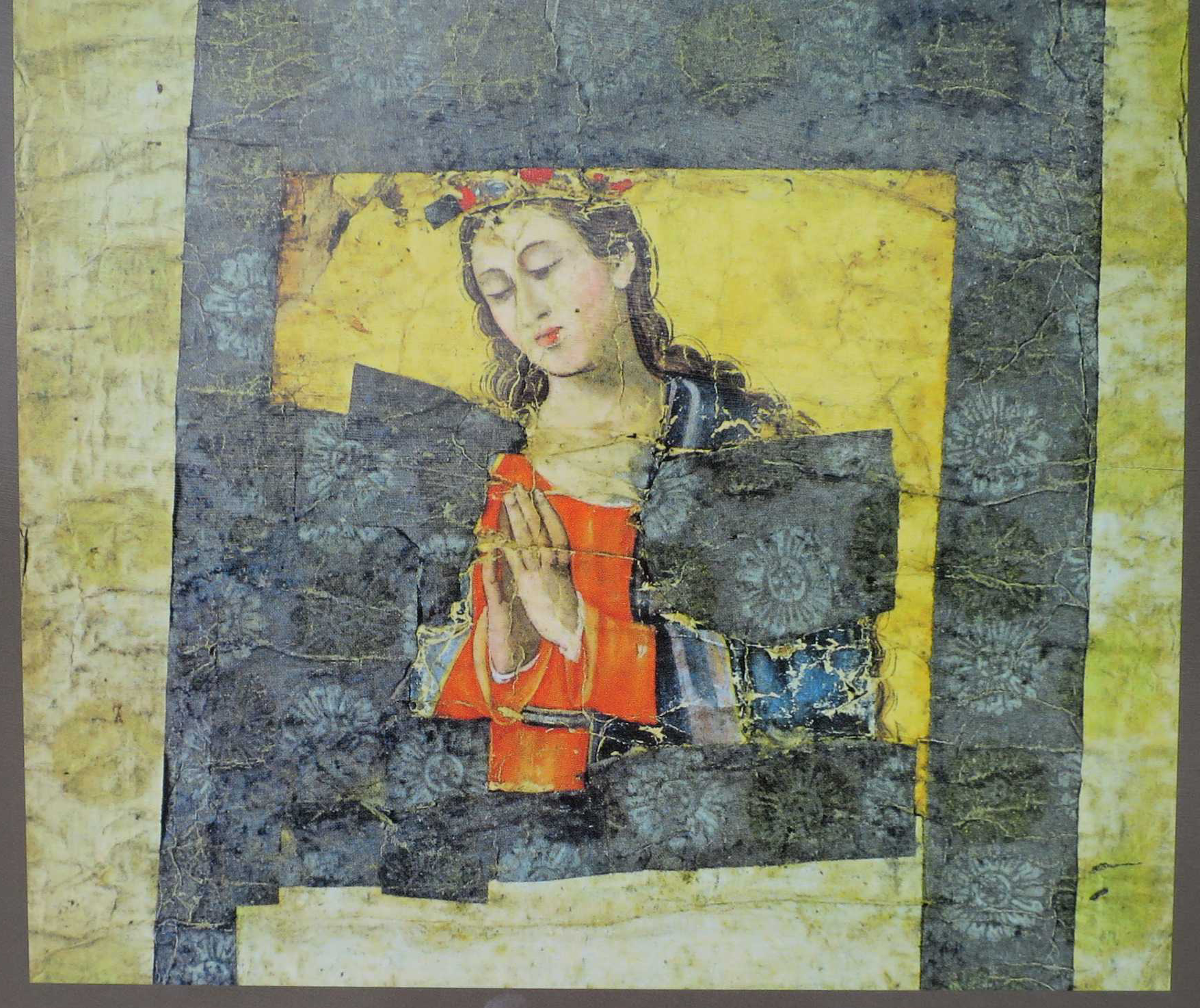
Saint Mary of the Snows hanging scroll (c. 1600)

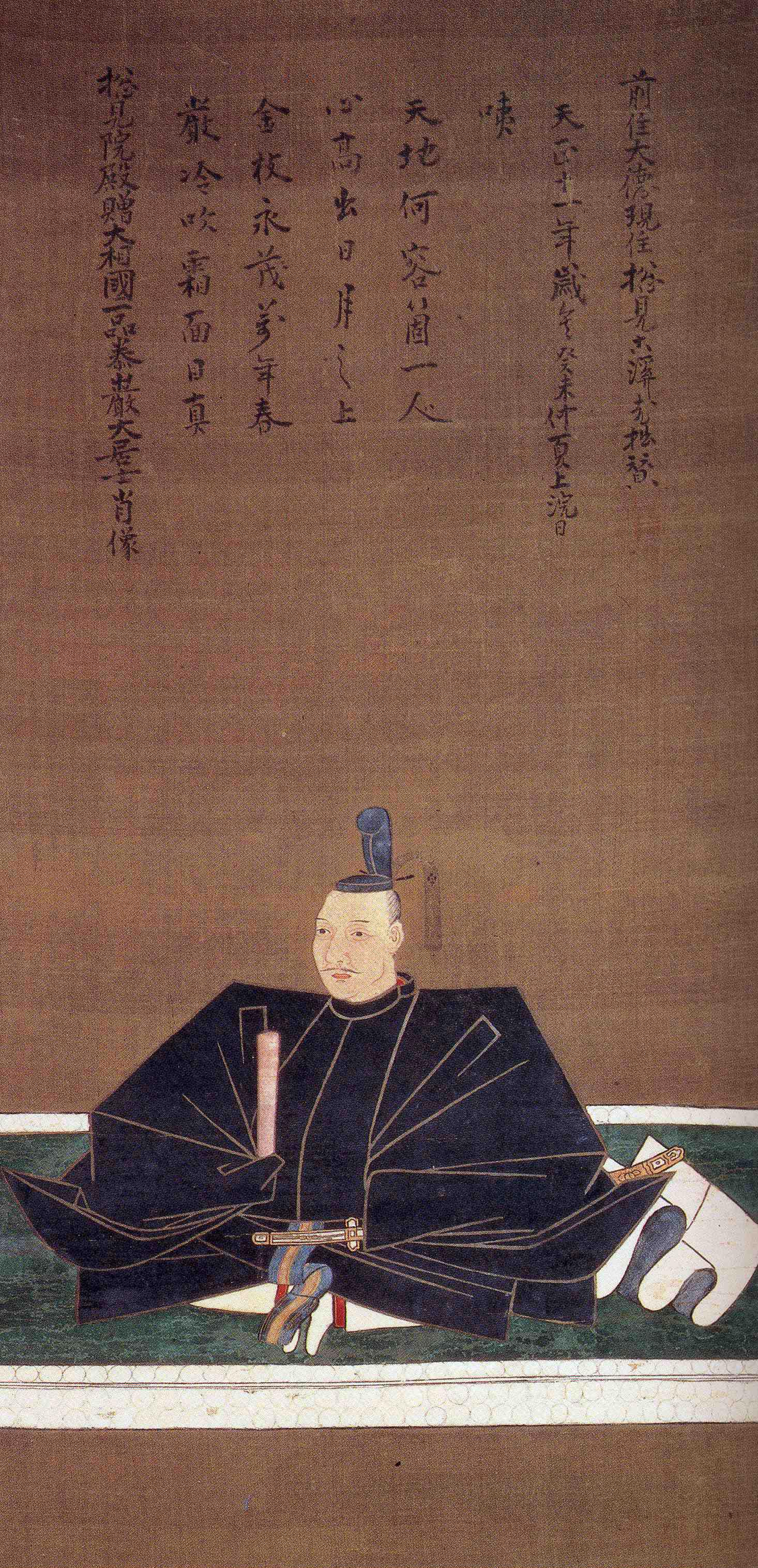
Portrait of Oda Nobunaga, circa 1583

Hideyoshi's reaction to Christianity proved stronger when the Spanish galleon San Felipe was wrecked in Japan in 1597. The incident led to twenty-six Christians (6 Franciscans, 17 of their Japanese neophytes, and 3 Japanese Jesuit lay brothers – included by mistake) being crucified in Nagasaki on February 5, 1597. It seems Hideyoshi's decision was taken following encouragements by the Jesuits to expel the rival order, his being informed by the Spanish that military conquest usually followed Catholic proselytism, and by his own desire to take over the cargo of the ship. Although close to a hundred churches were destroyed, most of the Jesuits remained in Japan.

The final blow came with Tokugawa Ieyasu's firm interdiction of Christianity in 1614, which led to underground activities by the Jesuits and to their participation in Hideyori's revolt in the siege of Osaka (1614–1615). Repression of Catholicism became virulent after Ieyasu's death in 1616, leading to the torturing and killing of around 2,000 Christians (70 westerners and the rest Japanese) and the apostasy of the remaining 200–300,000. The last major reaction of the Christians in Japan was the Shimabara rebellion in 1637. Thereafter, Catholicism in Japan was driven underground as the so-called "Hidden Christians".

=== Other Nanban influences ===
The Nanban also had various other influences:

- Nanbandō (南蛮胴) designates a type of cuirass covering the trunk in one piece, a design imported from Europe.
- Nanbanbijutsu (南蛮美術) generally describes Japanese art with Nanban themes or influenced by Nanban designs.
- Nanbanga (南蛮画) designates the numerous pictorial representations that were made of the new foreigners and defines a whole style category in Japanese art.
- Nanbannuri (南蛮塗り) describes lacquers decorated in the Portuguese style, which were very popular items from the late 16th century.
- Namban-ryōri (南蛮料理) refers to dishes that use ingredients introduced by the Portuguese and Spanish, such as Spanish pepper, winter onion, corn or pumpkin, as well as methods of preparation such as deep-frying (e.g. tempura).
- Nanbangashi (南蛮菓子) is a variety of sweets derived from Portuguese or Spanish recipes. The most popular sweets are "Kasutera", named after Castile, and "Konpeitō", from the Portuguese word "confeito" ("sugar candy"), and "Biscuit" (ビスケット), etc. These "southern barbarian" sweets are on sale in many Japanese supermarkets today.
- Nanbanji or Nanbandera (南蛮寺) were Christian churches in Japan. With support from Oda Nobunaga, the Jesuit Padre Gnecchi-Soldo Organtino established a church in Kyoto in 1576. Eleven years later (1587), this Nanbanji was destroyed by Toyotomi Hideyoshi. Currently, the church bell is preserved as "Nanbanji-no-kane" in Shunkoin temple in Kyoto.
- Nanbanzuke (南蛮漬) is a dish of fried fish marinated in vinegar, thought to be derived from the Portuguese escabeche.
- Namban-ryū geka (南蛮流外科), Japanese “Southern Barbarian-style surgery,” which adopted some wound plasters and the use of palm oil, pig fat, tobacco, etc. from the Portuguese. However, as a result of the increasingly severe persecution of Christians since the end of the 16th century, this status remained. In the middle of the 17th century, these Western elements were then incorporated into the newly emerged surgery in the style of the redheads (紅毛流外科 kōmō-ryū geka ), i.e . the Dutch one.
- Namban-byōbu (南蛮屏風), "Southern Barbarian screens", multi-part folding screens on which two motifs dominate: (a) the arrival of a Portuguese ship and (b) the procession of the landed foreigners through the port city.
- Chikin nanban (チキン南蛮) is a dish of fried battered chicken dipped in a vinegary sauce derived from nanbanzuke and served with tartar sauce. Invented in Miyazaki in the 1960s, it is now widely popular across Japan.

=== Linguistic exchange ===
The intensive exchange with the “southern barbarians” did not remain without influence on the Japanese vocabulary. Some loanwords from Portuguese and Dutch have survived to this day: pan (パン, from pão, bread), tempura (天ぷら, from tempero, seasoning), botan (ボタン, from botão, button), karuta (カルタ, from cartas de jogar, playing cards), furasuko (フラスコ, from frasco, flask, bottle), marumero (マルメロ, from marmelo, quince), etc. Some words are now only used in scientific texts or in historical context, e.g. iruman (イルマン, from irmão, brother in a Christian order), kapitan (カピタン, from capitão, captain), kirishitan (キリシタン, from christão, Christian), rasha (ラシャ, from raxa, type of cotton fabric), shabon (シャボン, from sabão, soap). Some things from the New World came to Japan along with their names via the Portuguese and Spanish, such as: tabako (タバコ, from tabaco, tobacco derived from the Taíno of the Caribbean). Some terms only known to experts today only became extinct in the 19th century: porutogaru-yu (ポルトガル油, Portugal oil, i.e. olive oil), chinta (チンタ, from vinho tinto, red wine), empurasuto (エンプラスト, from emprasto, plaster), unguento (ウングエント, from unguento, ointment).

== Decline of Nanban exchanges ==
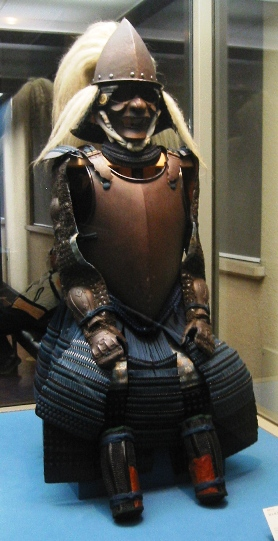
Nanbandō, a Portuguese style cuirass, 16th century.

After the country was pacified and unified by Tokugawa Ieyasu in 1603 however, Japan progressively closed itself to the outside world, mainly because of the rise of Christianity.

In 1639, trade with Portugal was definitively prohibited and the Netherlands became the only European nation to be allowed in Japan. By 1650, except for the trade outpost of Dejima in Nagasaki, for the Netherlands, and some trade with China, foreigners were subject to the death penalty, and Christian converts were persecuted. Travel abroad and the building of large ships were also prohibited. Thence started a period of seclusion, peace, prosperity and mild progress known as the Edo period. But not long after, in the 1650s, the production of Japanese export porcelain increased greatly when civil war put the main Chinese center of porcelain production, in Jingdezhen, out of action for several decades. For the rest of the 17th century most Japanese porcelain production was in Kyushu for export through the Chinese and Dutch. The trade dwindled under renewed Chinese competition by the 1740s, before resuming after the opening of Japan in the 1850s.

The "barbarians" would come back 250 years later, strengthened by industrialization, and end Japan's isolation with the forcible opening of Japan to trade by an American military fleet under the command of Commodore Matthew Perry in 1854.

== Usages of the word "Nanban" ==
Nanban (南蛮; "Southern barbarian") is a Japanese word borrowed from Chinese Nanman, which had been used to designate people from Southern China, the Ryukyu Islands, the Indian Ocean, and Southeast Asia centuries prior to the arrival of the first Europeans. For instance, according to the Nihon Kiryaku, Dazaifu, the administrative center of Kyūshū, reported that the Nanban (southern barbarian) pirates, who were identified as Amami islanders by the Shōyūki (982–1032 for the extant portion), pillaged a wide area of Kyūshū in 997. In response, Dazaifu ordered Kikaijima (貴駕島) to arrest the Nanban. The Japanese use of Nanban took a new meaning when it came to designate the early Portuguese who first arrived in 1543, and later extended to other Europeans that arrived in Japan.

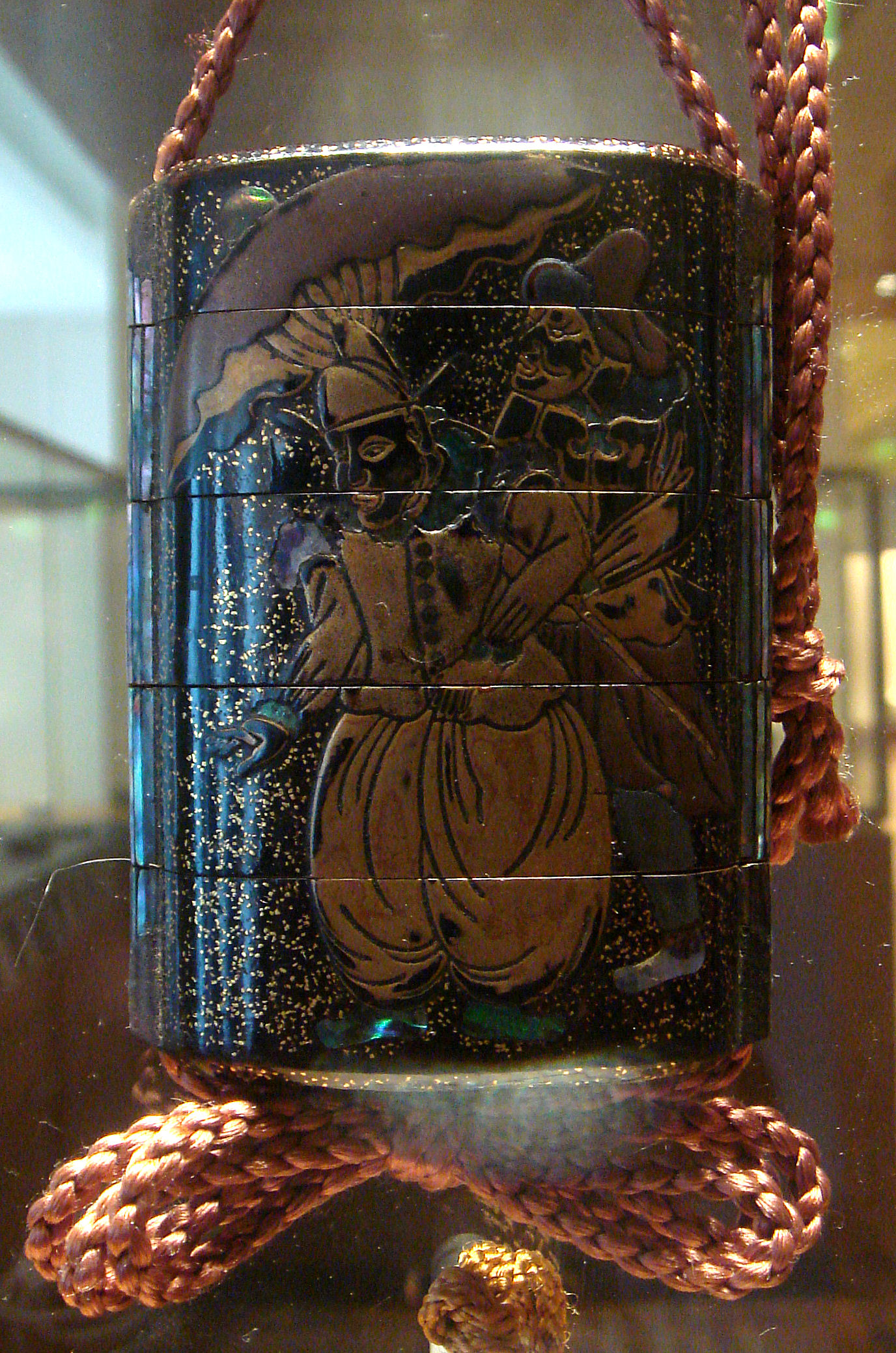
Japanese inro depicting Nanban foreigners, 17th century.

Strictly speaking, Nanban means "Portuguese or Spanish" who were the earliest Europeans in Japan, while the later Dutch and English were called " kōmōjin (紅毛人; red-haired people). After the Meiji Restoration, a modernized Japan decided to Westernize radically in order to better resist the West and essentially stopped considering the West as fundamentally uncivilized. Words like "Yōfu" (洋風 "western style") and "Ōbeifu" (欧米風 "European-American style") replaced "Nanban" in most usages.

Still, the exact principle of westernization was Wakon-Yōsai (和魂洋才 "Japanese spirit Western talent"), implying that, although technology may be more advanced in the West, Japanese spirit is better than the West's. Hence though the West may be lacking, it has its strong points, which takes the affront out of calling it "barbarian."

Today the word "Nanban" is often used in a historical context, and is essentially felt as picturesque and affectionate. It can sometimes be used jokingly to refer to Western people or civilization in a cultured manner.

In the context of cooking and cuisine, Nanban is used to refer to a cuisine which is of Portuguese origin, originally passed down by Japanese cooks who had observed the methods of visiting Portuguese cooks. Portuguese trade introduced a variety of ingredients to Japan, including chili peppers, corn, and sugar. Certain sweets which were introduced to Japan this way are still popular today: castella, bolo and konpeito.

== Timeline ==
- 1543 – Portuguese sailors (among them possibly Fernão Mendes Pinto) arrive in Tanegashima and transmit the arquebus.
- 1549 – Francis Xavier arrives in Kagoshima and introduces Christianity.
- 1556 – Luis de Almeida builds the first hospital, with Western medicine, in Ōita
- 1557 – Establishment of Macau by the Portuguese. Dispatch of annual trading ships to Japan.
- 1560 – Siege of Moji, the Otomo clan unsuccessfully attempt to seize the Mōri castle of Moji with three Portuguese ships.
- 1563 – Luís Fróis arrives in Japan.
- 1565 – Battle of Fukuda Bay, the first recorded naval clash between the Europeans and the Japanese
- 1570 – Japanese pirates occupy parts of Taiwan, from where they prey on China.
- 1571 – Daimyō Ōmura Sumitada assists the Portuguese in establishing the port of Nagasaki.
- 1575 – Battle of Nagashino, where firearms are used extensively.
- 1576 – Japan's first cannon is presented to Ōtomo Sōrin by Portugal.
- 1577 – First Japanese ships travel to Dang Trong, southern Vietnam.
  - – João Rodrigues arrives in Japan.
  - – A private Portuguese junk voyage to Japan is blown off course to Korea.
- 1579 – The Jesuit Alessandro Valignano arrives in Japan.
- 1580 – Ōmura Sumitada cedes Nagasaki "in perpetuity" to the Society of Jesus.
  - – Spain and Portugal enter in a dynastic union.
  - – Franciscans from Japan escape to Vietnam.
- 1582 – Tenshō embassy to Europe departs from Nagasaki.
- 1584 – Mancio Itō arrives in Lisbon with three other Japanese, accompanied by a Jesuit father. He was the first Japanese envoy to Europe.
- 1587 – Toyotomi Hideyoshi issues a document declaring the expulsion of Portuguese missionaries and freedom of trade.
- 1588 – Hideyoshi prohibits piracy.
- 1592 – Japan invades Korea in the Seven-Year War with an army of 160,000.
  - – First known mention of Red Seal Ships.
- 1597 – Martyrdom of 26 Christians (essentially Franciscans) in Nagasaki.
- 1598 – Death of Toyotomi Hideyoshi.
- 1600 – Arrival of William Adams on the Liefde.
  - – The Battle of Sekigahara unites Japan under Tokugawa Ieyasu.
- 1602 – Dutch warships attack the Portuguese carrack Santa Catarina near Portuguese Malacca.
- 1603 – Establishment of Edo as the seat of Bakufu government.
  - – Establishment of the English factory (trading post) at Bantam, Java.
  - – Nippo Jisho Japanese to Portuguese dictionary is published by Jesuits in Nagasaki, containing entries for 32,293 Japanese words in Portuguese.
- 1605 – Two of William Adams's shipmates are sent to Pattani by Tokugawa Ieyasu, to invite Dutch trade to Japan.
- 1609 – The Dutch open a trading factory in Hirado.
- 1610 – The Nossa Senhora da Graça incident near Nagasaki, leading to a 2-year hiatus in Portuguese trade
- 1612 – Yamada Nagamasa settles in Ayutthaya, Siam.
- 1613 – England opens a trading factory in Hirado.
  - – Hasekura Tsunenaga leaves for his embassy to the Americas and Europe. He returns in 1620.
- 1614 – Expulsion of the Jesuits from Japan. Prohibition of Christianity.
- 1615 – Japanese Jesuits start to proselytise in Vietnam.
- 1616 – Death of Tokugawa Ieyasu.
- 1622 – Mass martyrdom of 55 Christians (Great Genna Martyrdom).
  - – Death of Hasekura Tsunenaga.
- 1623 – The English close their factory at Hirado, because of unprofitability.
  - – Yamada Nagamasa sails from Siam to Japan, with an Ambassador of the Siamese king Songtham. He returns to Siam in 1626.
  - – Prohibition of trade with the Spanish Philippines.
  - – Martyrdom of 50 Christians (Great Edo Martyrdom)
- 1624 – Interruption of diplomatic relations with Spain.
  - – Japanese Jesuits start to proselytise in Siam.
- 1628 – Destruction of Takagi Sakuemon's (高木作右衛門) Red Seal ship in Ayutthaya, Siam, by a Spanish fleet. Portuguese trade in Japan is prohibited for 3 years as a reprisal.
- 1632 – Death of Tokugawa Hidetada.
- 1634 – On orders of shōgun Iemitsu, the artificial island Dejima is built to constrain Portuguese merchants living in Nagasaki.
- 1637 – Shimabara Rebellion by Christian peasants.
- 1639 – Definitive prohibition of trade with Portugal as result of Shimabara Rebellion blamed on Catholic intrigues.
- 1640 – Portugal leaves its 60-year dynastic union with Spain
- 1641 – The Dutch trading factory is moved from Hirado to Dejima island.

== See also ==
- History of the Catholic Church in Japan
- Nanban art
- Japanese–Portuguese conflicts
- Japan-Netherlands relations
- Japan-Spain relations
- Japan-Portugal relations
- Sengoku period
