= Soteriology =

Study of religious doctrines of salvation

Soteriology is the study of religious doctrines of salvation. Salvation theory occupies a place of special significance in many religions. In the academic field of religious studies, soteriology is understood by scholars as representing a key theme in a number of different religions and is often studied in a comparative context; that is, comparing various ideas about what salvation is and how it is obtained.

== Buddhism ==
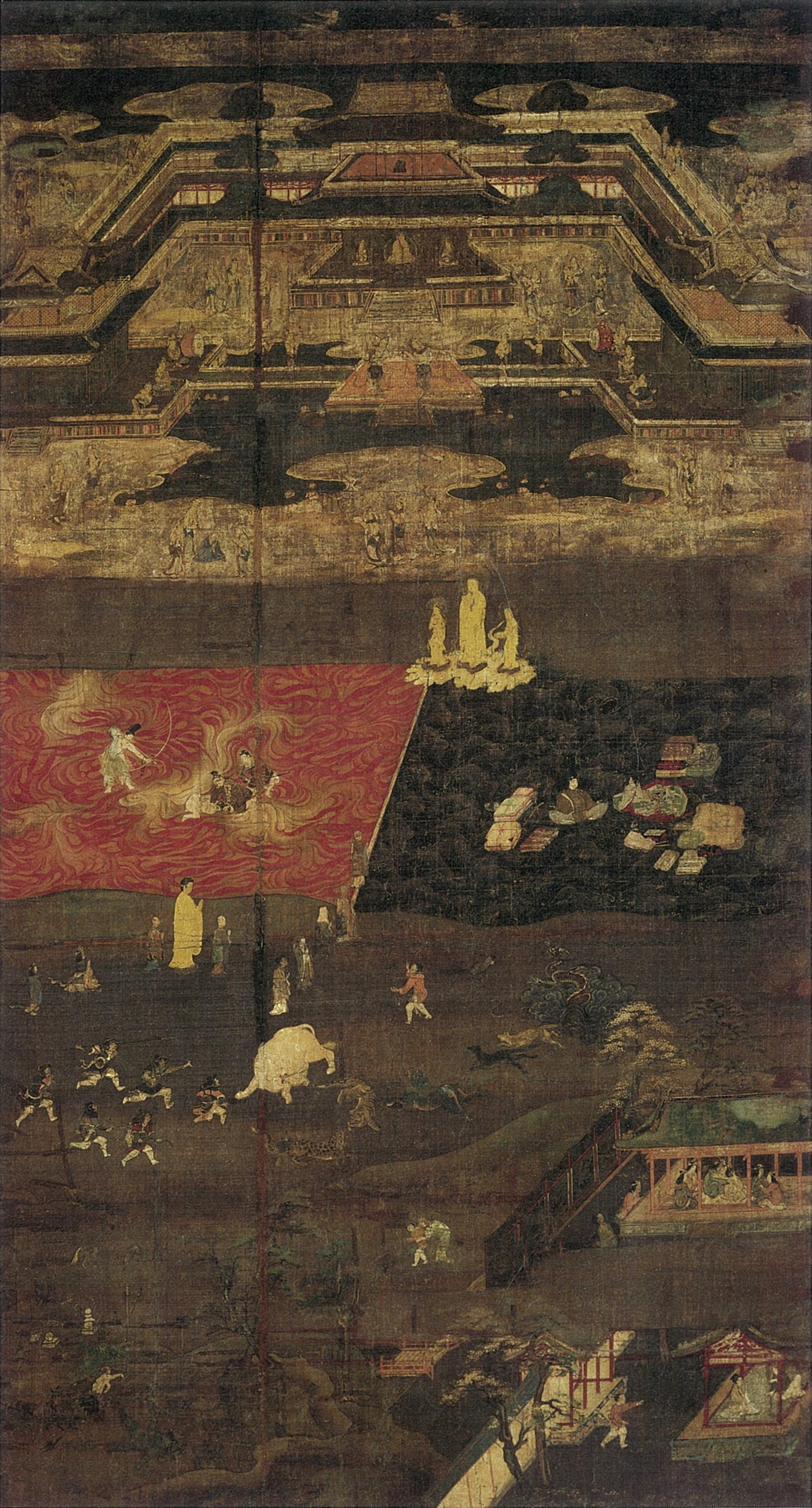
A 13th-century painting of the Kamakura period, depicting the Parable of the White Path, which illustrates the Pure Land path to salvation. Currently preserved in the Kōsetsu Museum of Art in Kobe, Japan.

Buddhism is devoted primarily to awakening or enlightenment (bodhi), Nirvāṇa ("blowing out"), and liberation (vimokṣa) from all causes of suffering (duḥkha) due to the existence of sentient beings in saṃsāra (the cycle of compulsory birth, death, and rebirth) through the threefold trainings (ethical conduct, meditative absorption, and wisdom). Classical Indian Buddhism emphasized the importance of the individual's self-cultivation (through numerous spiritual practices like keeping ethical precepts, Buddhist meditation, and worship) in the process of liberation from the defilements which keep us bound to the cycle of rebirth. According to the standard Buddhist scholastic understanding, liberation arises when the proper elements (dhārmata) are cultivated and when the mind has been purified of its attachment to fetters and hindrances that produce unwholesome mental factors (variously called defilements, poisons, or fluxes).

However, the Pure Land traditions of Mahāyāna Buddhism generally focus on the saving "other power" of the celestial Buddha Amitābha. The Pure Land tradition relies on the Buddha's power or blessings (adhiṣṭhāna) to achieve rebirth in a Buddha's "Pure Land", a superior divine realm where one can easily train for full Buddhahood by meeting the Buddha. Birth in the Pure Land is accomplished through the practice of mindfulness of the Buddha, which is called niànfó and entails reciting the name of the celestial Buddha Amitābha with a mind of faith, which links us to the Buddha's power. At the moment of death, the Buddha then transports us to the Pure Land. The Chinese and other mainland Pure Land traditions teach a synergistic soteriology in which one's own self-power links us to the Buddha's other power (which is still the main or "dominant condition" for salvation). This is called the doctrine of sympathetic resonance or "stimulus-response" (ganying). The Japanese Pure Land traditions meanwhile, teach that we must rely solely on other-power and abandon all self-powered efforts (which are useless and ego-centered).

== Christianity ==
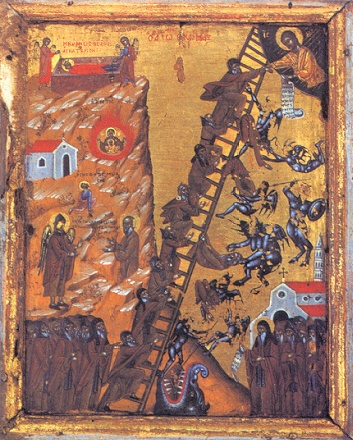
Eastern Orthodox icon of The Ladder of Divine Ascent (the steps toward theosis as described by John Climacus), showing Christian monks ascending and falling from the ladder to Jesus Christ. Currently preserved in the Monastery of Saint Catherine, Mount Sinai, Egypt.

The doctrine of salvation in Christianity, also called "deliverance" or "redemption", focuses on the saving of human beings from sin and its consequences. Variant views on salvation are among the main lines dividing the various Christian denominations, being a point of disagreement between Eastern Orthodoxy, Roman Catholicism, and Protestantism; in the history of the Protestant Reformation, the Calvinist–Arminian debate has been particularly influential. These lines include conflicting definitions of depravity, predestination, atonement, and most pointedly, justification. Christian soteriology ranges from exclusive salvation to universal reconciliation concepts.

Christology plays a key role in debates about soteriology. In the Catholic tradition, the Roman Catholic Church claims soteriological authority. In his Ninety-five Theses (1517), the Protestant Reformer Martin Luther rejected the soteriological authority of the Roman Catholic Church. Against this backdrop, the role of Christ's divinity takes so central a place in the theology of Søren Kierkegaard that it provides the basis for the proposition of Christ's power to save, and so in this way of thinking Christology precedes soteriology. In the debates over the ancient authorities of the Early Church, Christ's divinity and power over salvation are interconnected theological concepts.

== Epicurean philosophy ==
More than a century after the establishment of the Garden, the school in which Epicurus taught philosophy, some people in the Greco-Roman world regarded Epicurus as their "Savior" (Koine Greek: Σωτήρ, Sōtḗr). The most prominent soul saved by Epicurus was the Roman Empress Pompeia Plotina. Lucretius, author of De Rerum Natura, also depicts the salvific power of philosophy, and of his Scholarch Epicurus, by employing literary devices like the "Broken Jar parable" (where the Scholarch is credited with helping mortals to easily enjoy pleasure), poetry, and imagery.

The salvation of Epicurus has no otherworldly connotations whatsoever. Judging from his Principal Doctrines and Letter to Menoeceus, he salves his disciples from supernatural fears and excessive desires for what is not natural and gives his disciples clear ethical guidelines that lead to happiness. Lucretius says Epicurus has set the boundaries for the limits of nature. His followers in Roman times developed Epicurus into a cultural hero and revered him as the founding figure of his School, and as the first to have developed a fully naturalistic cosmology that emancipated mortals from all fear-based superstition.

== Hinduism ==
Soteriology is discussed in Hinduism through its principle of moksha, also called nirvana or kaivalya. "In India", wrote Mircea Eliade, "metaphysical knowledge always has a soteriological purpose." Moksha refers to freedom from saṃsāra, the cycle of death and rebirth. Soteriology is one of the four primary aims of human life (purusarthas), alongside dharma (duty), artha (wealth), and kama (pleasure). Rooted in the belief that existence is marked by suffering caused by ignorance, desire, and karma, moksha is seen as the ultimate liberation, often described in terms of nirvana (cessation), apunar-janma (non-return), or kaivalya (isolation). In Indian philosophy, different traditions such as Vedanta, Samkhya, and Yoga offer varied paths to moksha through knowledge, meditation, ethical action, or devotion (bhakti), but all regard it as the final resolution to human suffering and bondage.

== Islam ==
Muslims believe that everyone is responsible for their own actions. So even though Muslims believe that Adam and Hawwa (Eve), the parents of humanity, committed a sin by eating from the forbidden tree and thus disobeyed God, they believe that humankind is not responsible for such an action. They believe that God (Allah) is fair and just and one should request forgiveness from him to avoid being punished for not doing what God asked of them and for listening to Satan. Muslims believe that they, as well as everyone else, are vulnerable to making mistakes and thus they need to seek repentance repeatedly at all times.

Muhammad said, "By Allah, I seek the forgiveness of Allah and I turn to Him in repentance more than seventy times each day." (Narrated by al-Bukhaari, no. 6307) God wants his servants to repent and forgives them, he rejoices over it, as Muhammad said: "When a person repents, Allah rejoices more than one of you who found his camel after he lost it in the desert." (Agreed upon. Narrated by al-Bukhaari, no. 6309) Islamic tradition has generally held that it is relatively straightforward to enter Jannah (Paradise). In the Quran, God says: "If you avoid the great sins you have been forbidden, We shall wipe out your minor misdeeds and let you through the entrance of honor [Paradise]."

However, by direct implication of these tenets and beliefs, Man's nature is spiritually and morally flawed such that he needs salvation from himself. Finding appreciation, forgiveness, and joy in Allah is the only (or best) practice to be saved from this terrible fate of corruption and meaninglessness. al-Tahreem 66:8

=== Sufism ===
The focus on fanāʾ in Sufi thought, sometimes let to a dismissal on both paradise and hell as means of salvation, which often went hand in hand with a rejection of the present world. The prospect of paradise and fear of hell would distract the Muslim too much from devotion to God. Instead, one should throw away both worlds (al-takhalli min al-kawnayn) and focus solely on the reality behind them.

These Sufis considered the true meaning of hell to be separation from and heavenly bliss to be the union with God. An example of the typical Sufistic exclamation can be seen from Rabia of Basra:

"O Lord, if I worship You out of fear of hell, burn me in hell, andif I worship You in the hope of paradise, forbid it to me. However, if I worship You for Your own sake, do not deprive me of Your eternal beauty!"

Another radical rejection of paradise and hell can be found by Bayazid Bastami. He describes paradise as yet another veil, occupying people with temporal bliss rather than God. In his own mystical ascension, remniscient of Muhammad's Journey through the heavens, he describes the visions of paradise as nothing but another worldly distraction; the true goal of his quest is meeting God. By doing so, he also makes critical remarks about the inhabitants of the paradise, stating that "those who are in paradise are not in God" and "let them be fooled", because, once in paradise, they will realize that they are veiled from the greatest pleassure, which is meeting God. As such, he also dismisses hell's punishment as meaningless and even threats hell, if hell should torment the damned too harshly, he would reveal to them that "paradise is a game for children", easing their suffering by alleviating their disappointment of not having entered heaven.

Similarly, al-Shibli responded then asked about hell, that "fire and hell are but sugar in comparison with being separated [from God]." Al-Niffari proclaimed that entering hell would be the ultimate test for the Sufi, because once entered, "the Fire would be extinguished," but paradise would be populated only by "slaves". Once in hell, all worldly and intellectual properties will be burned until only union with God remains.

== Jainism ==
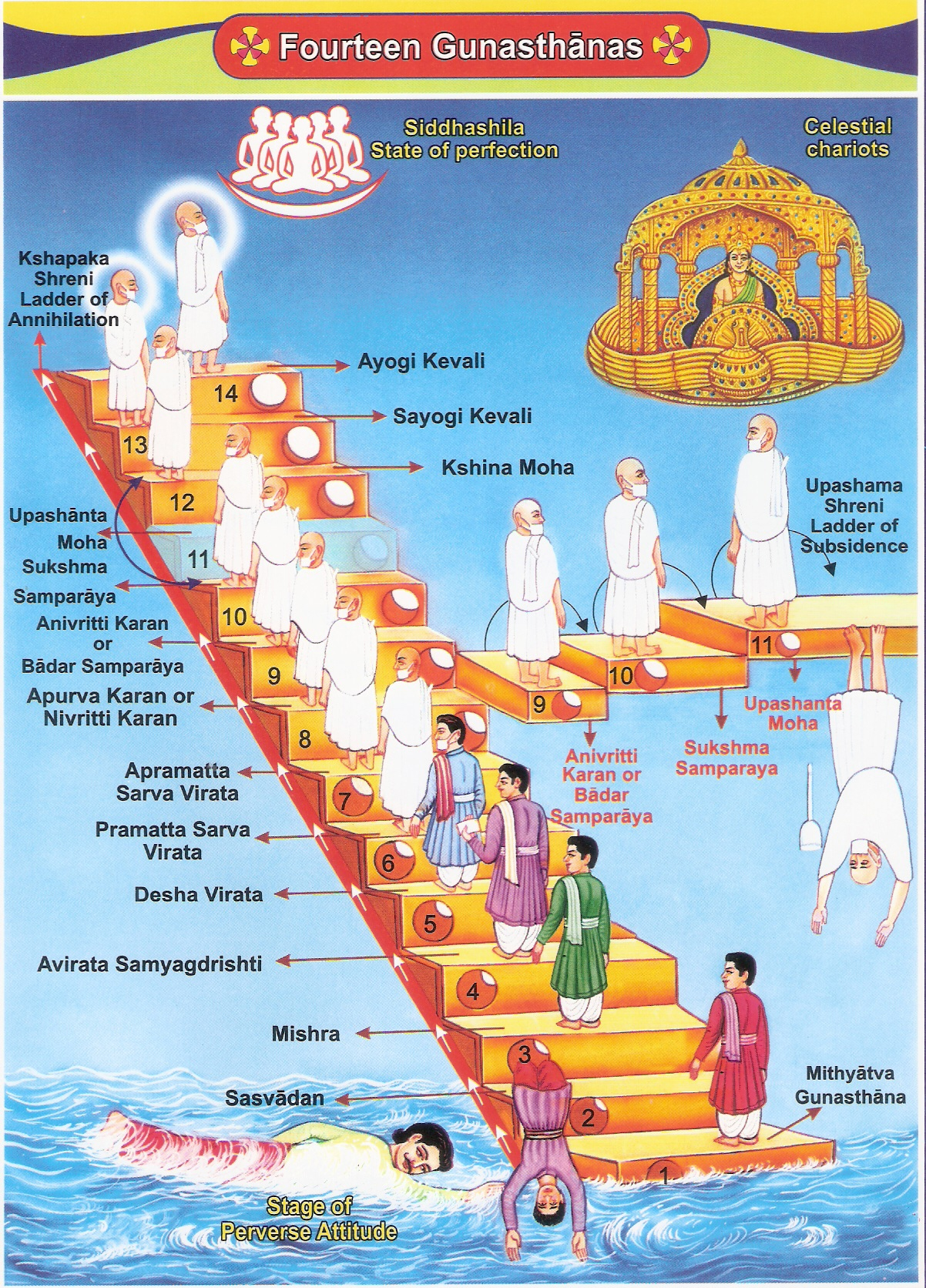
An illustration of the Gunasthanas

In Jainism, the soteriological concept is moksha, which is the final gunasthana. The Jain theory explains moksha differently from the similar term found in Hinduism. Moksha is a blissful state of existence of a soul, completely free from the karmic bondage, free from saṃsāra, the cycle of birth and death. It is the highest state of existence of a soul, even higher than the gods living in the heavens. In the state of moksha, a soul enjoys infinite bliss, infinite knowledge and infinite perception. This state is achieved through realisation of self and achieving a completely desireless and unattached state.

== Judaism ==
In contemporary Judaism, redemption (Hebrew ge'ulah) is God's gathering in the people of Israel from their various exiles. This includes the final redemption from the present exile. Judaism does not posit a need for personal salvation in a way analogous to Christianity; Jews do not believe in original sin. Instead, Judaism places greater value on individual morality as defined in the Law and embodied in the Torah—the teaching given to Moses by God on Mount Sinai and sometimes understood to be summarized by the Decalogue (Biblical Hebrew עֲשֶׂרֶת הַדְּבָרִים, ʿĂsereṯ haDəḇārīm, lit. 'The Ten Words'). The tannaitic sage Hillel the Elder taught that the Law could be further compressed into the single maxim popularly known as the Golden Rule: "That which is hateful to you, do not do unto your fellow".

In Judaism, salvation is closely related to the idea of redemption, or rescue from the states and circumstances that destroy the value of human existence. God, as the creator of the universe, is the source of all salvation for humanity (provided an individual honors God by observing God's precepts). So, redemption and/or salvation depends on the individual. Furthermore, Judaism stresses that one's salvation cannot be obtained through anyone else, invoking a deity, or believing in any outside power or influence.

Some passages in Jewish religious texts assert that an afterlife exists for neither the good nor evil. For example, the writer of the Book of Ecclesiastes tells the reader: "The dead know nothing. They have no reward and even the memory of them is lost." For many centuries, rabbis and Jewish laypeople have often wrestled with such passages.

== Mystery religions ==
In the mystery religions of the Greco-Roman world, salvation was less worldly and communal, and more a mystical belief concerned with the continued survival of the individual soul after death. Some savior gods associated with this theme are dying-and-rising gods, often associated with the seasonal cycle, such as Osiris, Tammus, Adonis, Ceres, Persephone, Dionysus. A complex of soteriological beliefs was also a feature of the cult of Cybele and Attis.

The similarity of themes and archetypes to religions found in antiquity to later Christianity has been pointed out by many authors, including the Fathers of the early Christian church. One view is that early Christianity borrowed these myths and motifs from contemporary Hellenistic mystery religions, which possessed ideas such as life-death-rebirth deities and sexual relations between gods and human beings. While Christ myth theory is not accepted by mainstream historians, proponents attempt to establish causal connections to the cults of Mithras, Dionysus, and Osiris among others.

== Sikhism ==
Sikhism advocates the pursuit of salvation through disciplined, personal meditation on the Naam Japo (name) and message of God, meant to bring one into union with God. But a person's state of mind has to be detached from this world, with the understanding that this world is a temporary abode and their soul has to remain untouched by pain, pleasure, greed, emotional attachment, praise, slander, and above all, egotistical pride. Thus their thoughts and deeds become nirmal or pure, and they merge with God or attain union with God, just as a drop of water falling from the skies merges with the ocean.

== Taoism ==
Becoming an enlightened person is what is considered salvation in many Taoist beliefs.

Some Taoist immortals were thought of as deceased humans whose souls achieved a superior physical form. Enlightened people were sometimes called zhenren and thought to be the living embodiment of the supernatural characteristics of the faith.

== Other religions ==
Shinto and Tenrikyo similarly emphasize working for a good life by cultivating virtue or virtuous behavior.

In an age that still saw salvation as primarily collective - based on the religion of the family, clan, or state - rather than the emerging province of the individual (as popularized by Buddhism and the mystery religions such as Mithraism). Hellenistic ruler cults from about 300 BCE sometimes promoted the revering of a king as the savior of his people. Prominent examples included Ptolemy I Soter of Egypt and the Seleucids Antiochus I Soter and Demetrius I Soter. In the Egyptian context, the deification of a ruler was built on traditional pharaonic religious ideas.

== See also ==
- Comparative religion
- Salvation
