= Nanban-ji =

Aspect of Christianity in Japan

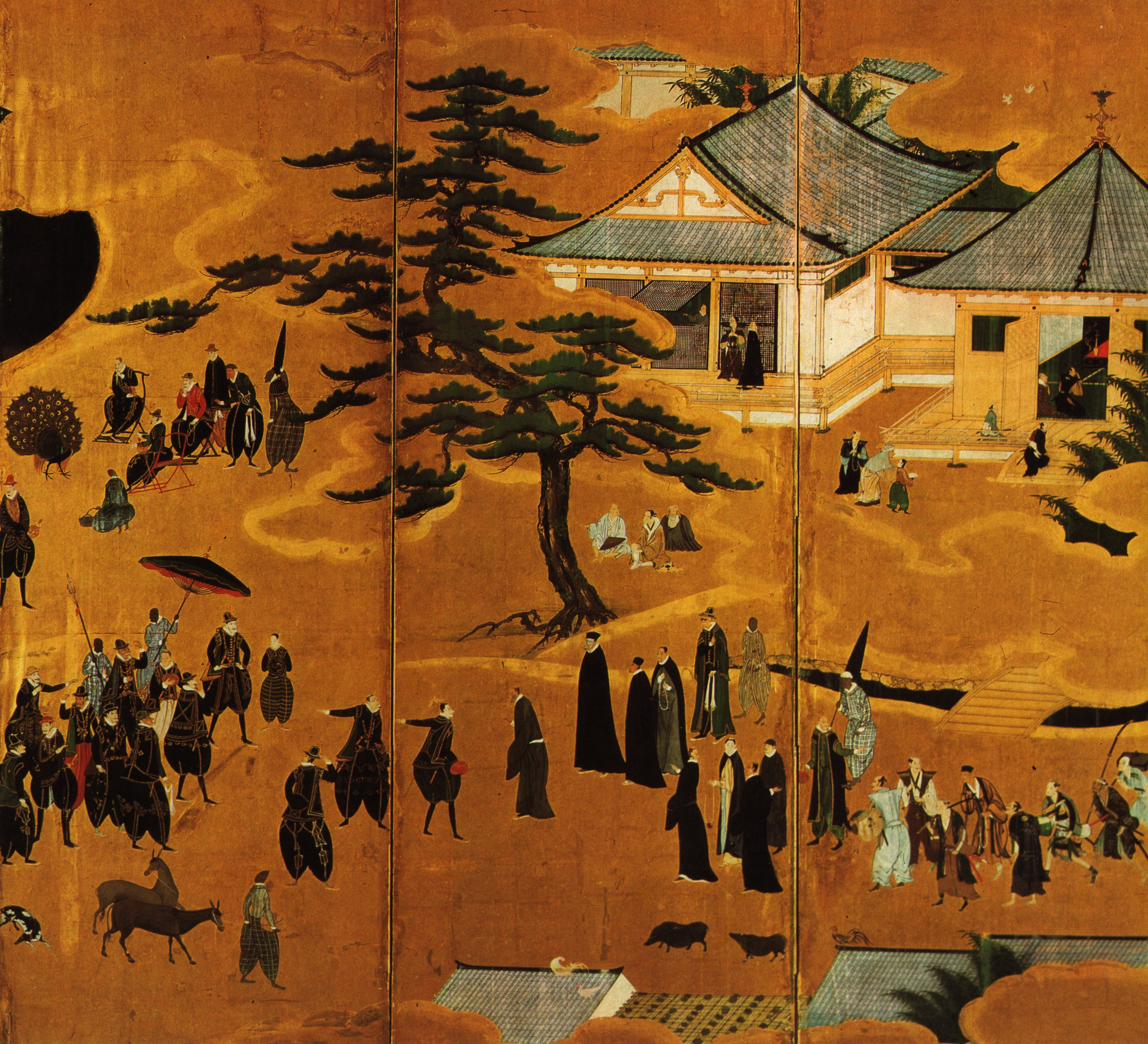
A Nanban-ji depicted on a Nanban byōbu

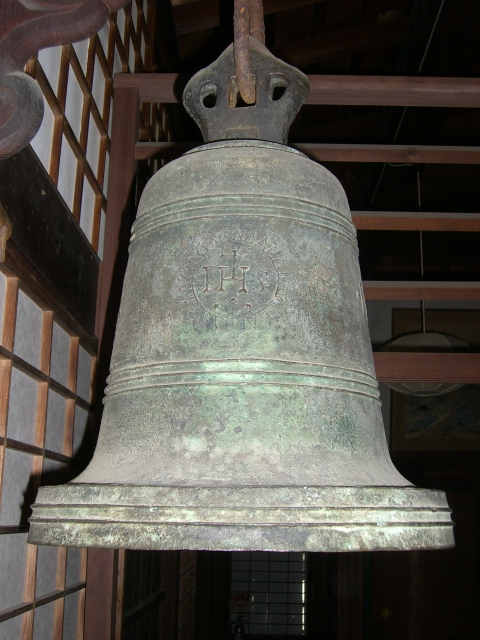
The Bell of Nanbanji, made in Portugal for Nanbanji Church, established by Jesuits in 1576 and destroyed 1587, Japan

Nanban-ji (南蛮寺, also pronounced Nanbandera) is a name applied to spaces or structures used by Christian missionaries and Japanese Christian converts in the early history of the Catholic Church in Japan. Whether converted from existing temples or built for purpose as churches and centers for Christian education, buildings known as Nanban-ji (temple of/for the southern barbarians) were present in Kyōto, Nagasaki, Hirado, Azuchi, Osaka, Kanazawa, Sunpu, and Edo. Using the term Deus for God, the temples were also called Daiusu-ji (だいうす寺) and Daiusu-dō (だいうす堂).

Structures known as Nanban-ji were destroyed from Toyotomi Hideyoshi's 1588 edict against Christians in Japan, with some fragments of construction remaining and eventually being deposited in museums. There are also depictions in contemporary art, and in the narratives of missionaries such as Luís Fróis.

== See also ==
- Christianity in Japan
- Nanban art, Japanese art of the sixteenth and seventeenth centuries influenced by contact with the Nanban
- Nanban trade, trade between Japan and Western countries from 1543 to 1614
