= Gnecchi-Soldo Organtino =

Italian missionary (1530–1609)

Gnecchi-Soldi Organtino (1530 – 22 April 1609) was an Italian missionary with the Society of Jesus, of Nanban period (1543–1650). He is an example of Nanbanjin (Barbarians from the south, as the Occidental were called), who visited Japan at that period.

He was sent to Japan in 1570 via Portuguese India and Portuguese Malacca. With the approval of Oda Nobunaga, Organtino built Nanban temple in Kyoto in 1576, then both monastery and church in Azuchi by Lake Biwa in 1580. He also opened a religious school. Organtino died in Nagasaki on 22 April 1609.
