= Kōsetsu Museum of Art =

- 香雪美術館
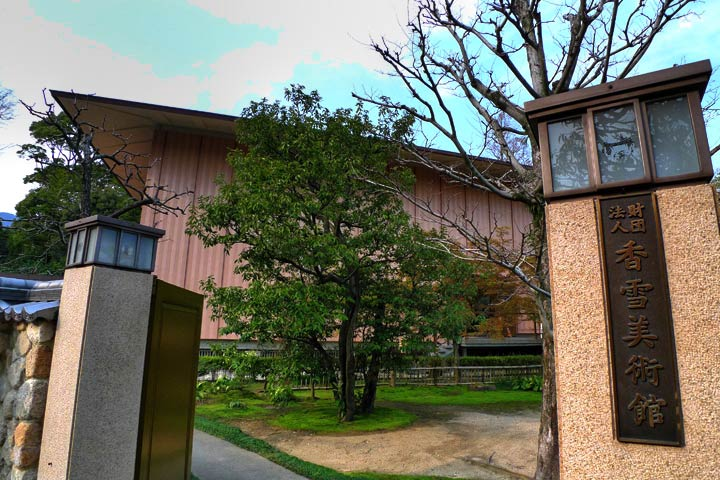
- Interactive map of the Kōsetsu Museum of Art area

General information
- Location: 2-12-1 Mikagegunge, Higashinada-ku, Kobe, Hyōgo Prefecture, Japan
- Coordinates: 34°43′25″N 135°15′21″E
- Opened: 1973

Website
- Official website

The Kōsetsu Museum of Art (香雪美術館, Kōsetsu Bijutsukan) is an art museum that opened in Kobe, Hyōgo Prefecture, Japan in 1973. The museum preserves, researches, and displays the collection of Japanese and East Asian artworks—including Buddhist art, calligraphic works, tea utensils, early-modern paintings, arms and armour, and lacquerware—built up by Murayama Ryōhei, also known as Kōsetsu, founder of The Asahi Shimbun. These works include nineteen Important Cultural Properties and twenty-three Important Works of Fine Arts. In December 2021, the museum closed for an extended period of renovation, although exhibition activities continue through the Nakanoshima Kōsetsu Museum of Art in Osaka.

== See also ==
- Hakutsuru Fine Art Museum
- Kobe City Museum
