= Shunkō-in =

Zen Buddhist temple in Kyoto, Japan

Coordinates: 35.024045°N 135.719475°E

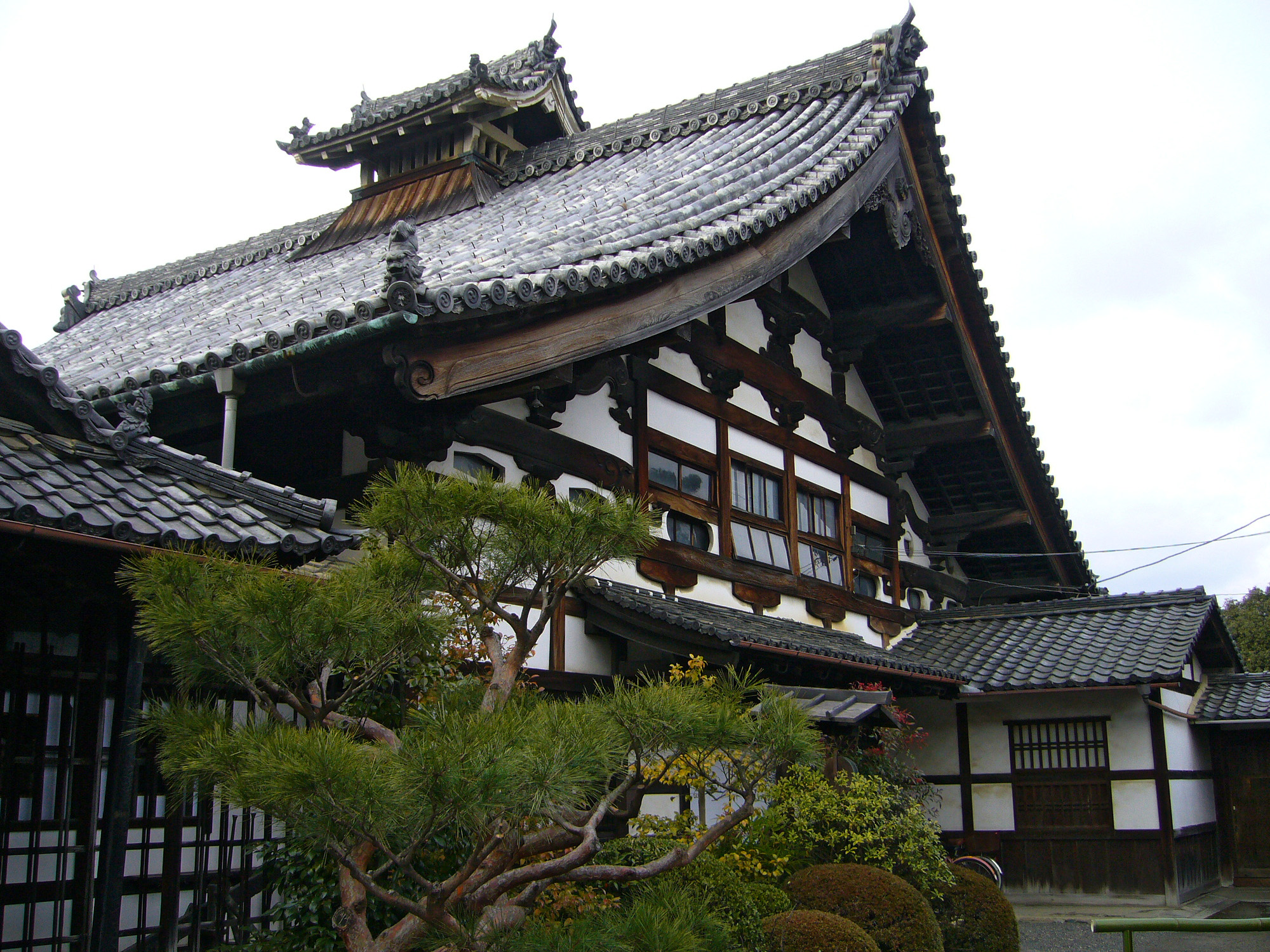
Shunkō-in

Shunkō-in (春光院, Temple of the Ray of Spring Light) is a Zen Buddhist temple in Kyoto, Japan and belongs to the Myōshin-ji (Temple of Excellent Mind) school, which is the largest among 14 Japanese Rinzai Zen Buddhist schools. The temple was established in 1590 by Horio Yoshiharu, who was a feudal lord, or daimyō, of Matsue in present-day Shimane Prefecture. This temple houses important historical objects that reflect the multifaceted religious and artistic atmosphere in Japan from the sixteenth century onward.

== The bell of Nanban-ji ==
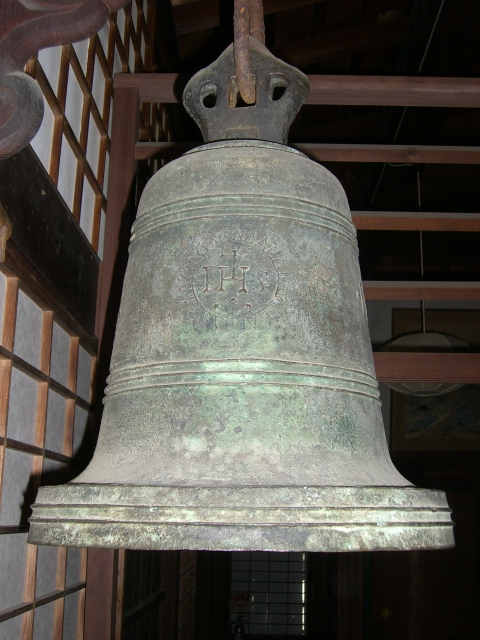
The bell of Nanban-ji

The bell of Nanban-ji is a Jesuit bell made in Portugal in 1577. The bell was used at Nanbanji Church, which was established by Jesuit Father Gnecchi-Soldo Organtino with the support of Oda Nobunaga in 1576. However, the church was destroyed in 1587 because Regent Toyotomi Hideyoshi made the first law against Christians in Japan. The Bell came to Shunkō-in during the Edo period. During World War II, the grandfather of the present vice-abbot buried the bell in the temple gardens to prevent destruction by the state authorities.

== Kirishitan lantern ==
The Edo period (between 1603 and 1867) was the dark age of Japanese Christians. Christianity was banned, and Christians were systematically eliminated by the Tokugawa shogunate, or Edo bakufu. However, some Christians kept their faith and hid their religious identity. Those hidden Christians made their crosses and graves to resemble the Buddhist statues, pagodas, and stone lanterns. Shunkō-in's hidden Christian lantern is one of those religious objects.

== The Garden of Boulders, or Sazareishi-no-niwa ==
The Garden of Boulders, or Sazareishi-no-niwa, is the main garden of Shunkō-in. The theme of the garden is Ise Shrine, or Ise Jingū, in Mie Prefecture. Ise Shrine is the head shrine of all Shinto shrines in Japan. This garden houses a forest to Amaterasu-ōmikami, a sun goddess, and a shrine to Toyouke-no-ōmikami, a goddess of agriculture. It is common to see Buddhist and Shintō objects enshrined at the same place in Japan because until the Meiji period (in the late 19th and early 20th century), it was a popular belief in Japan that Shinto deities are various forms of the Buddha that existed to save people.

== Sliding door panels, or fusuma-e, by Eigaku Kanō ==
Several sliding door panels at Shunkōin were painted by Kanō Eigaku. Some of the paintings have Confucian teachings as their theme. Confucianism was very important to samurai, or warriors, during the Edo period because Confucianism taught samurai about honor, loyalty, and honesty.

== Azaleas of D.T. Suzuki ==
Shunkō-in was one of the most important places in Japanese Buddhist philosophy in the early 20th century. D. T. Suzuki and Shin'ichi Hisamatsu, who are two of the most famous Japanese Zen Buddhist philosophers, discussed the future of Japanese Buddhism at this temple. There are azaleas planted by D.T. Suzuki in the front garden of Shunkō-in.

== LGBT ally ==
Although there is no legal recognition for same-sex marriage in Japan, in June 2011, the deputy head abbot of Kyoto's Shunkō-in Zen temple announced that the temple would perform same-sex marriage ceremonies in the temple as part of Gay and Lesbian Pride Month.
