= 1577 Portuguese voyage to Japan =

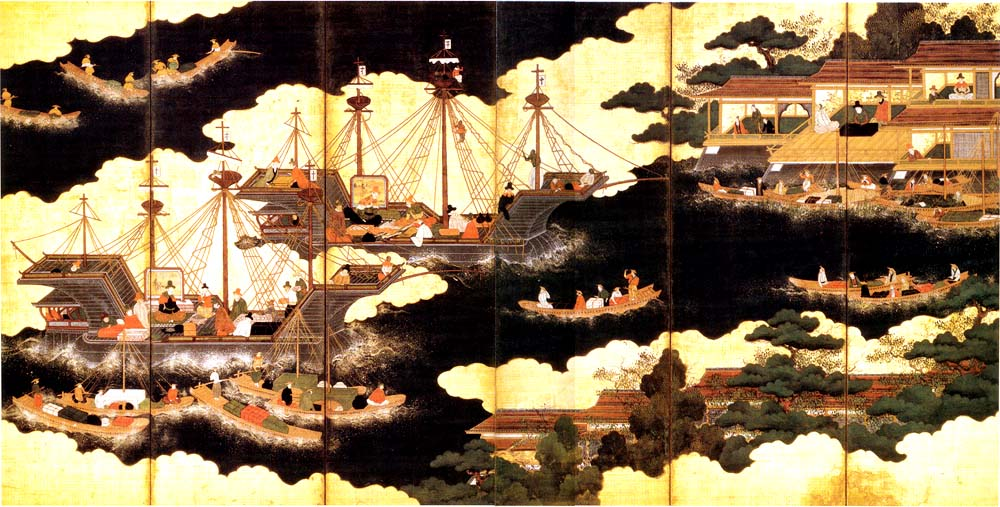
- Nanban ships arriving in Japan, 16th century
Date	1577
Location	Coast of Korea
Result	Portuguese victory

Belligerents
Kingdom of Portugal	Kingdom of Joseon

Commanders and leaders
Domingos Monteiro	Unknown

Strength
1 junk 1 sampan	Numerous Korean boats

Casualties and losses
Unknown number of crew killed	Unknown

The 1577 Portuguese voyage to Japan was a private Portuguese junk voyage to Japan that was blown off course by a typhoon and driven to the coast of Korea, where the damaged vessel was surrounded by many Korean boats. The Koreans attacked the junk's sampan and killed its crew, after which the Portuguese drove them off with firearms before attempting to repair the junk and escape.

Another similar voyage occurred in August 1578, which some regard as the first "documented physical presence of a European off the Korean coast", when a typhoon swept the Portuguese ship San Sebastián toward the Korean coast during its journey from Macau to Nagasaki, with fear of the locals prompting the crew not to land. In contrast, C. R. Boxer links this episode to the previous voyage in 1577. If this is true, then the commander, Domingos Monteiro, would be the first Westerner to have set foot in the country.

We realized that this second land was not the land of Japan as we thought, but Korea… which is inhabited by barbaric and inhuman people, who do not wish to trade with us at any price. And they say that in the past a Portuguese junk desired to land there, but these fierce people took their boat and all who were in it. And they were lucky to get away without being burned alive.

== Bibliography ==
- González Bolado, Jaime (2024). "Discovering Korea through Iberian Writings of the Sixteenth and Seventeenth Centuries" (PDF). European Journal of Korean Studies. 24 (1): 101–124. doi:10.33526/EJKS.20242401.101.
