= Nanban art =

Japanese art genre of the 16th and 17th centuries

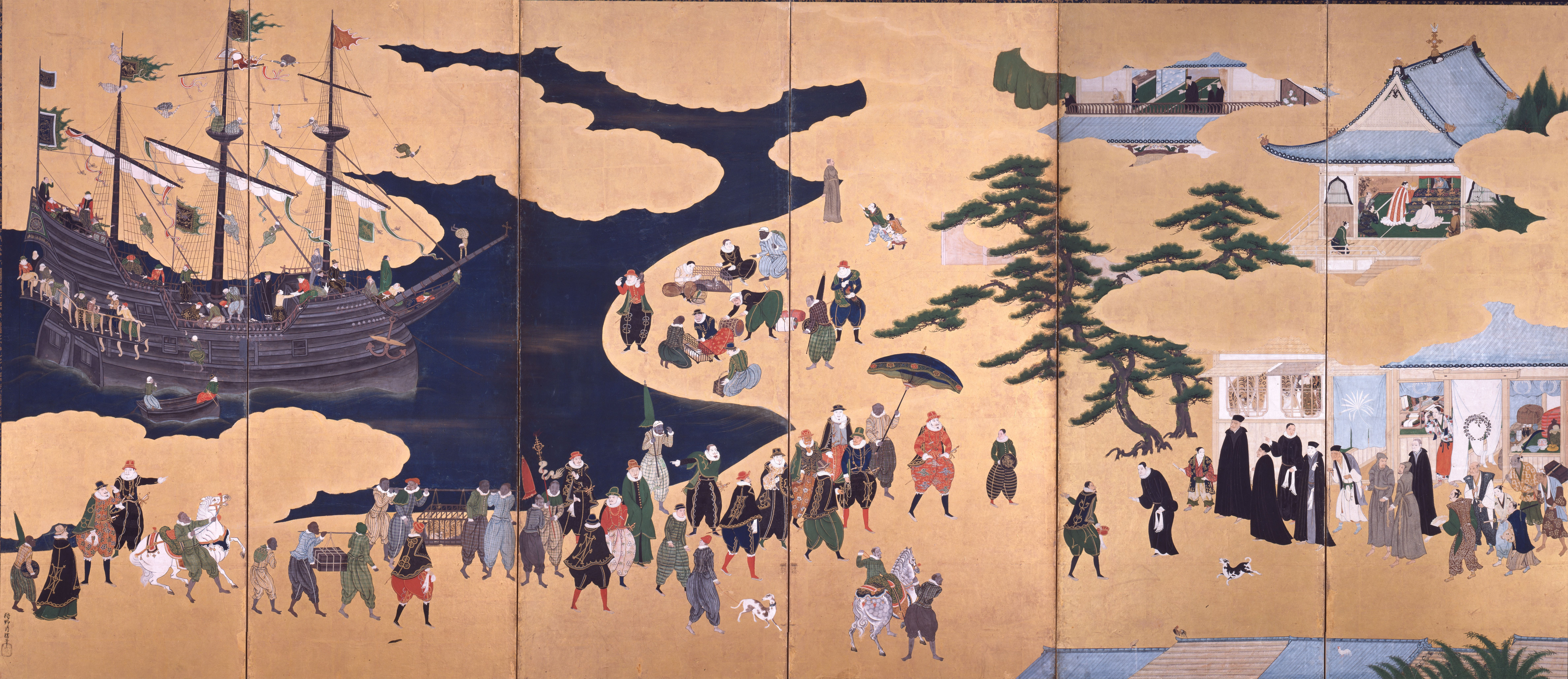
Nanban byōbu of c. 1570-1616 attributed to Kanō Naizen, Kobe City Museum

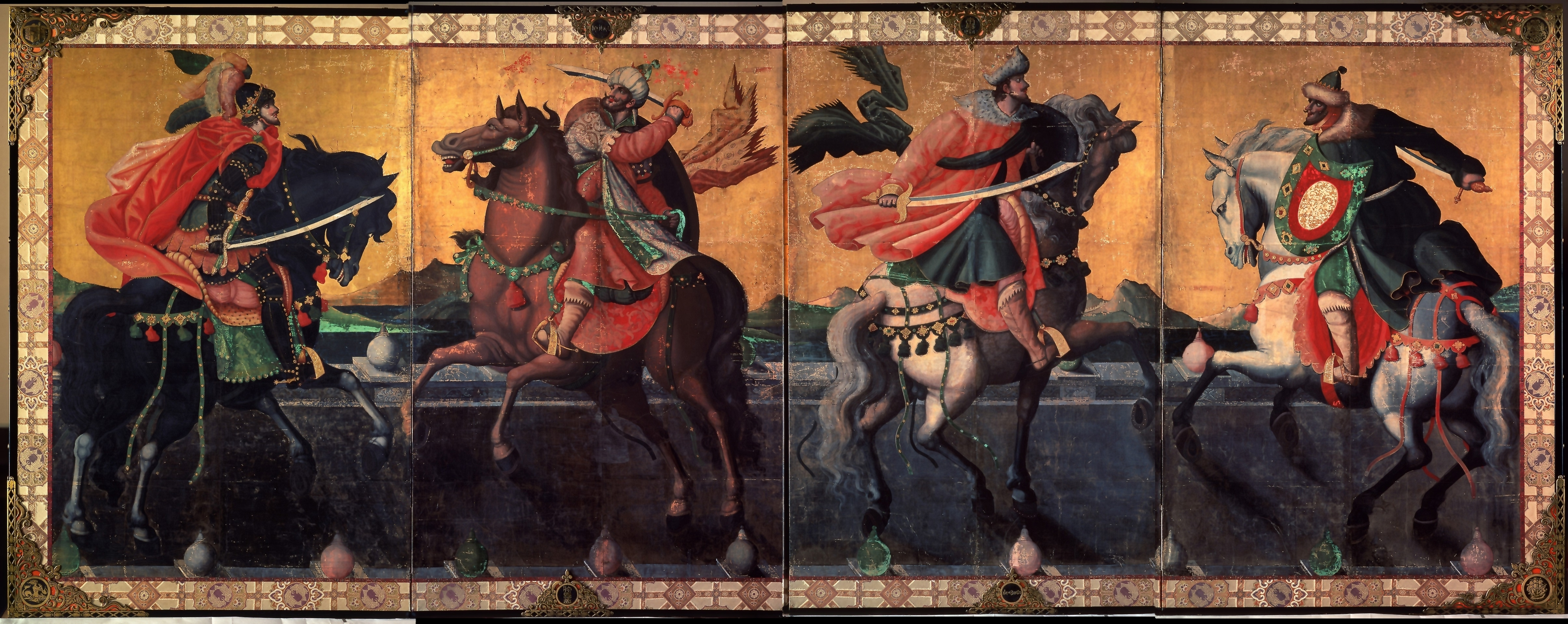
Western Kings on Horseback byōbu of c. 1611-1614, Kobe City Museum. It is a work that fuses Western themes and techniques with Japanese techniques.

A Japanese lacquerware produced and exported at the request of the Society of Jesus. Azuchi–Momoyama period, 16th century, Kyushu National Museum

Nanban art (南蛮美術, Nanban bijutsu) refers to Japanese art of the sixteenth and seventeenth centuries influenced by contact with the Nanban (南蛮) or 'Southern barbarians', traders and missionaries from Europe and specifically from Portugal. It is a Sino-Japanese word, Chinese Nánmán, originally referring to the peoples of South Asia and Southeast Asia. During the Nanban trade period, the word took on a new meaning when it came to designate the Portuguese, who first arrived in 1543, and later other Europeans. The term also refers to paintings which Europeans brought to Japan.

== History ==
Nanban art developed after the first Portuguese ships arrived in Kyushu in 1543. While Christian icons and other objects were produced, Nanban byōbu (南蛮屏風) or folding screens are particularly notable, with over 90 pairs surviving to this day. These vibrant paintings depicted foreigners of all colors arriving in Japanese ports and walking in the streets of Japanese inland towns (see figure 1). Another popular subject within Nanban art was the depiction of foreign warriors. Artists of the Kanō school were joined by those of the Tosa school in combining foreign subject matter with Japanese styles of painting. Canons of western art of the period, such as linear perspective and alternative materials and techniques, appear to have had little lasting influence in Japan. Given the persecution and prohibition of Christianity from the end of the sixteenth century and the Tokugawa policy of sakoku, which largely closed Japan to foreign contact from the 1630s, Nanban art declined.

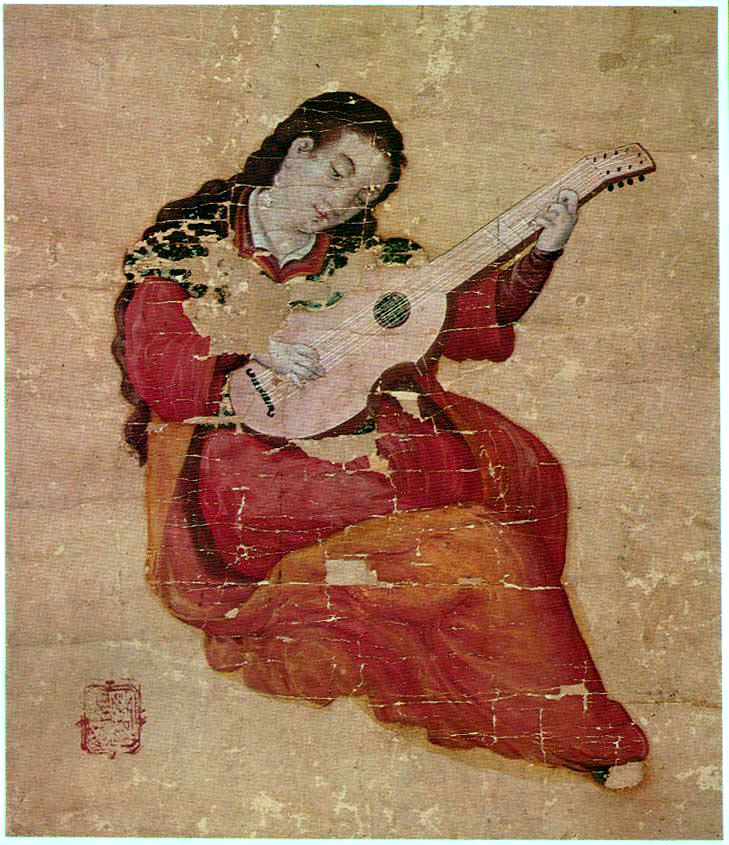
Painting from Momoyama period (1573-1615) by Hasegawa Nobukata of a European woman playing a viola de mano.

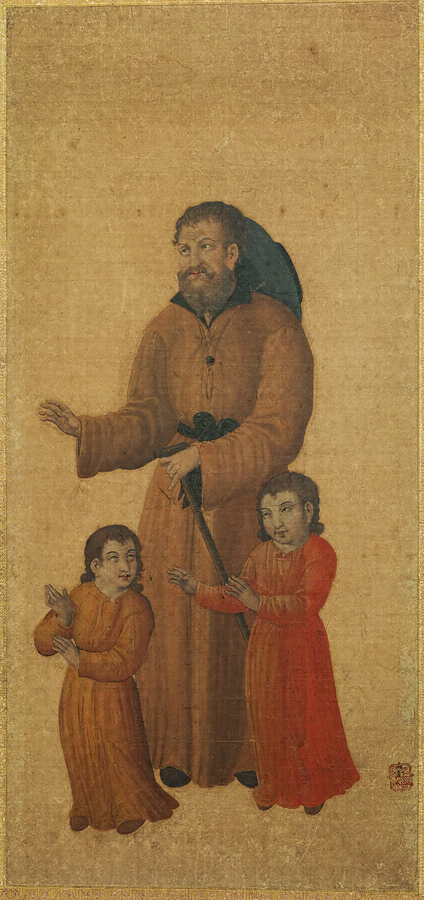
Hasegawa Nobukata painting of a religious man with children. Edo period, early 17th century.

Screen painting of foreign ship and Europeans in Japan.

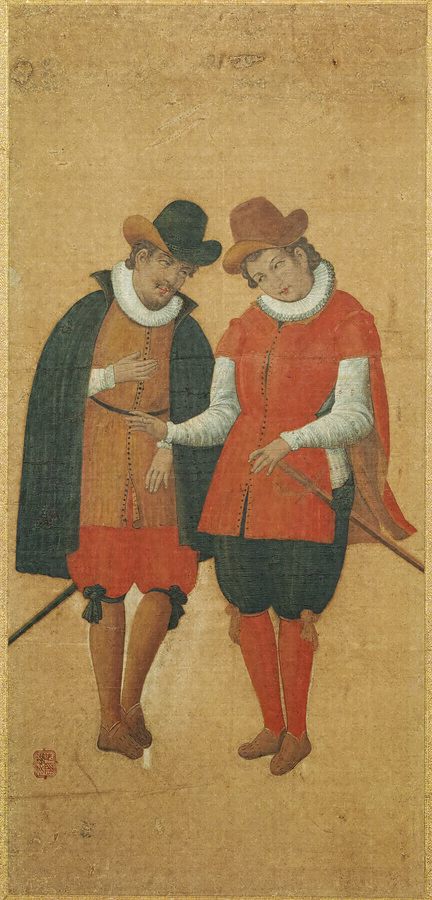
Hasegawa Nobukata painting of two "Western warriors." Edo period, early 17th century.

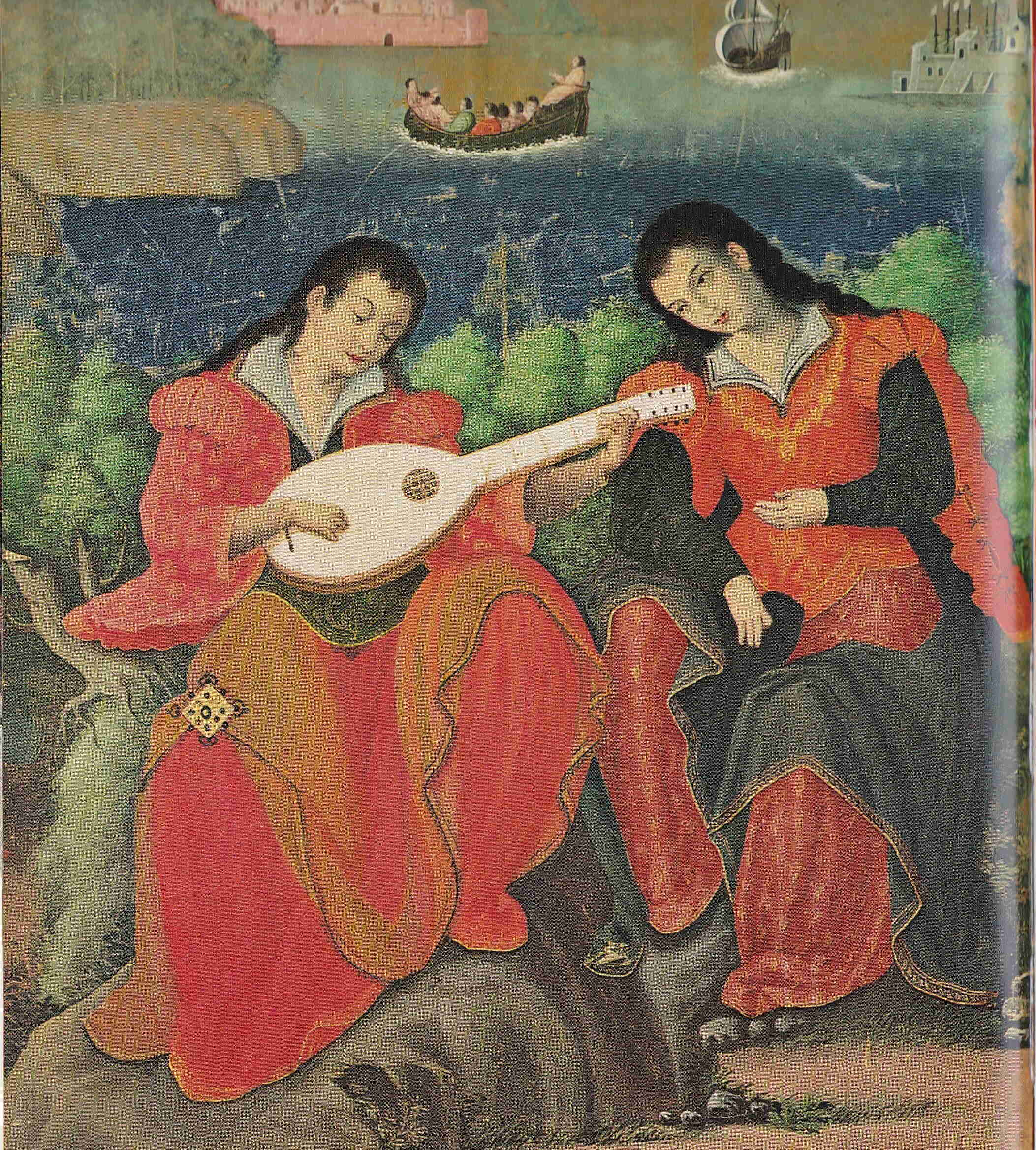
Namban art, screen painting, circa 1600.

== Reverse influence ==
While Japonism did not develop in the west until after the reopening of Japan in the 1850s and the 1860s, there is evidence of earlier Japanese influence in the art of Colonial Mexico. Japanese lacquerware influenced pre-Hispanic lacquerware resulting in Mexican lacquerware or maque, from Japanese makie. This was derived from the trade in Japanese crafts through the Manila Galleons, which traveled between Manila (Philippines) to Acapulco (Mexico) from 1565 to 1815.

== Museums with collections of Nanban art ==
- Kobe City Museum
- Museu Nacional de Arte Antiga
- Museu do Oriente, Lisbon

== See also ==
- Nanban trade
- Kirishitan
- Hasekura Tsunenaga
- List of Japanese words of Portuguese origin
- Yamato-e
- Nanman
