= Kobe City Museum =

Museum in Japan

Coordinates: 34°41′14″N 135°11′35″E

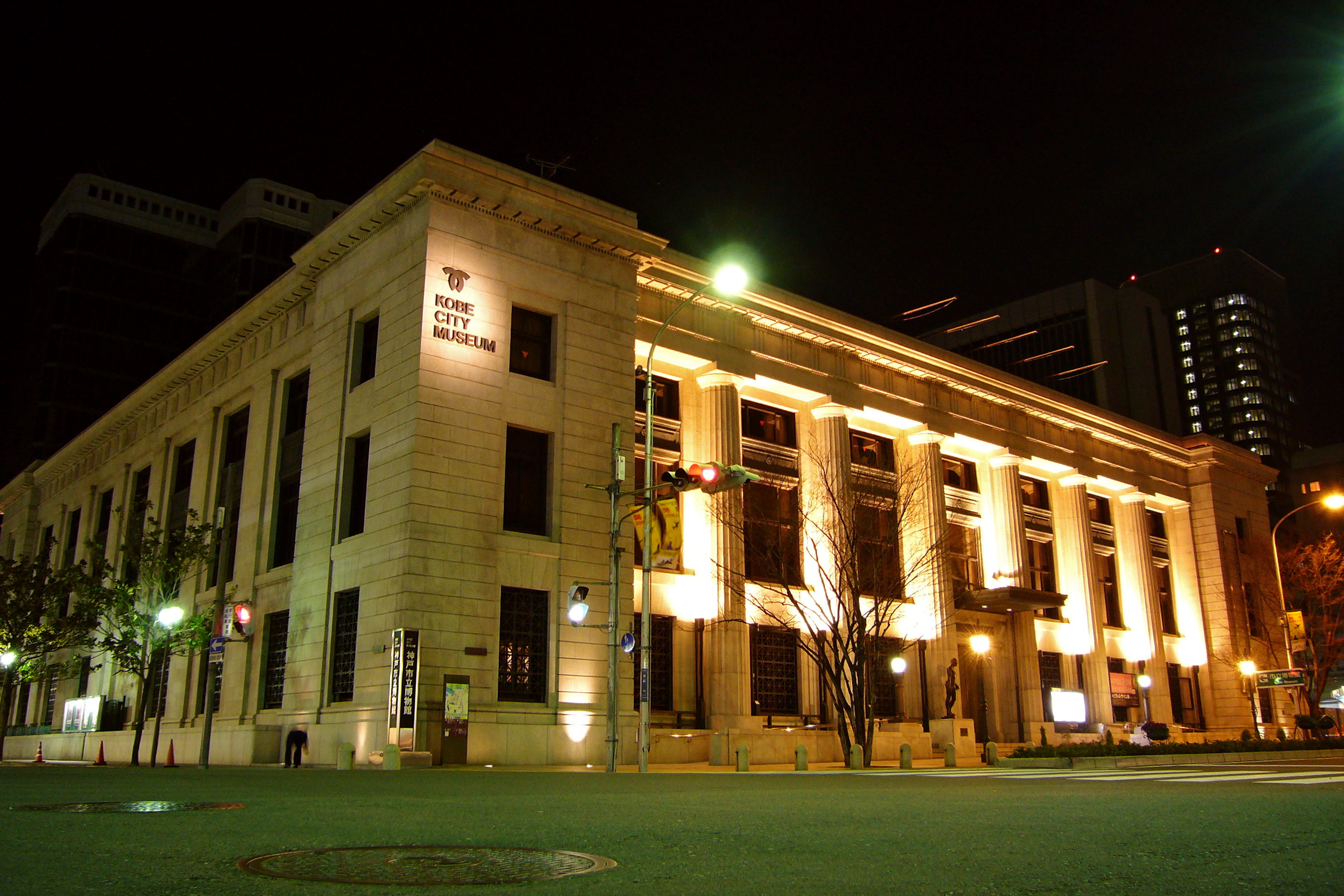
Kobe City Museum, formerly the Kobe branch of the Yokohama Specie Bank (1935)

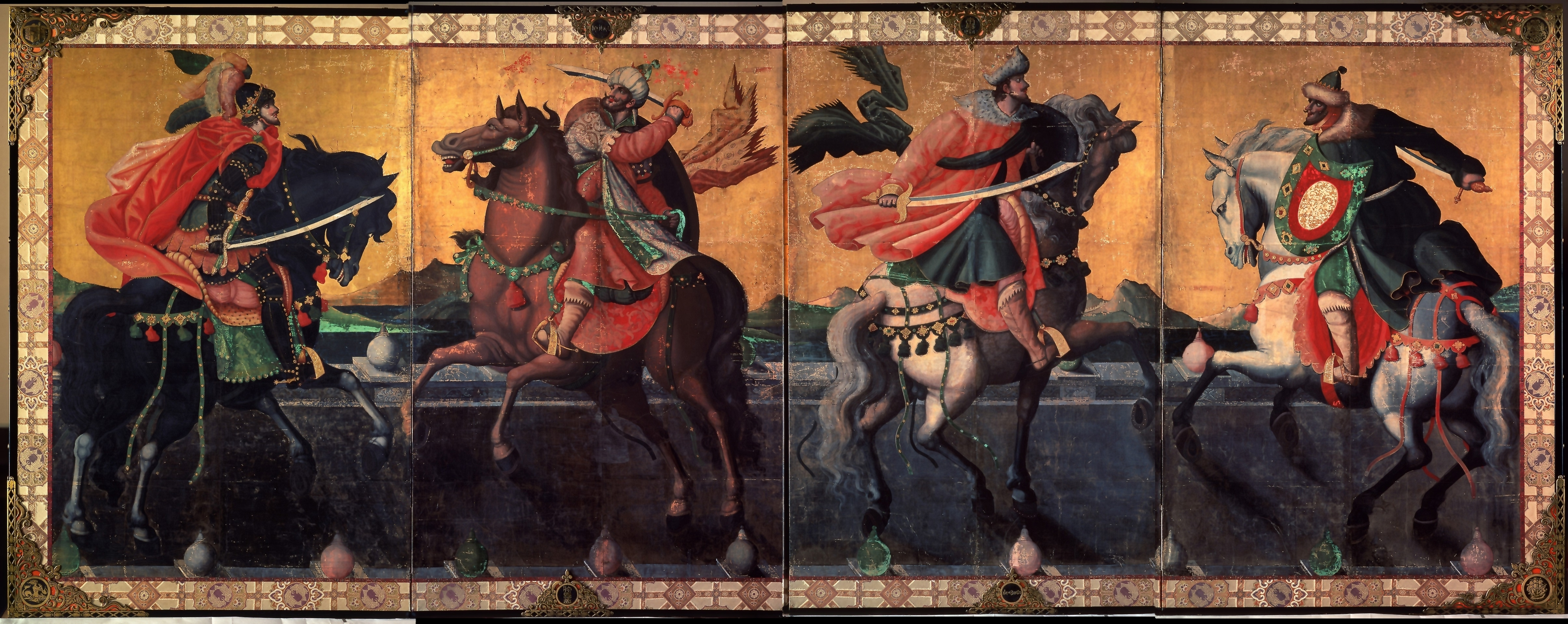
Equestrian kings of Europe; Namban byōbu that forms part of the museum collection

The Kobe City Museum (神戸市立博物館, Kōbe-shiritsu Hakubutsukan) opened in Kobe, Japan in 1982. It is one of Japan's many museums which are supported by a municipality.

The museum resulted from the merger of the Municipal Archaeological Art Museum and Municipal Namban Art Museum. The museum is housed in a neoclassical building built in 1935: the former Kobe branch of the Yokohama Specie Bank. The collection of nearly thirty-nine thousand items comprises archaeological artifacts, works of art, old maps, and historical documents and artifacts relating to Kobe. It includes an important collection of Nanban art (the former Hajime Ikenaga Collection), as well as a set of dōtaku and other items of the Yayoi period from excavations at Sakuragaoka that have been designated a National Treasure.

== See also ==
- Japanese museums
