= Bateren Edict =

1587 Japanese edict

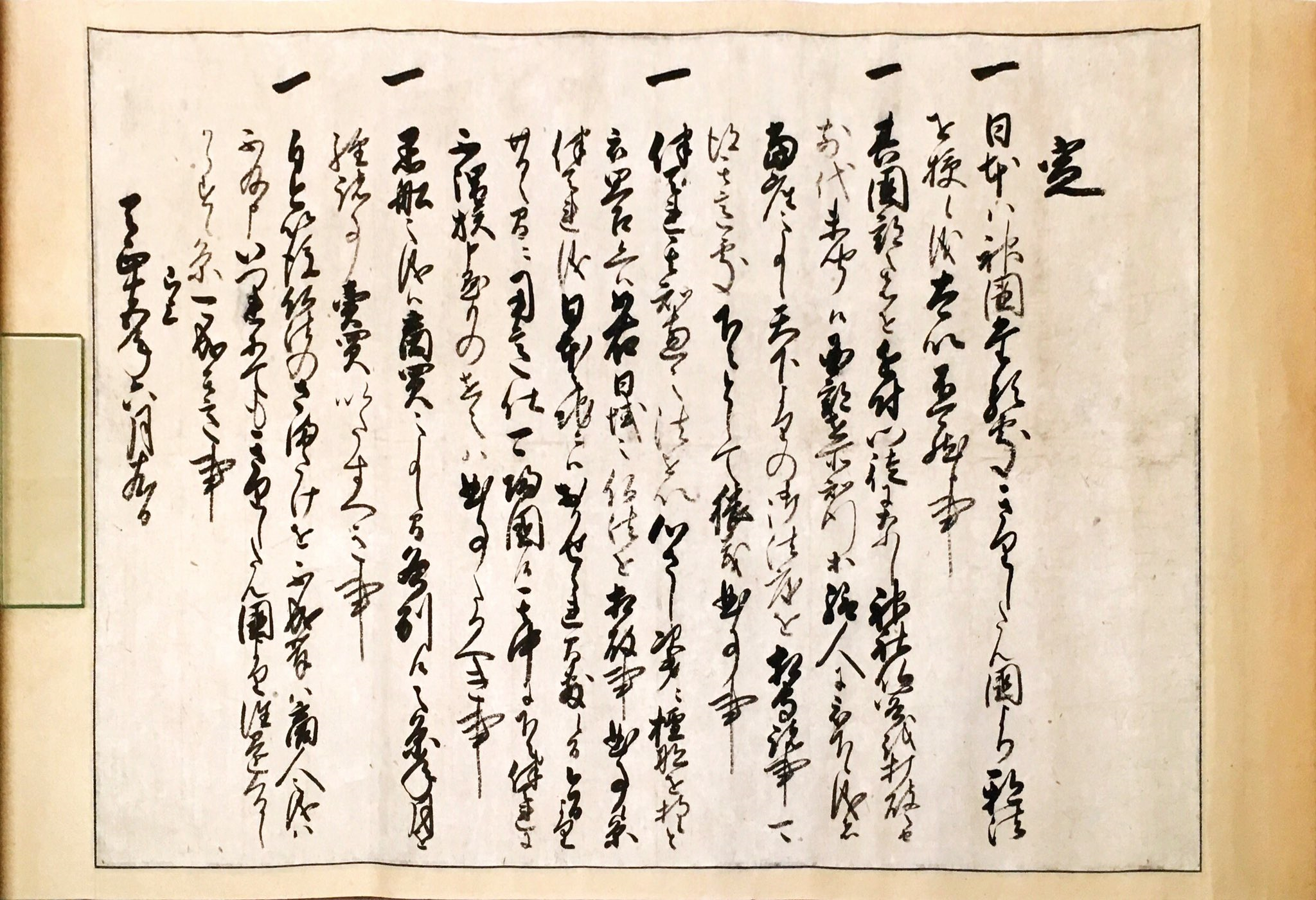
Hideyoshi's Bateren Edict

The Bateren Edict (Bateren Tsuihorei) was issued by Toyotomi Hideyoshi in Chikuzen Hakozaki (currently Higashi-ku, Fukuoka City, Fukuoka Prefecture) on July 24, 1587, regarding Christian missionary activities and Nanban trade. Bateren is derived from the Latin patrem, which means father in the accusative case, or the Portuguese word padre.

The original document is preserved within the 'Matsuura Family Documents' collection, housed at the Matsuura Historical Museum in Hirado City, Nagasaki Prefecture. The term 'Bateren Expulsion Edict,' which refers to an order issued to expel Christian missionaries, generally denotes a five-article document dated July 24, 1587, contained within the 'Matsuura Family Documents' (henceforth referred to as the 'expulsion edict'). However, it may also encompass an eleven-article memorandum, dated June 23, 1587, discovered in 1933 within the 'Goshuin Shishiki Kokaku,' an archival collection at the Jingu Library of Ise Jingu, necessitating careful distinction. This memorandum is referred to as either 'oboe' or 'kakusho' in historical records. Since the discovery of the eleven-article memorandum, extensive scholarly discussions have addressed the reasons for its discrepancies with the five-article expulsion edict and the interpretive significance of both documents.

== Background ==
=== Jesuit missions and leaders in Japan ===
Francisco Xavier (1549–1551), the mission's founder, introduced Christianity in Kyushu, establishing its foundation. Cosme de Torres (1551–1570) led as de facto Superior, expanding the mission until his death. Francisco Cabral (1570–1581), as Superior, enforced rigid policies, causing cultural friction, and was dismissed by Alessandro Valignano in 1581. Gaspar Coelho (1581–1590) succeeded Cabral as Superior, managing relations with Japanese authorities until his death. Alessandro Valignano (1573–1606), appointed Visitor of the East Indies in 1573, held supreme authority over East Asia's Jesuit missions, until his death in 1606. Visiting Japan three times (1579–1583, 1590–1592, 1598–1603), he championed cultural adaptation and founded St. Paul's College in Macao (1594) to train Japanese clergy. (Note: His authority as Visitor, outranking Superiors, was evident in his dismissal of Cabral.)

=== Nagasaki's formation and Christian settlement ===
Nagasaki's development as a significant port city in Japan was closely tied to the arrival of Christianity and Portuguese trade. Initially an unpopulated promontory covered with wild thickets, Nagasaki was selected around 1570 by Jesuit missionaries, with the support of the Christian daimyo Ōmura Sumitada (Don Bartolomeu), for its natural advantages as a port, including a narrow promontory that provided visual defense of the bay entrance. Sumitada, the first Japanese daimyo to convert to Catholicism, invited Jesuits to settle in Yokoseura in the early 1560s, where a church was built, and Portuguese ships visited in 1562 and 1563. However, Yokoseura was destroyed in 1563 by anti-Christian groups and jealous merchants, prompting the Jesuits to seek a new location. Nagasaki was chosen, and Sumitada offered to donate the land to the Jesuits to establish a settlement for displaced Christians, many of whom were exiles from other regions due to religious persecution or wars, granting perpetual usage rights and extraterritorial privileges in return for securing permanent port customs and entry taxes, with designated officials stationed to oversee their collection.

By 1579, Nagasaki had grown from a village of 400 houses to a town of 5,000 by 1590, and 15,000 by the early 17th century, becoming a hub for Portuguese trade and Catholic activity, with multiple parishes established to meet spiritual needs. The Jesuits, led by Valignano, accepted Ōmura's donation to establish a secure base for their mission and facilitate Portuguese trade. Valignano saw Nagasaki's strategic value for supporting displaced Christians and funding missionary activities. The donation was accepted conditionally, allowing the Jesuits to withdraw if needed, reflecting caution due to Japan's political instability and the non-binding nature of Japanese donations, which could be revoked by lords or their successors.

In 1582, Gaspar Coelho, upon his appointment as the Superior of the Jesuit mission in Japan, promptly initiated the construction of fusta ships. The funding for this endeavor was reportedly secured from Portuguese merchants residing in Nagasaki, primarily allocated to the construction of vessels equipped for towing, intended for the towing of carrack ships upon their arrival. Furthermore, the fusta vessels are presumed to have also functioned as a means of transporting fresh supplies, such as water, food, and firewood, to Nagasaki. As a consequence of the destruction of Christian refugee homes and a monastery in Yokoseura by anti-Christian forces in 1563, the Jesuits were compelled to relocate to Nagasaki. Following this relocation, it is posited that, in order to strengthen the defenses of the trading port, the Jesuits assigned fusta ships the task of patrolling Nagasaki Bay and the outer coastal regions of the Nagasaki Peninsula. (Note: Fernandes is recorded as the individual who served as the captain of fusta ships, tasked with safeguarding the city and port of Nagasaki. In 1570, he arrived in India as a soldier, where he was captured and held as a prisoner by Arabs before serving as a secretary to a wealthy merchant in Goa. Several years later, with his master's permission, he relocated to Macao, where he engaged in voyages across East Asia under the employ of another Portuguese merchant. During his second voyage to Japan, Fernandes, encountering a storm, vowed to join the Jesuit order in exchange for his survival, and was formally admitted by Cabral in January 1579.)

The Nagasaki Misericórdia (almshouse) was formally instituted in 1583 through the election of officers and the establishment of a hospital. This charitable institution managed a secondary facility outside the city for leprosy patients, underscoring the profound impact of Christian practices in a Japan that lacked hospitals prior to Portuguese arrival. Jesuit Luis Fróis recorded that this facility served individuals considered “repugnant” by Japanese society. This endeavor exemplified the innovative introduction of Christian charitable principles, offering a novel framework for Japanese social welfare. Moreover, the establishment of an almshouse in Hirado as early as 1561, with officers actively collecting donations, attests to the early adoption of the Misericórdia system across Japan and the deep integration of Christian charitable ideals into local communities.

Through their operation of hospitals for the poor and critically ill, the Jesuit order deepened engagement with marginalized communities, resulting in their categorization as impure. Historian George Ellison observes that, despite being driven by profound compassion, the missionaries’ actions yielded unintended social consequences. While these hospitals gained favor among the destitute, the elite distanced themselves from the missionaries, citing fears of "contamination". This concept of "contamination" was less about physical disease transmission and more about anxieties over social and symbolic impurity associated with the missionaries. In environments frequented by leprosy or scurvy patients, Jesuit missionaries were perceived as vectors of impurity, risking their portrayal as tainted entities or sources of defilement in the eyes of aristocratic patrons. Consequently, they faced the danger of being situated as loci of impurity. In Japanese history, the purity-impurity dichotomy has recurrently served as a logic of domination rooted in hierarchical structures. Though its specific manifestations shift across time and context, this binary consistently sustains mechanisms of control and exclusion. Unwittingly, the Jesuits positioned themselves within the subordinate domain of impurity.

=== Slavery in 16th century Japan and Jesuit responses ===
In 16th century Japan, economic pressures and cultural practices led to widespread servitude resembling slavery. Parents, facing taxes from non-Christian lords, sold children into servitude under "great" rather than "extreme" necessity. Japanese lords wielded power akin to Roman vitae necisque potestas, treating peasants and servants as near-slaves, often using them as tax guarantors. Daimyos and merchants sold war captives, especially women and children, into slavery, with Portuguese and Japanese sources documenting brutalities in conflicts like the 1553 Battle of Kawanakajima and 1578 Shimazu campaigns. The inter-Asian slave trade, including wokou piracy, exacerbated suffering, with reports of Chinese slaves treated like cattle in Satsuma, a fate shared by many Japanese. The geninka system (Note: Genin (下人) were low-status, often hereditary servants in medieval Japan, employed in agricultural or household labor. Known as fudai no genin (譜代の下人, hereditary servants) or similar terms, they were subject to customary practices allowing their sale.) formalized servitude, involving children sold by parents, self-sold individuals, debt-bound workers, and those punished for crimes or rebellion including their wives and children. Women fleeing abuse could be forced into genin status, and lords demanded retainers' daughters serve as genin. Famine and disasters drove people to offer themselves as genin for survival, with the status often becoming hereditary, perpetuating bondage across generations.

The Portuguese engaged in the slave trade in Japan, particularly in Kyushu, where political disunity and economic incentives facilitated the practice. Japanese slaves, often acquired through war, kidnapping, or voluntary servitude due to poverty, were sold to Portuguese merchants and transported to places like Macau, Goa, and even Portugal. Some Japanese chose servitude to travel to Macau or due to poverty, but many indentured servants in Macau broke contracts by fleeing to Ming territory, reducing Portuguese slave purchases. Poverty, driven by lords' tax demands, led some to view slavery as a survival strategy, with peasants offering themselves or others as collateral for unpaid taxes, blurring the line between farmers and slaves.

==== Jesuit reforms and humanitarian compromises ====
The 1567 Goa Council advised missionaries to recommend the release of Japanese servants (下人) once their labor matched the compensation provided, particularly during famines or disasters when individuals offered labor for protection. The Council allowed Christians to ransom criminals sentenced to death unjustly, with the rescued serving as servants in return, since no one could be forced to provide funds without compensation. Jesuits also advised against enslaving the wives and children of punished criminals and supported freeing women who sought refuge from abusive fathers or husbands, except in cases of serious crimes, despite Japanese customs permitting their enslavement.

Valignano, the Jesuit Visitor, consistently highlighted the Japanese Jesuits’ lack of authority and power to suppress the slave trade. In Portuguese India, Valignano and fellow Jesuits lacked jurisdiction to intervene in slave transactions, which were subject to secular courts. Priests were limited to providing ethical guidance, rendering the cessation of the practice unfeasible, and it persisted into the seventeenth century. In Japan, the Macao Diocese, established in 1568, oversaw Japan from 1576, but the absence of a resident bishop impeded the resolution of local issues. The Jesuits’ attempt to establish an independent diocese required explicit approval from Rome.

Given the limited impact of admonitions and recommendations, missionaries sought to navigate local social dynamics within the constraints of ecclesiastical law. They categorized labor into three forms: servitude equivalent to slavery, a tolerable non-slavery condition, and an unacceptable state. This distinction is believed to have led missionaries to reluctantly acquiesce to local customs. Furthermore, missionaries critical of the Portuguese slave trade in Japan, unable to directly prevent Portuguese merchants’ slave purchases due to insufficient authority, advocated for reframing Japan’s prevalent perpetual human trafficking as a form of indentured servitude (yearly contract labor) to align with local practices while mitigating the harshest aspects of exploitation.

Recognizing their limited power, the Jesuits sought to reform Japan's system of perpetual slavery (永代人身売買) into indentured servitude (年季奉公). Some missionaries, driven by humanitarian concerns, signed short-term ownership certificates (schedulae) to prevent the greater harm of lifelong enslavement. This pragmatic approach, however, was controversial. By 1598, missionary participation in such practices was banned. Critics like Mateus de Couros condemned any involvement, even if motivated by compassion, highlighting the moral complexities of the Jesuits' position. The practice of issuing permits for temporary servitude in Japan, recognized as early as 1568 with Melchior Carneiro's arrival in Macao, gained official or local acknowledgment. The intervention of missionaries in Japan, particularly in issuing short-term permits, likely peaked between 1568 and the period following the 1587 Bateren expulsion edict, when permit issuance requirements became stricter or were increasingly restrained.

Jesuit-established organizations, such as confraternities and the Nagasaki Misericórdia (almshouse), undertook efforts to rescue Japanese slaves, particularly women, from ships and brothels. The memoirs of Afonso de Lucena and letters of Luis Fróis concur regarding the treatment of captives during the Battle of Nagayo Castle in March 1587, reflecting Lucena’s concerns about their legitimacy. After Christmas 1586, Lucena urged Ōmura Sumitada, whose health was failing, to free unjustly held captives, leveraging the threat of withholding confession. The Jesuits strategically withheld confession or sacraments to compel moral conduct, especially among influential converts.

Moreover, bishops and their representatives condemned brothels and private prostitution as “workshops of the devil.” The fourth article of the Constitutions of Goa (1568) prohibited brothel ownership and operation, imposing fines and public shaming on violators, while mandating the liberation of slaves coerced into prostitution.

==== Navigating moral ideals amid practical constraints ====
In 1537, Pope Paul III's Sublimis Deus prohibited enslaving American indigenous peoples and future unknown or pagan populations. The 1542 New Laws of the Indies extended this to East Asians, legally classified as "Indians." In 1555, Portuguese merchants began enslaving Japanese individuals, prompting the Jesuit order to advocate for its cessation. Their efforts led to King Sebastian I of Portugal issuing a decree in 1571 banning the Japanese slave trade. However, enforcement was weak, and the trade persisted. During the transition from the 16th to the 17th century, under the Iberian Union, King Philip II (and later Philip III of Spain) reissued the 1571 decree at the Jesuits' urging. Despite these royal mandates, local Portuguese elites fiercely opposed the bans, rendering them ineffective.

The Jesuits, previously constrained by limited authority in Japan, experienced a pivotal shift with Pedro Martins’ consecration as bishop in 1592 (Note: Pedro Martins is considered to be the first bishop to reside in Japan. Sebastian de Morais was appointed as the first bishop of the Funai Diocese in 1588, but he died of illness during his voyage to Japan.) and his arrival in Nagasaki in 1596. As the first high-ranking cleric in Japan since Francisco Xavier, Martins acquired the authority to excommunicate Portuguese merchants engaged in the trade of Japanese and Korean slaves. However, the Jesuits’ dependence on financial support from the Captain-major and the bishop’s limited secular authority posed challenges. The Captain-major, as the supreme representative of Portuguese royal authority in Japan, held significant power; opposing him without royal endorsement made excommunication theoretically feasible but practically uncertain. Ultimately, Martins, alarmed by the social disruption caused by the trade in Japanese and Korean slaves, resolved to pronounce excommunication against human trafficking. After his death, Bishop Cerqueira reinforced this anti-slavery policy, referring the issue, which required secular authority, to the Portuguese crown.

The Jesuits' efforts to combat the Japanese slave trade reflect a struggle between moral conviction and practical limitations. Despite securing royal decrees and attempting reforms, they faced resistance from Portuguese elites and the realities of Japan's socio-political context.

=== Hideyoshi's foreign invasion plans ===
Toyotomi Hideyoshi, after consolidating power in Japan by 1585, harbored ambitions to expand Japanese influence abroad. In 1585, as Kampaku, Hideyoshi articulated ambitions to invade China to address resource shortages, later expanding to Korea, the Philippines, India. He claimed divine legitimacy, asserting that his mother dreamt she carried the Sun in her womb when he was born, an auspicious sign that he would "radiate virtue and rule the four seas"(Zoku Zenrin Kokuhoki). Hideyoshi's vision included relocating the Japanese emperor to Beijing, appointing his nephew as regent of China, and establishing himself in Ningbo to oversee further conquests, including India, and Europe. These plans were driven by a desire for economic gain, territorial expansion, and recognition from foreign rulers, rather than purely military motives. The 1592 invasion of Korea, involving over 160,000 troops, was a step toward this goal but ultimately failed after six years, ending with Hideyoshi's death in 1598.

Fears of a Japanese invasion of the Philippines were recorded as early as 1586, with Spanish authorities in Manila noting Japanese espionage activities and preparing defenses against potential attacks. Toyotomi Hideyoshi's 1586 request to Gaspar Coelho for Portuguese warships to aid his planned invasion of Ming China signaled his expansionist ambitions. The Spanish, aware of these plans, grew wary of Japanese activities in the vulnerable Philippines colony, leading to a 1586 Manila council memorial documenting concerns about Japanese colonization and prompting defensive measures.

=== Jesuit stance on iconoclasm ===
The Jesuits, led by figures like Francisco Cabral and Alessandro Valignano, officially opposed the destruction of Buddhist temples and Shinto shrines by Christian converts, viewing such acts as counterproductive to their mission. However, zealous converts, particularly in agricultural and fishing communities, begain to see traditional institutions as complicit in feudal oppression. This led to violent iconoclasm in regions like Nagasaki and Kumamoto, where temples and shrines were burned. The Jesuits aimed to convert the ruling class first, but the fervor of lower-class converts often spilled into destructive acts, complicating the mission's relationship with Japanese authorities. Historians like Andre C. Ross note uncertainty about direct responsibility, but Jesuit leaders Francisco Cabral and Valignano opposed such violence, advocating accommodation with Japanese customs to sustain the mission.

Luís Fróis's História de Japam, over-relied upon as a key source on Christian iconoclasm (e.g., temple destruction) due to the scarcity of contemporary Japanese records, is unreliable, often compressing events across years into brief accounts, making contemporary missionary letters more trustworthy. These letters reveal the establishment of the Todos-os-Santos Church in 1569, built by Jesuit priest Gaspar Vilela using materials from a dismantled Buddhist temple (Note: The family temple(菩提寺) of Nagasaki clan.) donated by Nagasaki Jinzaemon Sumikage. This act symbolized the Christian mission's impact on local religious landscapes, with reports of other religious sites destroyed, possibly small prayer spaces in fishing villages. (Note: As missionary records do not mention the shrines in Nagasaki noted in Japanese sources, those shrines could have been abandoned or deteriorated due to natural exposure before the port town's establishment.) The motives—whether missionary zeal, actions by Christian converts fleeing persecution, or wartime strategies by daimyo—remain debated due to scarce corroborating evidence. Japanese and Western records diverge in their accounts: missionary letters focus on Christian activities but omit local perspectives, while Japanese sources, written during the anti-Christian Tokugawa period, lack reliability due to bias and temporal distance. The daimyo, like Ōmura Sumitada, who sheltered Christians in 1569, often navigated a dual identity as both Christians and Buddhists, reflecting a pluralist flexibility. For instance, evidence suggests a daimyo took the tonsure in Shingon Buddhism around 1574, highlighting the coexistence of faiths.

Many temples and shrines maintain traditions, compiled much later, claiming destruction by a Christian daimyo during the Tenshō era. However, primary sources from before the Tenshō period, intact Buddhist statues, and on-site investigations reveal no evidence of such destruction in many cases. Scholars suggest these incidents likely resulted from negotiations. Contemporary records, including letters securing temple lands, indicate that Sengoku-era Christian daimyo prioritized strategic alliances, protecting influential temples and villages to enhance their authority, with religious considerations being of minor importance.

=== Church acquisition ===
Churches were acquired through donations or purchases, often facilitated by Christian daimyo like Ōmura Sumitada. Many temples, weakened by the Sengoku period's instability and Oda Nobunaga's attacks on religious institutions (e.g., the 1571 burning of Enryakuji), were sold by Buddhist monks to missionaries for survival.

Jesuit missionaries, with the support of local lords, repurposed non-sacred and abandoned spaces for Christian worship. In 1555, Ōtomo Sōrin in Funai, Bungo, donated a field for a house with an integrated chapel and funded a large estate for a new church. In 1576, Arima Yoshisada provided a non-Christian temple, reused as a church without modifications. Churches were also established within castles, such as Ichiki Tsurumaru in Satsuma and Sawa in Yamato (modern Nara), linked to Takayama Tomoteru. Many reused Buddhist temples were abandoned due to the Sengoku period's instability. Local authorities' permission and donations from Christian daimyo and Portuguese traders were critical for acquiring these sites.

During Alessandro Valignano's time, most Catholic construction projects in Japan were managed by Japanese lords, who played a key role in expanding building efforts. Valignano, in his instructions, advocated for respecting local architectural traditions and consulting native master builders. This adaptability allowed Japanese builders to maintain their organization, resources, and construction techniques across the first and second stages of evangelization.

=== Religious nativism ===
Social perceptions of missionaries in Japan were marked by defamatory rumors, notably claims that they consumed human flesh. Fernão Guerreiro's Jesuit Annual Report documents persistent harassment, including acts like throwing corpses at priests' doorways to convince the ignorant that missionaries ate human flesh, fostering hatred and disgust. Rumors also circulated that missionaries came to eat children, extracted eyeballs for sorcery. Similar slanders, such as claims in Ōmura Yoshimi's Kyushu Godōzaki that missionaries skinned and ate livestock alive, reflected a broader mystical belief that foreigners, especially missionaries, brought death and destruction. Historian Akio Okada attributes these ideas to xenophobic fears of foreigners and pagans, viewing their presence as inherently tied to ruin.

In 1553, rumors of missionary cannibalism emerged in Bungo. Ōtomo Sōrin, a local lord, issued an edict to stop people from throwing stones at missionary houses. In 1563, Ōmura Sumitada became Japan's first Christian daimyō, adopting the baptismal name Dom Bartolomeu. His conversion provoked strong opposition, as Buddhist monks incited a rebellion that led to the burning of the monastery and Christian farmers' homes at Yokoseura Port, reducing much of the port to ashes. In a letter dated October 14, 1564, Luis de Almeida, Japan's first Western surgeon and missionary, reported that Arima Haruzumi ordered the destruction of Christian crosses in his domain and mandated that Christians revert to their former beliefs. In 1573, Fukahori Sumikata further intensified the persecution by burning down the Todos os Santos Church.

== Events leading to the Jesuit expulsion ==
In 1586, Gaspar Coelho, Vice-Provincial of the Jesuit Order, departed Nagasaki on March 6 and arrived in Sakai around April 25 after approximately fifty days of travel. Upon arrival, Coelho ignored an envoy from Satsuma, who likely sought to enforce existing directives compelling his return to Nagasaki. Instead, he allied with Ōtomo Sōrin, who requested military support from Toyotomi Hideyoshi against the Shimazu and Ryūzōji clans. This strategic decision to evade Satsuma’s influence entailed considerable risks: a Shimazu victory could have led to Coelho’s execution and the expulsion of the Jesuits from Kyushu.

On May 4, 1586, Coelho met Toyotomi Hideyoshi at Osaka Castle, accompanied by over thirty Jesuit priests and attendants. The meeting initially proceeded cordially, with Hideyoshi seated approximately one meter from Coelho and his interpreter, Luís Fróis. Hideyoshi commended the Jesuits’ dedication to propagating their doctrine, though this praise may have implicitly cautioned against involvement in secular matters. He outlined his political ambitions: unifying Japan, establishing enduring peace, delegating governance to his brother, Toyotomi Hidenaga, and pursuing the conquest of Korea and China. To support these objectives, Hideyoshi requested Jesuit assistance in procuring two armed carrack ships, offering payment in silver and promising land and income for Portuguese crew members. In exchange, he pledged to permit church construction in conquered Chinese territories, mandate conversions to Christianity, and promote widespread conversions in Japan. Additionally, he suggested ceding Hizen Province in Kyushu to Kirishitan daimyo, such as Takayama Ukon and Konishi Yukinaga, while assuring that Nagasaki would be entrusted to the Church.

Eager to gain Hideyoshi’s favor, Coelho abandoned the Jesuits’ traditional prudence, imprudently committing to provide the requested ships and additional Portuguese military support—promises he lacked the authority or resources to fulfill. More critically, Coelho, unprompted, pledged to mobilize Kyushu’s Kirishitan daimyo to counter Shimazu influence, a political intervention that explicitly contravened the Jesuit leadership’s prohibition against regional political involvement. His failure to secure the promised warships may have fostered Hideyoshi’s distrust.

On July 15, 1587, Toyotomi Hideyoshi inspected an armed ship (fusta) constructed by Jesuit Vice-Provincial Gaspar Coelho at his request in Hakata and demanded its presentation. Having granted land revenue rights to the Jesuits and Christian daimyo, Hideyoshi imposed on the Jesuits the obligation to accept his judicial authority. Consequently, Konishi Yukinaga and Kuroda Yoshitaka advised compliance, but Coelho refused. Additionally, Hideyoshi ordered Portuguese ships anchored in Hirado to relocate to Hakata, a demand rejected on July 24 by Portuguese captain Domingos Monteiro, who cited the port’s unsuitability.

These refusals were perceived as affronts to Hideyoshi’s authority, intensifying his discontent. This dissatisfaction, fueled by the counsel of his physician, Seyakuin Zenshu, prompted decisive action. Motivated by personal animosity toward Takayama Ukon for a prior slight, Seyakuin urged Hideyoshi to test Ukon’s loyalty and escalate pressure on the Jesuits and Christians. Addressing Ukon, Hideyoshi positioned himself as the protector of the Emperor and the imperial court, signaling a deliberate plan to expel the Jesuits . On July 22, one week after Hideyoshi’s visit, Takayama Ukon visited the fusta ship and warned Coelho directly, expressing certainty that a grave calamity threatened the Church in Japan.

=== Hideyoshi’s three questions and proposals ===
On the night of July 24, Hideyoshi dispatched a messenger to Coelho with three questions and proposals, articulating his suspicions about Christian activities. Historians interpret these as the “three proposals,” reflecting Hideyoshi’s economic and political concerns:

- Why do missionaries actively promote conversions in Japan and relocate populations to other regions? Should they not preach in temples like other sectarian monks? (Proposal: Restrict proselytization to Kyushu temples or return to Macao. If the latter, churches in Kyoto, Osaka, and Sakai will be confiscated, with 10,000 koku of rice offered as compensation) .
- Why do they consume cows and horses, critical resources for agriculture and warfare? (Proposal: Cease consumption of cows and horses, with wild game provided as a substitute) .
- Why do Portuguese, Siamese, and Cambodians purchase Japanese slaves and export them? (Proposal: Return slaves; if distant repatriations are infeasible, liberate them immediately and compensate for the silver paid).

On July 25, the messenger posed an additional question about the destruction of temples and shrines and the persecution of monks, underscoring Hideyoshi’s broader distrust of Jesuit activities.

=== Coelho’s responses ===
Unable to engage directly with Hideyoshi and wary of the messenger’s potential to misrelay responses due to fear of Hideyoshi’s wrath, as well as skepticism about Hideyoshi’s reliability, Coelho provided concise replies. According to Luís Fróis, the Jesuits distrusted Hideyoshi’s proposals and opted for succinct answers to mitigate risks of miscommunication. While pragmatic, this brevity may have been perceived as inadequate. The responses from July 24–25 are detailed below:

- Conversion Methods: Missionaries aim to save souls through peaceful persuasion, not coercion. As Christianity is new in Japan, foreign missionaries must travel to proselytize, unlike temple-bound monks of other sects. Hideyoshi’s proposal would curtail the Jesuits’ mission, necessitating continued itinerant preaching.
- Consumption of Cows and Horses: Missionaries and Portuguese do not eat horse meat. Beef consumption reflects European dietary norms but is adapted to Japanese cuisine outside Kyushu. Portuguese merchants may consume meat upon arrival, but this can cease at Hideyoshi’s request. The Jesuits lack authority over Japanese meat vendors but pledged to relay Hideyoshi’s concerns to Portuguese merchants.
- Slave Trade: Missionaries morally oppose the slave trade, which is conducted by Japanese traffickers beyond Jesuit control. The issue is acute in Kyushu but less prevalent in Honshu. Despite past efforts to curb the trade, the Jesuits have been unsuccessful. Coelho suggested Hideyoshi impose strict prohibitions on daimyo. Regarding Hideyoshi’s proposal, Coelho noted the Jesuits’ lack of authority over Portuguese merchants, neither endorsing nor rejecting the plan, and instead advocated for daimyo-led regulation of Japanese traffickers.
- Temple and Shrine Destruction (July 25): Missionaries lack political authority, and temple destruction or monk persecution stems from spontaneous acts by Japanese converts, beyond Jesuit control.

These responses clarified the Jesuits’ limited influence but failed to alleviate Hideyoshi’s suspicions. Later, Hideyoshi reneged on compensating Portuguese merchants for returned slaves, validating Coelho’s distrust of his promises.

=== Intent and context of the three questions ===
Hideyoshi’s questions were strategic, prioritizing Kyushu’s economic and political stability over moral concerns . Conversions caused labor outflows to Christian daimyo domains (e.g., Yokoseura, Nagasaki), creating regional imbalances. The slave trade depleted Kyushu’s workforce, while cow and horse consumption undermined agricultural and military resources.

The proposals aligned with contemporary negotiation practices, such as prohibitions and repatriation orders, to secure economic stability. Repatriation orders sought to return not only war- or trade-abducted subjects but also farmers who migrated voluntarily, ensuring labor availability. Following the Shimazu clan’s surrender in April 1587, Hideyoshi issued a repatriation order to restore civilians to their original domains, delegating slave trade issues to Jesuit negotiations. Coelho’s responses, particularly on the slave trade, avoided clear commitment, citing lack of authority over Japanese and Portuguese traders, and proposed daimyo regulations instead.

=== Chronology of events ===
Discrepancies between sources (Hideyoshi’s Hakata arrival: Fróis, July 15–19; Japanese sources, July 9; meeting frequency: Fróis, 3; Japanese sources, 1; ship visit: Fróis, July 19; Japanese sources, July 15) are reconciled by adopting the Japanese sources’ July 9 arrival, considering potential errors in Fróis’s letter (October 2, 1587, Dojima) or Historia. The integrated timeline follows:

Integrated timeline
Date	Event
June 24	Coelho and Fróis depart Nagasaki, staying 8 days in Hirado and 7 in Meinohama.
July 2	Travel from Hirado to Hakata.
July 9	Hideyoshi arrives in Hakata from Satsuma, camps at Hakozaki, and orders reconstruction of war-ravaged Hakata.
July 15	Hideyoshi, guided by Kamiya Sōtan, inspects Hakata port and Coelho’s ship, demanding Portuguese ship relocation and Hakata church reconstruction.
July 16	Jesuits visit Hideyoshi’s Hakozaki camp; he permits their Nagasaki return and plans Hakata’s reconstruction.
July 17	Hakata reconstruction begins.
July 22–23	Ukon visits the Jesuit ship, updating on negotiations with Hideyoshi.
July 23	Hideyoshi donates 200 koku of rice to shrines, hosts a tea ceremony at Hakozaki Matsubara, and issues an 11-article memorandum on Portuguese trade, including a slave trade ban.
July 24	Monteiro and Coelho visit Hideyoshi, apologizing for refusing ship relocation. Hideyoshi criticizes Ukon, presents an anti-Christianity document, and poses three questions. He executes two Christian Yellow Robe Corps members and issues a 5-article Jesuit expulsion order.
July 25	Hideyoshi’s messenger questions temple destruction and orders Jesuits to leave Japan within 20 days.

=== Negotiation breakdown and expulsion order ===
The Jesuits’ attempts to meet Hideyoshi from July 9–15 failed, but a “planned coincidence” of positioning their ship on his inspection route secured meetings on July 15–16. Coelho sought Hakata church reconstruction, but events escalated on July 24–25 with ship relocation refusals, Ukon’s expulsion, the execution of Yellow Robe Corps members, and the expulsion order.

Hideyoshi’s distrust arose from Christianity’s economic and political impacts: labor mobility from conversions, workforce depletion via the slave trade, and resource loss from livestock consumption. These concerns culminated in the July 23 memorandum (banning slave trade) and July 24 expulsion order. The order triggered church destruction and persecution, though complete expulsion within 20 days proved impractical. Konishi Yukinaga highlighted enforcement challenges, but Seyakuin Zenshu advocated harshly, suggesting remaining missionaries be “thrown into the sea”.

Hideyoshi’s proposals prioritized Kyushu’s stability. Coelho’s responses, aiming to preserve Jesuit influence, avoided clear commitments, especially on the slave trade, citing limited authority and proposing daimyo regulations. This ambiguity failed to address Hideyoshi’s concerns, leading to negotiation collapse. Coelho’s underestimation of Hideyoshi’s authority and prioritization of missionary networks precipitated the expulsion.

== Overview of the Bateren Edict ==
The Bateren Edict, issued by Toyotomi Hideyoshi on June 19, 1587, was a decree ordering the expulsion of Christian missionaries (referred to as "bateren", from the Portuguese padre) from Japan. Promulgated during Hideyoshi's campaign to unify Kyushu, the edict was a response to several perceived threats posed by Christianity.

=== Shinkoku and religious nativism ===
Hideyoshi declared Japan a "Land of the Gods" (Shinkoku), arguing that Christian teachings were a pernicious doctrine incompatible with Japan's syncretic religious traditions, which blended Shinto, Buddhism, and Confucianism. His push for deification after death likely fueled his religious nativism, as he might fear any obstacles to his own divinization as an absolute ruler.

=== Strategic deception grounded in conspiracy theories ===
British historian C. R. Boxer posits that the Edict of Expulsion of the Jesuits, issued by Toyotomi Hideyoshi in 1587, was not the result of whimsy or a sudden emotional outburst but rather the outcome of careful deliberation . Boxer supports this view with two primary arguments. First, he notes that the period during which Hideyoshi displayed an excessively friendly attitude toward Christianity aligns with an observation made by Valignano in his 1583 Sumario, which suggests that Japanese individuals tend to exhibit their most amicable demeanor immediately before launching an attack. This raises the possibility that Hideyoshi’s attitude was a "deceptive strategy" preceding an offensive action. Second, the concern that Christians were being used as "vanguards of invasion" stemmed from a widely circulated conspiracy theory, as evidenced in a 1578 letter by Luís Fróis. According to Boxer, this conspiracy theory had been propagated by monks since at least 1570. While figures such as Ōtomo and Oda Nobunaga dismissed it outright, Boxer speculates that Hideyoshi may have been influenced by such theories.

However, Boxer argues that assuming Hideyoshi genuinely believed in this conspiracy theory introduces several inconsistencies. For instance, while the Christian daimyo Takayama Ukon was exiled, other Christian daimyo, such as Konishi Yukinaga and Kuroda Yoshitaka, were stationed in Kyushu, where collaboration with missionaries was readily feasible, a fact that raises questions about the consistency of Hideyoshi’s policies.

The perspective that Jesuit missionary activities served as the "vanguard" of Portuguese and Spanish imperial conquest tends to oversimplify historical complexities. In the colonial endeavors of Portugal and Spain, missionary activities did not precede military conquest but rather followed it, and at times, they even conflicted with the political and military objectives of the empire. The concept of "spiritual conquest", thoroughly explored by French historian Robert Ricard in his 1933 study, analyzes the methods and dynamics of Christianization in Spanish and Portuguese America, challenging earlier simplistic interpretations. Recent scholarship has found little historical support for the view that missionaries acted as the "vanguard of invasion," and the hypothesis that Christianization preceded military and political conquest lacks academic endorsement. (Note: Although Spain and Portugal focused on Catholic missionary efforts, they were less successful in building overseas empires compared to the British and Dutch, whose decentralized governance, rooted in competition and mercantilism, proved more effective for efficient colonial expansion. In Asia, while Portugal supported Jesuit missionary activities, the British and Dutch, prioritizing territorial expansion over religious propagation, achieved greater success in establishing colonies.) Whether Toyotomi Hideyoshi genuinely believed in these unrealistic threats remains a subject of academic debate.

=== Military strategy and foreign policy ===
The Bateren Edict, which expelled missionaries, banned missionary activities, and pressured Christian daimyo to abandon their faith, was a key part of Hideyoshi's military and diplomatic strategy. This strategy, justified by his claimed divine right as the Child of the Sun, aimed at future conquests of the Philippines, India, and Europe, with missionaries and Christian daimyo seen as potential obstacles.

=== Portuguese slave trade and meat eating ===
A memorandum preceding Toyotomi Hideyoshi’s 1587 Bateren Expulsion Edict alleged that Christian missionaries were engaged in trafficking Japanese individuals to China, Korea, and various European territories. However, these accusations were conspicuously absent from the final edict. The edict explicitly distinguished trade from religious concerns, stating: "The purpose of the Black Ships is trade, and that is a different matter. As years and months pass, trade may be carried on in all sorts of articles." Furthermore, it permitted unrestricted entry and return for those who "do not disturb the Law of the Buddhas (merchants, needless to say, and whoever)" from the Kirishitan Country, emphasizing a degree of tolerance towards trade activities and merchants.

Following the edict, Hideyoshi assigned exclusive blame for the Portuguese slave trade to the Jesuit missionaries, ordering their expulsion, seizure of property, and destruction of their religious establishments. Paradoxically, Portuguese merchants—who in reality were the principal actors in the slave trade—were explicitly exempted from any sanctions. This selective condemnation protected Portuguese merchants from accountability despite their principal role in the human trafficking. Moreover, Hideyoshi’s subsequent establishment of licensed pleasure districts in 1589 highlights a moral inconsistency in his policies, tacitly legitimizing the sexual enslavement of women within Japan’s nascent licensed pleasure districts. This hypocrisy is further evidenced by his later complicity in the enslavement of Koreans during the Japanese invasions of Korea, revealing a strategic disregard for the moral implications of enslavement when it served Japanese interests.

The Jesuits established confraternities and the Nagasaki Misericórdia (almshouse), rescuing Japanese slaves, particularly women, from brothels and ships, and aiming to eradicate immoral practices through Christian evangelization. As part of these efforts, missionaries pressed Ōmura Sumitada to release unjustly held captives by leveraging the withholding of confession, promoting ethical conduct and highlighting criticism of the human trafficking practices tolerated in Japan. The fourth article of the Constitutions of Goa prohibited brothel operations, imposing penalties on violators and mandating the liberation of slaves coerced into prostitution, thereby demonstrating the Jesuits’ commitment to moral reform. These consistent efforts to improve slave treatment and rescue women stood in stark contrast to the widespread practice of slave trading in Japan at the time.

Following the Bateren Expulsion Edict, in 1589 (Tenshō 17), Toyotomi Hideyoshi ordered the establishment of the Yanagihara pleasure quarter in Kyoto. Regarded as Japan’s first pleasure quarter, this marked the formalization of the yūkaku system, yet it became a hotbed for human trafficking by procurers. According to the June 1597 records of Florentine traveler Francesco Carletti, who visited Japan, the conditions for women in Portuguese Macao and Nagasaki presented a stark contrast. In Macao, Chinese women were described as possessing “beautiful and refined features,” but strict restrictions prevented interactions with them. In contrast, in Hideyoshi-controlled Nagasaki, prostitution was openly practiced, and procurers offered women as commodities to arriving sailors, with human trafficking rampant.

His tolerance of abductions and enslavement during the Japanese invasions of Korea (1592–1598), driven by daimyo plundering for profit, further reveals his complicity in human trafficking. While he criticized missionaries and European traders for enslaving Japanese people abroad, his own actions in Korea, which involved much more violent practices, highlight a moral contradiction noted by historians. His condemnation of Christianity lacked ethical consistency, as his primary concern was preventing Japan's humiliation by foreign powers, not opposing slavery itself. Hideyoshi's worldview justified this asymmetry: Japan's actions, including spreading its culture or committing wartime atrocities, were deemed necessary or honorable, while foreign cultural influence or harm to Japan was framed as invasion or degradation. This logic rested on an ethnocentric belief in Japan's divine status and the perceived barbarity of others, exposing a double standard in his policies and rhetoric.

Beyond these moral considerations, Hideyoshi’s edict may have been partly influenced by economic factors. He perceived the Portuguese slave trade and associated dietary practices, such as meat consumption, as contributing to the depletion of Kyushu’s labor force. However, the actual economic impact was likely overstated, as the estimate suggests that, following the arrival of the Portuguese, the total number of Japanese slaves purchased or contracted ranged only from several hundred to a few thousand.

=== Political threat ===
Ōmura Sumitada donated Nagasaki to the Jesuits for personal benefit, retaining control as the town and Jesuits remained loyal. He granted perpetual usage rights and extraterritorial privileges in return for securing permanent port customs and entry taxes, with designated officials stationed to oversee their collection. Suspicions that Christian daimyo were ceding control to foreign powers raised concerns about undermining Hideyoshi's authority. If Sumitada suspected a Spanish takeover or fort, he would have reacted harshly, like Hideyoshi against the friars. Missionaries noted such an invasion was impossible, or the donation wouldn't have happened. Ties with Portuguese traders fueled fears of foreign interference, though concerns of a Christian "fifth column" were exaggerated, as Portuguese Macau and Spanish Manila lacked the capacity to challenge Japan.

George Sansom notes that the teachings of Christianity challenged social hierarchies and existing political structures, analyzing the Bateren Edict as a visceral defensive reaction by Toyotomi Hideyoshi, who, from the perspective of a dictator and autocrat, feared missionaries not merely as heretics but as a force undermining the foundation of social order. The Christian-influenced legal code in Nagasaki, blending Japanese customs with milder punishments and separating civil, criminal, ecclesiastical, and secular cases, implicitly challenged Hideyoshi's absolute authority as a dictator by undermining his rigid control over Japan's social-political order.

Seventeenth-century anti-Christian literature highlights several objectionable actions attributed to missionaries:

They sent out men to search throughout the Capital and its outskirts, in wayside chapels in the hills and plains, and even underneath bridges. They gathered in outcasts and beggars and others with diseases and afflictions, had them take a bath and cleanse the body, and gave them clothing, succor, shelter, and care.

The Jesuit missionaries' operation of hospitals for hinin and the gravely ill, involving contact with socially 'impure' lower strata such as those afflicted with leprosy, scurvy, or disabilities, led to their perception by the upper classes, including samurai and monks, as contaminated and marginal beings, resulting in their avoidance and alienation.

Moreover, an arrow unearthed during the 1637 Shimabara Rebellion bore the inscription, "Among all sentient beings there is no such distinction as noble and base." Historian George Elison notes that, although not a direct teaching of the missionaries, this egalitarian sentiment reflects how Christian proselytization introduced ideas at odds with Japan’s rigid social hierarchy.

=== Iconoclasm ===
The destruction of Buddhist temples and Shinto shrines by Christian converts, particularly in Kyushu, was cited as a grievance, though Hideyoshi's own history of attacking Buddhist institutions suggests this was a pretext. The destructions were confined to specific territories and not a nationwide phenomenon. Jesuit leaders promoted restraint, allowing Christianity to coexist with hostile local religions in many areas. Hideyoshi exaggerated the political significance of limited temple and shrine destructions, portraying them as a national humiliation. Historically, such destruction was not widespread, and the narrative of its prevalence was amplified by Hideyoshi's strategic biases.

=== Nanban trade ===
The edict banned Christian missionary work but welcomed trade with Christian domains to secure a trade monopoly and strengthen his power. Hideyoshi later seized Nagasaki, one of the Japan's wealthiest trading port, along with Mogi and Urakami from the Ōmura and Arima clans, destroyed churches, and fined residents heavily. Historian Fujino Tamotsu notes that Hideyoshi made Nagasaki a directly controlled territory to monopolize its unparalleled trade profits.

== Discussion ==
The edict followed a confrontation between Hideyoshi and Jesuit missionary Gaspar Coelho, triggered by accusations of temple destruction and slave trading by Seyakuin Zenshu, a Buddhist advisor. It addressed economic concerns, such as labor shortages in Kyushu due to the slave trade and meat eating, and political fears of Christian daimyo like Ōmura forming a pro-European faction. The 1580 donation of Nagasaki to the Jesuits, while profitable for Ōmura, fueled suspicions of foreign encroachment. Hideyoshi's vision of Japan as a Shinkoku, influenced by Zen monk Saisho Jotai and Yoshida Shinto theories, clashed with the Christian worldview, particularly as converts, inspired by missionary zeal, destroyed traditional religious sites. The mission's appeal to oppressed agricultural and fishing communities, who saw Christianity as liberation from feudal oppression, further alarmed authorities. However, Hideyoshi's inconsistent enforcement—allowing Valignano's return in 1590 and using missionaries as trade intermediaries—reflects his pragmatic reliance on Portuguese commerce. As a despotic ruler, Hideyoshi viewed Christianity as subversive, challenging Japan's syncretic religious and political structure, a reaction historians like Asao Naohiro link to a nativist response against European influence.

Historian Rômulo da Silva Ehalt argues that human trafficking predated Portuguese arrival in Japan and was widely known across the archipelago, challenging Okamoto Yoshitomo's claim that Hideyoshi, enraged by discovering the slave trade, issued the Bateren Expulsion Order out of moral outrage. Instead, Hideyoshi's interrogatory reveals his primary concerns were economic, such as labor shortages in Kyushu and the influence of Jesuit missionaries, rather than ethical issues. Hideyoshi ordered the return of displaced people—whether trafficked, kidnapped, or voluntarily fled—to their fiefs to stabilize agricultural production, a policy applied nationwide, not just in Kyushu. He also expressed concerns about meat consumption depleting livestock essential for agriculture and war, offering to build a facility for foreigners to consume hunted animals if missionaries couldn't abstain from meat. These actions reflect Hideyoshi's focus on consolidating control and ensuring economic stability.

In 16th-century Kyushu, zealous lower-class Christian converts destroyed Buddhist temples and Shinto shrines, perceiving them as symbols of feudal oppression. Yet, the motives—missionary zeal, retaliations of converts escaping persecution, peasant uprisings, or daimyo's public safety and defense strategies—remain uncertain due to biased and unreliable Western and Tokugawa-era Japanese sources. Jesuit leaders Francisco Cabral and Alessandro Valignano, succeeding Cosme de Torrés, opposed iconoclasm as counterproductive, and significant destruction after Valignano's Visitor appointment is questionable, undermining claims of widespread Jesuit-driven iconoclasm. Christian daimyo like Ōmura Sumitada, who blended Christian and Buddhist identities, as shown by a daimyo's 1574 Shingon tonsure, likely allowed temple destruction for strategic, not solely religious, purposes.

== Criticisms ==
Hideyoshi's motivations are criticized as inconsistent and possibly hypocritical. His claim of Christian attacks on Shinto shrines and Buddhist temples contradicts his and Nobunaga's own destruction of Buddhist institutions, such as the Negoroshu monks. His sudden shift from viewing Christians as allies, as Nobunaga did, to enemies is seen as poorly justified, possibly driven by arbitrary or economic concerns rather than moral outrage. Fears of a Christian "fifth column" were exaggerated, as neither Portuguese Macau nor Spanish Manila had the capacity to challenge Japan. The removal of the slave trade condemnation from the final edict suggests economic pragmatism, as Hideyoshi relied on Portuguese trade. Later, during the 1597 Korean invasion, his administration endorsed the enslavement of Korean captives to finance the war, contradicting earlier moral stances, as noted by historian Okamoto.

== Aftermath ==
The edict demanded that missionaries leave Japan within 20 days, though it was not consistently enforced. Hideyoshi continued to use Jesuits as interpreters and trade intermediaries, indicating pragmatic motives behind the decree.

=== Portuguese slave trade ===
Hideyoshi's 1587 Bateren Edict, driven by economic concerns over labor depletion rather than moral objections, as Maki noted, briefly curtailed slave trades. However, his 1597 second invasion of Korea actively endorsed the slave trade, transforming it into a major industry. Contemporary sources describe a "gruesome scenario" where Japanese forces brought crowds of Korean prisoners to islands for sale to Portuguese merchants, who circumvented Macanese bans and Martins' excommunication. While the Jesuits completely withdrew their desperate measure of regulating the slave trade of Portuguese merchants and made a strong statement that they would not relent in excommunicating merchants outside their jurisdiction, Hideyoshi's policies expected Korean enslavement, reversing earlier restrictions. The 1592 Dochirina Kirishitan emphasized redeeming captives as a Christian duty, rooted in Christ's atonement, yet Jesuits lacked the authority to enforce the prohibition of slavery, as Valignano repeatedly argued.

The Spanish 1542 New Laws offered some recourse, as seen in Gaspar Fernández's 1599 liberation in New Spain, where he argued his enslavement lacked just war justification, and Japanese were equivalent to free indigenous people, citing that Spanish laws banning the enslavement of Japanese. Only 4 of 225 identified chino (Asian) slave sent from Philippines to Acapulco were Japanese. After the 1614 Jesuit expulsion from Japan, Jesuits worked to liberate Japanese and Korean slaves, while Portuguese merchants continued the slave trade. Post-1614, Dutch and English buyers joined the trade possibly due to Portuguese trade bans. Nagasaki and Hirado served as key sites for the slave trade conducted by Portuguese, Dutch, English, and Spanish traders. From their arrival in Japan until their expulsion, the Portuguese traded an estimated hundred to thousand Japanese slaves.

=== Failed invasion of Korea and thriving slave trade ===
Hideyoshi's 1592 invasion of Korea with 160,000 troops, followed by a second campaign in 1597, aimed to conquer China but failed spectacularly. After six years, Japanese forces retreated, and Hideyoshi died in 1598, having mobilized 500,000 troops without achieving his goals.

During the Japanese invasions of Korea, approximately 50,000 to 60,000 individuals were captured by Japanese forces, with only 7,500 repatriated to Korea through diplomatic efforts post-war. The Bateren Edict restricted the slave trade and exempted Jesuits from intervening in merchants' activities for a few years, yet captives continued to be trafficked to Nagasaki. Toyotomi Hideyoshi's administration sought to finance the war through the Portuguese slave trade, abandoning earlier moral objections. Bishop Pedro Martins excommunicated those trading Japanese and Korean slaves, including those in temporary servitude, a policy Bishop Cerqueira later reinforced. Hideyoshi's tacit approval of daimyo-led abductions and enslavement for plunder implicates him in human trafficking. Atrocities, including the enslavement of non-Japanese, were rationalized as necessary and honorable, reflecting the Toyotomi regime's ethnocentric worldview. While the Portuguese traded an estimated hundreds up to thousands of Japanese slaves since their arrival in Japan, the number of Korean slaves abducted to Japan was far greater.

=== Slave practices and karayuki-san ===
The slave trade persisted despite the edict, as enforcement was lax and economic incentives remained strong. By the late 16th century, the practice of nenkihōkō (temporary servitude) was common, with some Japanese voluntarily entering servitude to escape poverty. The establishment of yūkaku (pleasure quarters) by Hideyoshi in 1589, such as Kyoto's Yanagihara, facilitated human trafficking, with women and girls sold into prostitution. This practice evolved into the karayuki-san phenomenon, where Japanese women were trafficked to Southeast Asia, particularly after the Edo period's expansion of pleasure quarters like Maruyama in Nagasaki, where they were sold into prostitution to serve Chinese and other foreign clients.

=== San Felipe incident ===
In 1596, the Spanish ship San Felipe ran aground in Japan, and its pilot, Francisco de Olandia, allegedly boasted about Spanish colonial ambitions, prompting Hideyoshi to execute 26 Christians in Nagasaki in 1597. No primary sources confirm Olandia's testimony, and tensions between Portuguese Jesuits and Spanish Franciscans intensified, with each blaming the other for the martyrdoms. Concerns about a Christian 'fifth column' were overstated, as Portuguese Macau and Spanish Manila lacked the resources and influence to pose a significant threat to Japan. Whether Toyotomi Hideyoshi genuinely believed in these unrealistic threats remains a subject of academic debate.

According to Luis Frois's History of Japan, before the 1587 Edict of Expulsion and prior to the San Felipe incident, Toyotomi Hideyoshi suspected that missionaries were conspiring to use Christian daimyo to conquer Japan, alleging they employed sophisticated knowledge and cunning methods to win over Japanese nobles and elites with a unity stronger than the Ikkō sect, aiming to occupy and conquer Japan. Spanish merchants alleged Jesuits, including Martins, Organtino, and Rodrigues, described Spaniards to Hideyoshi's minister as pirates and the Spanish king as a tyrant, claims Rodrigues denied. These accusations and the Jesuits' perception of Hideyoshi's suspicions may have led the Jesuits to craft self-defensive narratives, a possibility that remains plausible. Elison (Elisonas) argues that the Franciscan account is more plausible, but acknowledges that its veracity cannot be definitively confirmed.

Hideyoshi ordered the execution of 26 Christians in Nagasaki, known as the 26 Martyrs of Japan. Triggered by a lavish Franciscan church in Kyoto, seen as lèse-majesty, the initial target of 170 was reduced to 26. The Nanbanji temple was dismantled, but smaller churches remained, and no further major restrictions were imposed, indicating Hideyoshi's focus was on authority, not eradicating Christianity, mirroring his approach to Buddhist institutions. The notion of a Christian fifth column lacks strong evidence, as the charge was specifically lèse-majesty, not a broader conspiratorial threat.

=== Invasion plans for the Philippines ===
In 1587, the arrival of two Japanese ships in the Philippines raised alarms among Spanish authorities, who viewed their presence as inconsistent with the hostile diplomatic stance of the Bateren Expulsion Edict (1587). This prompted Spain to bolster defenses in anticipation of potential Japanese aggression. By 1589, a group of Japanese, posing as pilgrims, was observed reconnoitering the Manila region, an act the Spanish interpreted as the onset of an expansionist policy triggered by the edict. In 1591, Harada Magoshichirō reportedly conducted a field survey to assess the feasibility of conquering the Philippines, deepening mutual distrust between Spain and Japan.

In June 1592, as Japan was poised to annex Korea, documents from the Mōri and Nabeshima families indicate that Toyotomi Hideyoshi articulated ambitions beyond the Philippines, declaring, “Conquering the pristine Great Ming should be as easy as crushing an egg under a mountain. Not only the Great Ming, but also India and the Southern Barbarians (Southeast Asia, Portugal, Spain, and Europe) shall be thus”. Hideyoshi outlined plans for invasions targeting Ming China, India, and the Southern Barbarians, promising his vanguard land grants in India with unrestricted territorial acquisition.

In 1592, Harada Kiēmon arrived in Manila, delivering a letter from Hideyoshi demanding the Philippines’ surrender and tribute. Governor Gómez Pérez Dasmariñas responded on May 1, 1592, entrusting the Dominican friar Juan Cobo with the reply. Cobo, accompanied by Antonio López, a Chinese Christian, traveled to Japan and met Hideyoshi at Nagoya Castle in Kyushu, built for the Korean campaign. Harada Kiēmon later led a second Japanese mission to Manila, during which López safely returned.

On June 1, 1593, López faced rigorous questioning under oath in Manila about his observations in Japan, focusing on Japan’s intentions to invade the Philippines. He reported that Hideyoshi had tasked Harada Kiēmon with the conquest. López elaborated on Japan’s motives: “It is universally known that the Philippines abound in gold. For this reason, soldiers are eager to come here, whereas they are reluctant to go to the poor land of Korea”. When questioned about the Philippines’ military strength, López claimed 4,000 to 5,000 Spaniards were present, prompting derision from the Japanese, who asserted that the islands’ defenses were negligible and that 100 Japanese soldiers equaled 200–300 Spaniards. Those López encountered believed Harada Kiēmon would govern the Philippines post-conquest.

Regarding the invasion force, López heard that 100,000 troops would be deployed under Hasegawa Sōnin’s command. However, upon learning that the Philippines had 5,000–6,000 soldiers, with 3,000–4,000 guarding Manila, the Japanese deemed 10,000 troops sufficient, planning to transport 5,000–6,000 soldiers on ten large ships. López speculated that the invasion would route through the Ryukyu Islands.

In 1596, the San Felipe incident prompted the reinstatement of the previously unenforced Bateren Expulsion Edict. In February 1597, Martín de la Ascensión, one of the 26 martyrs executed, wrote to the Philippine governor, warning of his impending execution and Hideyoshi’s invasion plans. He noted, “(Hideyoshi) is preoccupied with the Koreans this year and cannot go to Luzon, but he intends to do so next year”. Martín also described the invasion route: “He plans to occupy the Ryukyus and Taiwan, deploy troops to Cagayan, and, if God does not intervene, advance from there to Manila”. The renewal of the Bateren Expulsion Edict reignited Spanish concerns in the Philippines about a potential invasion by Hideyoshi.

=== Inconsistent execution of edicts ===
The 1587 edict was not rigorously enforced, as Hideyoshi valued trade with the Portuguese and used Jesuits as intermediaries. Missionaries reduced public activities but continued their work covertly. The edict's inconsistent application allowed Christianity to persist in Nagasaki, where Jesuit influence remained strong until the early 17th century.

=== Tokugawa persecution ===
Under Tokugawa Ieyasu, who succeeded Hideyoshi, Christian persecution intensified. In 1614, Ieyasu issued a comprehensive expulsion decree, ordering all missionaries to leave and destroying Christian institutions. This was followed by Tokugawa Hidetada's decrees in 1616 and 1619. The 1619 Kyoto executions (52 people, including four children and a pregnant woman) and the 1622 Nagasaki executions (55 people, including children as young as three) marked a brutal escalation.

== Transcriptions ==
=== 11-article memorandum ===
The 11-article memorandum was issued on the 18th day of the 6th month of the 15th year of the Tenshō era, according to the traditional Japanese calendar, which corresponds to the date July 24, 1587, in the Gregorian calendar.

- 伴天連門徒之儀ハ、其者之可為心次第事、
- 国郡在所を御扶持に被遣候を、其知行中之寺庵百姓已下を心ざしも無之所、押而給人伴天連門徒可成由申、理不尽成候段曲事候事、
- 其国郡知行之義、給人被下候事ハ当座之義ニ候、給人ハかはり候といへ共、百姓ハ不替ものニ候條、理不尽之義何かに付て於有之ハ、給人を曲事可被仰出候間、可成其意候事。
- 弐百町ニ三千貫より上之者、伴天連ニ成候に於いてハ、奉得公儀御意次第ニ成可申候事、
- 右の知行より下を取候者ハ、八宗九宗之義候條、其主一人宛ハ心次第可成事、
- 伴天連門徒之儀ハ一向宗よりも外ニ申合候由、被聞召候、一向宗其国郡ニ寺内をして給人へ年貢を不成並加賀一国門徒ニ成候而国主之富樫を追出、一向衆之坊主もとへ令知行、其上越前迄取候而、天下之さはりニ成候儀、無其隠候事。
- 本願寺門徒其坊主、天満ニ寺を立させ、雖免置候、寺内ニ如前々ニは不被仰付事、
- 国郡又ハ在所を持候大名、其家中之者共を伴天連門徒押付成候事ハ、本願寺門徒之寺内を立て候よりも不可然義候間、天下之さわり可成候條、其分別無之者ハ可被加御成敗候事、
- 伴天連門徒心ざし次第ニ下々成候義ハ、八宗九宗之儀候間不苦事、
- 大唐、南蛮、高麗江日本仁を売遣侯事曲事、付、日本ニおゐて人の売買停止の事。
- 牛馬ヲ売買、ころし食事、是又可為曲事事。

右條々堅被停止畢、若違犯之族有之は忽可被処厳科者也、

天正十五年六月十八日 朱印 — 天正十五年六月十八日付覚

==== Translation ====
1. Being a Christian should be at the discretion of the person.
2. It is unreasonable for the daimyo to force its people to become a Christian even though the temples and peasants in the territory are not willing to do so.
3. It is only temporary that the daimyo orders to rule the country, so even if the daimyo changes, the peasant does not change, so it is possible for the daimyo to rule the country wrong. if the daimyo says something wrong, he can do what he wants.
4. A daimyo with more than 3,000 Kan and 200 towns can become a Christian with the permission of Hideyoshi.
5. Those (daimyo) who have less may be up to the person's wishes, like Hassyu-Kussyu (number of buddhism sects), since it is religious matter
6. have heard that Ikko-shu may show more than Ikko-shu for Christians, but Ikko-shu not only does not pay the annual tribute to the daimyo by setting up a temple territory (Jinaicho) in the country, but also tries to make whole Kaga province Ikko-shu. Togashi, the daimyo, was banished and ordered to be ruled by a priest of the Ikko sect. It's a fact that can't be hidden anymore.
7. The monks of Honganji temple are allowed to set up a temple in the land of Tenma (= Tenma Honganji), but this kind of temple territory (of the Ikko sect) has never been allowed.
8. It is not possible for a daimyo with a national county or territory to make his vassals Christians than for a sect of Honganji to set up a temple territory. Those who do not understand can be punished.
9. It does not matter that a person with a lower status (rather than a daimyo, etc.) becomes a Christian at will, as in the case of the eight sects and nine sects.
10. It is unreasonable to sell Japanese to China, Nanban, and the Korean Peninsula. Therefore, in Japan, the buying and selling of people is prohibited.
11. Buying and selling cows and horses, and killing and eating them are also a shame.

However, Hideyoshi says that he will punish those who take this opportunity to harm the missionaries. Although compulsory conversion to Christianity is prohibited, the people are free to believe in Christianity on their own initiative, and the daimyo can become a believer with the permission of Hideyoshi. In fact, it guaranteed freedom of religion. Immediately after this, Hideyoshi took Nagasaki from the Jesuits and made it a tenryo.

=== Bateren expulsion edict ===
The 5-article Bateren expulsion edict was issued the next day, on the 6th month, 19th day of the year Tenshō-15, which corresponds to July 25, 1587.

定
- 日本ハ神國たる處、きりしたん國より邪法を授候儀、太以不可然候事。
- 其國郡之者を近附、門徒になし、神社佛閣を打破らせ、前代未聞候。國郡在所知行等給人に被下候儀者、當座之事候。天下よりの御法度を相守諸事可得其意處、下々として猥義曲事事。
- 伴天連其智恵之法を以、心さし次第二檀那を持候と被思召候ヘバ、如右日域之佛法を相破事前事候條、伴天連儀日本之地ニハおかせられ間敷候間、今日より廿日之間二用意仕可歸國候。其中に下々伴天連儀に不謂族申懸もの在之ハ、曲事たるへき事。
- 黑船之儀ハ商買之事候間、各別に候之條、年月を經諸事賣買いたすへき事。
- 自今以後佛法のさまたけを不成輩ハ、商人之儀ハ不及申、いつれにてもきりしたん國より往還くるしからす候條、可成其意事。

已上

天正十五年六月十九日 朱印 — 吉利支丹伴天連追放令

==== Translation ====
1. Even though Japan is a country protected by its own gods, it is completely unreasonable to introduce the evil law from the Christian country.
2. I have never heard such things that local people are brought closer to the (Christian) teachings, made (Christian) believers, and destroyed the temples and shrines. It is only temporary that (Hideyoshi) has the daimyo of each country rule the territory. You should obey the law from the Tenka (Hodeyoshi's rule) and do various things as its rule but it is unreasonable not to do it with a sloppy attitude.
3. Christian missionaries, by their wisdom, thought that they would leave it to the free will of the people to make them believers, but as I wrote earlier, they violated Japanese Buddhist law. It is not possible to have a Christian missionary in Japan, so get ready in 20 days from today and return to the Christian country. It would be a shame if anyone insisted that he was not a Christian missionary even he is.
4. Since the trade ship is coming to do business, it is different from this (Edict), so continue to do business in the future too.
5. From now on, it is permitted to visit Japan from the Christian country at any time, even if you're not a merchant, as long as it doesn't interfere with Buddhist law, so I'll allow it.

6th month, 19th day, Tenshō era, 15th year

== See also ==
- Toyotomi Hideyoshi
- Imjin War
- Slavery in Japan

== Bibliography ==
- Ehalt, Rômulo da Silva (2018). Jesuits and the problem of slavery in early modern Japan (PDF) (PhD thesis). Tokyo University of Foreign Studies. doi:10.15026/91848.
