= Slavery in Japan =

History of slavery and coerced labor in Japan

Slavery in Japan existed in several forms from antiquity through the modern period, alongside and proceeding other systems of unfree and coerced labor, some manifestations of which continue to this day. In early Japanese sources, enslaved people included groups referred to as seikō (生口) and later nuhi (奴婢) under the ritsuryō legal codes, and historians debate how these institutions compare with slavery and serfdom in other societies.

By the late medieval and Sengoku periods, the buying and selling of captives and other dependent people remained widespread, including the export of Japanese people through the Portuguese slave trade in the 16th century. Under Toyotomi Hideyoshi, slavery was officially banned in the late 16th century, but other forms of legally sanctioned coercion and dependency continued, including penal “non-free labor” under early Edo-period law.

In the 20th century, Japan’s wartime empire used large-scale forced labor and prisoner-of-war labor during the Second Sino-Japanese War and the Pacific War, including on projects such as the Burma Railway. The Imperial Japanese military also operated the system of military brothels commonly referred to as “comfort women”, which has been widely described as involving sexual slavery.

== Early slavery in Japan ==
The export of a slave from Japan is recorded in the 3rd century Chinese historical record Wajinden, but it is unclear what system was involved, and whether this was a common practice at that time. These slaves were called seikō (生口 "living mouth").

In the 8th century, slaves were called Nuhi (奴婢) and laws were issued under the legal codes of the Nara and Heian periods, called Ritsuryōsei (律令制). These slaves tended farms and worked around houses. Information on the slave population is questionable, but the proportion of slaves is estimated to have been around 5% of the population.

Slavery persisted into the Sengoku period (1467–1615) even though the attitude that slavery was anachronistic seems to have become widespread among elites. Somewhat later, the Edo period penal laws prescribed "non-free labor" for the immediate family of executed criminals in Article 17 of the Gotōke reijō (Tokugawa House Laws), but the practice never became common. The 1711 Gotōke reijō was compiled from over 600 statutes promulgated between 1597 and 1696.

=== War prisoners and Genin ===
During the Sengoku period, Japanese Daimyos and merchants often sold off prisoners of battle into slavery. Portuguese sources, corroborated by Japanese texts like Koyo Gunkan and Hojo Godaiki, describe “the greatest cruelties” inflicted during conflicts such as the 1553 Battle of Kawanakajima and the 1578 Shimazu campaigns. Captives, particularly women, boys, and girls, faced violence, with communities in regions devastated. The inter-Asian slave trade, including Wokou piracy, further intensified suffering, with Zheng Shungong’s 1556 report noting 200–300 Chinese slaves in Satsuma treated “like cattle” for labor, a fate shared by many Japanese.

When the Imjin War broke out between Japan with Korean Joseon kingdom between 1592-1598, slavery of Korean captives by three Japanese invaders also occurred. Francesco Carletti, an Italian merchant who visited Japan during that time, was recorded to have bought five Korean slaves for price of about 12 scudi. After baptizing them, he took them to Goa, India, where he set four of them free. It has been suggested that Korean slaves were not traded at high prices, and therefore were cheap. Even if they were bought at low prices, they still needed to be fed on the way, which was an additional expense. Thus, Japanese researcher Watanabe Daimon suspected the reason Carletti freed four of his slaves was possibly because he thought there was no hope of reselling them in the slave market.

The custom of geninka (下人化) encompassed practices resembling slavery. (Note: Genin (下人) were low-status, often hereditary servants in medieval Japan, employed in agricultural or household labor. Known as fudai no genin (譜代の下人, hereditary servants) or similar terms, they were subject to customary practices allowing their sale.) Individuals were exchanged for money, including children sold by parents, self-sold persons, those rescued from unjust execution, and debt-bound workers. Japanese rulers imposed geninka as punishment for serious crimes or rebellion, often extending it to the perpetrator’s wife and children. Women who fled their fathers or husbands to seek shelter in a lord’s house were sometimes transformed into genin by the lord. During famines or natural disasters, individuals offered themselves as genin in exchange for food, clothing, and shelter. Japanese lords also demanded that retainers relinquish their daughters to serve in their manors, treating them as genin. Additionally, the genin status could be hereditary, perpetuating bondage across generations.

=== Portuguese Slave Trade in Japan ===
==== Background ====
Portuguese merchants in Sengoku-era Japan (1467–1603) viewed unfree labor forms, like master-servant relationships, as slavery, applying terms like criado, servo, and captivo to Japanese classes such as fudai no genin (hereditary servants), genin (lower-class servants), shojū (retainers), and yatsuko (slaves). These groups, often engaged in agricultural or domestic work, were sometimes sold under customary law. The term escravo included nenki hōkō (indentured servants) which was not common until Edo Period, despite their distinct status, causing misunderstandings. Gaspar Vilela (1557) described peasants as slaves due to economic dependence, while Cosme de Torres likened servants’ subservience to Roman vitae necisque potestas. Peasants could be sold as tax collateral, blurring free-unfree distinctions. Human trafficking was common. Some Japanese entered servitude voluntarily for travel to Macau, often breaking contracts upon arrival, driven by civil war taxes.

By the early 16th century, African slave trade networks supplied Portugal’s Atlantic islands and southern regions, enabled by low costs and accessible sources. Asian Portuguese territories lacked large-scale plantations, limiting slave demand to domestic labor. Asian slaves, including Japanese and Chinese, were valued as household servants, artisans, or status symbols, with high transport costs deterring large-scale trade to South America or Portugal. Merchants prioritized spices over slavery. In 16th-century Portugal, Chinese and Japanese slaves were far fewer than East Indian, Muslim convert, or African slaves. In Mexico City, Asian slaves (indios chinos), mostly from the Philippines and India, numbered 88 in a 1595 inquisition survey, compared to 10,000 African slaves. An average of 30 slaves were on each galleon, with an estimated 3,630 "Indios Chinos" slaves entering Nueva España between 1565 and 1673. In Mexico City, 22% of the Asian population were women. One-third of these "indios chinos" were slaves, mostly from the Philippines or India, with very few from Japan, Brunei, or Java. Asian slavery was significantly less prevalent than the Atlantic slave trade.

In 1570, King Sebastian I banned ships under 300 or over 450 tons. Portugal’s fleet never exceeded 300 ships, with only 34 of 66 returning from India (1585–1597). Nau ships, used for Portugal-India and Macau-Japan trade, reached 600 tons (1100 tons displacement), carrying 400–450 people, including crew, passengers, soldiers, and limited slaves. A nau or galleon with a cargo capacity of 900 tons or more, (Note: If the aforementioned calculations were to be applied as is, 1,600 tons displacement in modern terms.) could carry 77 crew, 18 gunners, 317 soldiers, and 26 families. The Macau-Japan route, limited to a yearly cycle due to trade winds, prioritized silk (1000–2500 pico, 60–150 tons), with cargo holds of 250–400 cubic meters, supplemented by Japanese goods like sulfur, silver, and lacquerware, affecting passenger capacity. However, between 1594 and 1614, the annual ship from Macao failed to arrive on eight occasions, indicating the instability of navigational success. Lucio de Souza assessed Portuguese ships’ slave-carrying capacity, but Guillaume Carré criticized the lack of precise data.

Papal decrees (Sublimis Deus, 1537) and the 1542 New Laws of the Indies banned enslaving East Asians(indios chinos), legally indios. In 1571, King Sebastian I of Portugal banned Japanese human trafficking, following a 1567 law prohibiting the slave trade from Ethiopia, Japan, and China, with further bans issued later. In 1591, Pope Gregory XIV’s bull Cum Sicuti ordered reparations for enslaved indios in Philippines, threatened slave owners with excommunication, and mandated their liberation. King Philip III also prohibited the transfer of female slaves to Mexico, reflecting growing efforts to restrict slavery despite uneven enforcement. Portugal prohibited Japanese and Chinese slave trading in 1595, with 1605 decrees allowing enslaved Japanese in Goa and Cochin to seek freedom.

The Spanish 1542 New Laws offered some recourse, as seen in Gaspar Fernández’s 1599 liberation in New Spain, where he argued his enslavement lacked just war justification, and Japanese were equivalent to free indigenous people, citing that Spanish laws banning the enslavement of Japanese. Only 4 of 225 identified chino (Asian) slave sent from Philippines to Acapulco were Japanese.

Filippo Sassetti saw some Chinese and Japanese slaves in Lisbon among the large slave community in 1578, although most of the slaves were black.

The Portuguese "highly regarded" Asian slaves like Chinese and Japanese. The Portuguese attributed qualities like intelligence and industriousness to Chinese and Japanese slaves which is why they favoured them.

==== Arrival of Portuguese ====
After the Portuguese first made contact with Japan in 1543, a large-scale slave trade developed in which Portuguese purchased Japanese as slaves in Japan and sold them to various locations overseas, mostly in Portuguese-colonized regions of Asia such as Goa but including Brazil and Portugal itself, until it was formally outlawed in 1595. Many documents mention the large slave trade along with protests against the enslavement of Japanese. Although the actual number of slaves is debated, the proportions on the number of slaves tends to be exaggerated by some Japanese historians. At least several hundred Japanese people were sold; some of them were prisoners of war sold by rival clans, others were sold by their feudal lords, and others were sold by their families to escape poverty. The Japanese slaves are believed to be the first of their nation to end up in Europe, and the Portuguese purchased a number of Japanese slave women to bring to Portugal for sexual purposes, as noted by the Church in 1555. Sebastian of Portugal feared that this was having a negative effect on Catholic proselytization since the slave trade in Japanese was growing to larger proportions, so he commanded that it be banned in 1571. However, the ban failed to prevent Portuguese merchants from buying Japanese slaves and the trade continued into the late 16th century.

The Jesuit Luis de Almeida, in 1562, documented a group of Chinese female slaves at Tomari Port in Kawanabe District, Satsuma Province. According to his account, these women were captured by the Japanese during wars in China and sold, subsequently purchased by the Portuguese. Lacking the authority to regulate the commercial activities of merchants, Almeida could only request that the honor and safety of these women be safeguarded during their voyage.

Japanese slave women were also sold as concubines to Asian lascars, along with their European counterparts serving on Portuguese ships trading in Japan, mentioned by Luis de Cerqueira, a Portuguese Jesuit, in a 1598 document. Japanese slaves were brought by the Portuguese to Macau, where some of them not only ended up being bought by the Portuguese, but as slaves to other slaves, with the Portuguese owning Malay and African slaves, who in turn owned Japanese slaves of their own.

Jesuit-established organizations, such as confraternities and the Nagasaki Misericórdia (almshouse), undertook efforts to rescue Japanese slaves, particularly women, from ships and brothels. The memoirs of Afonso de Lucena and letters of Luis Fróis concur regarding the treatment of captives during the Battle of Nagayo Castle in March 1587, reflecting Lucena’s concerns about their legitimacy. After Christmas 1586, Lucena urged Ōmura Sumitada, whose health was failing, to free unjustly held captives, leveraging the threat of withholding confession. The Jesuits strategically withheld confession or sacraments to compel moral conduct, especially among influential converts.

Moreover, bishops and their representatives condemned brothels and private prostitution as “workshops of the devil.” The fourth article of the Constitutions of Goa (1568) prohibited brothel ownership and operation, imposing fines and public shaming on violators, while mandating the liberation of slaves coerced into prostitution. Thus, the Jesuits endeavored to eradicate immoral practices like prostitution while advancing slave rescue and evangelization through conversion.

Japanese socio-economic practices, such as nenkihōkō (temporary servitude), were often conflated with slavery by Europeans but involved distinct treatment. Bishop Cerqueira noted that nenkihōkō met European moral theology standards, such as Silvestre Mazzolini’s criteria, requiring voluntary agreement and awareness of freedom. However, economic pressures, like taxes imposed by non-Christian lords, led parents to sell children into servitude, often under “great” rather than “extreme” necessity, reflecting cultural relativism in assessing hardship. Cosme de Torres likened the power of Japanese lords over servants to Roman vitae necisque potestas, suggesting that peasants, used as tax guarantors, faced conditions akin to slavery, with little distinction between servitude and enslavement. Women seeking refuge from abusive situations could be transformed into genin by lords, a practice Jesuits deemed tolerable only if the individual was justly condemned for a crime; otherwise, missionaries advocated for their liberation through confession.

In Portuguese India, Valignano and fellow Jesuits lacked jurisdiction to intervene in slave transactions, which were subject to secular courts. Priests were limited to providing ethical guidance, rendering the cessation of the practice unfeasible, and it persisted into the seventeenth century. In Japan, the Macao Diocese, established in 1568, oversaw Japan from 1576, but the absence of a resident bishop impeded the resolution of local issues. The Jesuits’ attempt to establish an independent diocese required explicit approval from Rome. Given the limited impact of admonitions and recommendations, missionaries sought to navigate local social dynamics within the constraints of ecclesiastical law. They categorized labor into three forms: servitude equivalent to slavery, a tolerable non-slavery condition, and an unacceptable state. This distinction is believed to have led missionaries to reluctantly acquiesce to local customs. Furthermore, missionaries critical of the Portuguese slave trade in Japan, unable to directly prevent Portuguese merchants’ slave purchases due to insufficient authority, advocated for reframing Japan’s prevalent perpetual human trafficking as a form of indentured servitude (yearly contract labor) to align with local practices while mitigating the harshest aspects of exploitation.

Alessandro Valignano’s strategy of “tolerance” and “dissimulation” allowed Jesuits to navigate local customs while condemning egregious abuses. The 1592 Dochirina Kirishitan emphasized redeeming captives as a Christian duty, rooted in Christ’s atonement, yet Jesuits lacked the authority to enforce the prohibition of slavery, as Valignano repeatedly argued.

The Jesuit response to slave treatment was shaped by theological distinctions between perpetual slavery (iustae captivitas) and temporary servitude (temporali famulitium), with the latter deemed acceptable for Japanese and Chinese slaves, as they were not war captives or "common slaves." Recognizing their limited power, the Jesuits sought to reform Japan's system of perpetual slavery (永代人身売買) into indentured servitude (年季奉公). Some missionaries, driven by humanitarian concerns, signed short-term ownership certificates (schedulae) to prevent the greater harm of lifelong enslavement. The practice of issuing permits for temporary servitude in Japan, recognized as early as 1568 with Melchior Carneiro's arrival in Macao, gained official or local acknowledgment. The intervention of missionaries in Japan, particularly in issuing short-term permits, likely peaked between 1568 and the period following the 1587 Bateren Edict, when permit issuance requirements became stricter or were increasingly restrained. Their bitter interventions, such as signing short-term servitude certificates to prevent perpetual slavery, were banned by 1598 after criticism from figures like Mateus de Couros, who viewed such involvement as misguided.

The Jesuits, previously constrained by limited authority in Japan, experienced a pivotal shift with Pedro Martins’ consecration as bishop in 1592 (Note: Pedro Martins is considered to be the first bishop to reside in Japan. Sebastian de Morais was appointed as the first bishop of the Funai Diocese in 1588, but he died of illness during his voyage to Japan.) and his arrival in Nagasaki in 1596. As the first high-ranking cleric in Japan since Francisco Xavier, Martins acquired the authority to excommunicate Portuguese merchants engaged in the trade of Japanese and Korean slaves. However, the Jesuits’ dependence on financial support from the Captain-major and the bishop’s limited secular authority posed challenges. The Captain-major, as the supreme representative of Portuguese royal authority in Japan, held significant power; opposing him without royal endorsement made excommunication theoretically feasible but practically uncertain.

Ultimately, Martins, alarmed by the social disruption caused by the trade in Japanese and Korean slaves, resolved to pronounce excommunication against human trafficking. After his death, Bishop Cerqueira reinforced this anti-slavery policy, referring the issue, which required secular authority, to the Portuguese crown. After 1598, Bishop Luís de Cerqueira intensified pressure on Spanish and Portuguese authorities to abolish temporary servitude of Japanese and Korean individuals, but the Portuguese slave trade reportedly grew. Despite efforts like Bishop Cerqueira’s lobbying for secular laws and King Philip III’s 1605 decree allowing Japanese slaves in Goa and Cochin to seek justice for illegal enslavement, the trade persisted due to profitability and weak enforcement.

=== Emergence of the Yūkaku system ===
In 1589, Toyotomi Hideyoshi ordered the establishment of the Yanagihara pleasure quarter in Kyoto. Regarded as Japan’s first pleasure quarter, this marked the formalization of the yūkaku system, yet it became a hotbed for human trafficking by procurers. In Hideyoshi-controlled Nagasaki, prostitution was openly practiced, and procurers offered women as commodities to arriving sailors, with human trafficking rampant.

=== Bateren expulsion edict ===
The Bateren Edict, issued by Toyotomi Hideyoshi on June 19, 1587, was a decree ordering the expulsion of Christian missionaries (referred to as "bateren", from the Portuguese padre) from Japan. Promulgated during Hideyoshi's campaign to unify Kyushu, the edict was a response to several perceived threats posed by Christianity.

A memorandum preceding Toyotomi Hideyoshi’s 1587 Bateren Expulsion Edict alleged that Christian missionaries were engaged in trafficking Japanese individuals to China, Korea, and various European territories. However, these accusations were conspicuously absent from the final edict. The edict explicitly distinguished trade from religious concerns, stating: "The purpose of the Black Ships is trade, and that is a different matter. As years and months pass, trade may be carried on in all sorts of articles." Furthermore, it permitted unrestricted entry and return for those who "do not disturb the Law of the Buddhas (merchants, needless to say, and whoever)" from the Kirishitan Country, emphasizing a degree of tolerance towards trade activities and merchants.

Following the edict, Hideyoshi assigned exclusive blame for the Portuguese slave trade to the Jesuit missionaries, ordering their expulsion, seizure of property, and destruction of their religious establishments. Paradoxically, Portuguese merchants—who in reality were the principal actors in the slave trade—were explicitly exempted from any sanctions. This selective condemnation protected Portuguese merchants from accountability despite their principal role in the human trafficking. Moreover, Hideyoshi’s subsequent establishment of licensed pleasure districts in 1589 highlights a moral inconsistency in his policies, tacitly legitimizing the sexual enslavement of women within Japan’s nascent licensed pleasure districts. This hypocrisy is further evidenced by his later complicity in the enslavement of Koreans during the Japanese invasions of Korea, revealing a strategic disregard for the moral implications of enslavement when it served Japanese interests.

The Jesuits established confraternities and the Nagasaki Misericórdia (almshouse), rescuing Japanese slaves, particularly women, from brothels and ships, and aiming to eradicate immoral practices through Christian evangelization. As part of these efforts, missionaries pressed Ōmura Sumitada to release unjustly held captives by leveraging the withholding of confession, promoting ethical conduct and highlighting criticism of the human trafficking practices tolerated in Japan. The fourth article of the Constitutions of Goa prohibited brothel operations, imposing penalties on violators and mandating the liberation of slaves coerced into prostitution, thereby demonstrating the Jesuits’ commitment to moral reform. These consistent efforts to improve slave treatment and rescue women stood in stark contrast to the widespread practice of slave trading in Japan at the time. These efforts stood in stark contrast to the prevalent slave trade in Japan.

His tolerance of abductions and enslavement during the Japanese invasions of Korea (1592–1598), driven by daimyo plundering for profit, further reveals his complicity in human trafficking. While he criticized missionaries and European traders for enslaving Japanese people abroad, his own actions in Korea, which involved much more violent practices, highlight a moral contradiction noted by historians. His condemnation of Christianity lacked ethical consistency, as his primary concern was preventing Japan's humiliation by foreign powers, not opposing slavery itself. Hideyoshi's worldview justified this asymmetry: Japan's actions, including spreading its culture or committing wartime atrocities, were deemed necessary or honorable, while foreign cultural influence or harm to Japan was framed as invasion or degradation. This logic rested on an ethnocentric belief in Japan's divine status and the perceived barbarity of others, exposing a double standard in his policies and rhetoric.

Hideyoshi, despite enslaving Korean slaves for himself, was bothered that his own people were being sold into slavery on Kyushu, that he wrote a letter to Jesuit Vice-Provincial Gaspar Coelho on 24 July 1587 to demand the Portuguese, Siamese (Thai), and Cambodians stop purchasing Japanese and return Japanese slaves who ended up as far as India. The missionaries reasonably argued that suppressing the slave trade was the responsibility of the Japanese government, a point that, while somewhat defensively framed, was not without merit. However, Hideyoshi himself considered the acquisition of slaves a legitimate form of war booty, despite his condemnation of Portuguese involvement. Later, Hideyoshi reneged on compensating Portuguese merchants for returned slaves.

Beyond these moral considerations, Hideyoshi’s edict may have been partly influenced by economic factors. He perceived the Portuguese slave trade and associated dietary practices, such as meat consumption, as contributing to the depletion of Kyushu’s labor force. However, the actual economic impact was likely overstated, as the estimate suggests that, following the arrival of the Portuguese, the total number of Japanese slaves purchased or contracted ranged only from several hundred to a few thousand.

Historian Rômulo da Silva Ehalt argues that human trafficking predated Portuguese arrival in Japan and was widely known across the archipelago, challenging Okamoto Yoshitomo's claim that Hideyoshi, enraged by discovering the slave trade, issued the Bateren Expulsion Order out of moral outrage. Instead, Hideyoshi's interrogatory reveals his primary concerns were economic, such as labor shortages in Kyushu and the influence of Jesuit missionaries, rather than ethical issues. Hideyoshi ordered the return of displaced people—whether trafficked, kidnapped, or voluntarily fled—to their fiefs to stabilize agricultural production, a policy applied nationwide, not just in Kyushu. He also expressed concerns about meat consumption depleting livestock essential for agriculture and war, offering to build a facility for foreigners to consume hunted animals if missionaries couldn't abstain from meat. These actions reflect Hideyoshi's focus on consolidating control and ensuring economic stability.

=== Failed Invasions of Korea ===
When Japan invaded Joseon, Korea in 1592, the Japanese abducted huge numbers of Koreans and sold them into slavery. Hideyoshi’s 1587 Bateren Edict, driven by economic concerns over labor depletion rather than moral objections, as historians like Maki Hidemasa and Romulo Ehalt noted, briefly curtailed slave trades. However, his 1597 second invasion of Korea actively endorsed the slave trade, transforming it into a major industry. Bishop Pedro Martins resolved to excommunicate Portuguese merchants involved in the trade of Japanese and Korean slaves, even for temporary servitude, a stance later strengthened by Bishop Cerqueira.

Contemporary sources describe a “gruesome scenario” where Japanese forces brought crowds of Korean prisoners to islands for sale to Portuguese merchants. The Portuguese merchants, by conducting transactions on these islands, evaded the prohibition in Macau and the excommunication by Bishop Martins. While the Jesuits completely withdrew their desperate measure of regulating the slave trade of Portuguese merchants and made a strong statement that they would not relent in excommunicating merchants outside their jurisdiction, Hideyoshi's policies encouraged the enslavement of Koreans, effectively nullifying the previous restrictions.

Some Korean slaves were bought by the Portuguese and brought back to Portugal from Japan, where they had been among the tens of thousands of Korean prisoners of war transported to Japan during the Japanese invasions of Korea (1592–98). Although Hideyoshi expressed his indignation and outrage at the Portuguese trade in Japanese slaves, he himself was engaging in a mass slave trade of Korean prisoners of war in Japan.

== Edo Period ==
After the 1614 Jesuit expulsion from Japan, Jesuits worked to liberate Japanese and Korean slaves, while Portuguese merchants continued the slave trade. Post-1614, Dutch and English buyers joined the trade possibly due to Portuguese trade bans. Many slaves were sold in Nagasaki and Hirado by Portuguese, Dutch, English, and Spanish traders. From their arrival in Japan until their expulsion, the Portuguese traded an estimated hundred to thousand Japanese slaves.

In 1595, a law was passed by Portugal banning the selling and buying of Chinese and Japanese slaves, but forms of contract and indentured labor persisted alongside the period penal codes' forced labor. Somewhat later, the Edo period penal laws prescribed "non-free labor" for the immediate family of executed criminals in Article 17 of the Gotōke reijō (Tokugawa House Laws), but the practice never became common. The 1711 Gotōke reijō was compiled from over 600 statutes promulgated between 1597 and 1696.

Historians have offered diverse interpretations of how social-economic and military-political processes shaped early modern Japanese society. In the 1930s, Nakamura Kichiji argued that the Tokugawa shogunate reformulated medieval feudalism into a more stable, organized system, emphasizing lord-retainer relationships. Conversely, Araki Moriaki, using documents on familial agricultural households, contended that true feudalism emerged in the Tokugawa era, shifting from a medieval "patriarchal slave system" to a serf-based agricultural economy in the seventeenth century. Recently, Miyagawa Mitsuru, using village sources, agreed medieval society was serf-based but argued Tokugawa society relied on reino, partially independent serflike families. (Note: Complementing these views, Moses Finley’s model of ancient societies (1000–500 BCE) describes a transition from a continuum of status-based societies to ones polarized between slaves and free citizens, with the Roman Empire later reverting to a status continuum, paving the way for medieval societies.)

The system of indentured servitude, termed "nenki bōkō", gradually became prominent during the Edo period (1603–1868), evolving from medieval practices involving "genin" (subordinates). This system was categorized into rural, samurai household, and urban servitude, encompassing forms such as "fudai bōkō" (hereditary or lifelong servitude), "hong kin kaeshi nenki bōkō" (redeemable servitude), "shichimono bōkō" (collateral servitude potentially transitioning to lifelong servitude upon loan default), and standard "nenki bōkō" with fixed terms.

Widespread famine and rural poverty in the early Edo period fueled human trafficking, prompting the Tokugawa shogunate to cap servitude terms at 10 years in 1625. This restriction was lifted in 1698, permitting "einenki bōkō" (extended-term servitude) and "fudai bōkō". By the mid-Edo period, male fudai servitude sales had largely ceased, but human trafficking elements persisted in the servitude of courtesans ("yūjo") and female entertainers ("meshimori onna"). These contracts transferred patriarchal rights to employers, including freedoms to resell, arrange marriages, or manage post-mortem affairs. Legal scholar Kaoru Nakada described these as "body-selling indenture contracts," highlighting their retention of human trafficking characteristics.

Despite legal bans on profit-driven human trafficking, familial sales of relatives into servitude were common and not deemed illegal. Servants, bound by feudal loyalty, lacked legal recourse against masters and often faced workplace violence. Historian Kiyoshi Shimozue notes that nenki bōkō reframed "body selling" as "entering service," masking its exploitative nature. Variants included "shichimono bōkō" (unpaid labor as loan collateral, potentially leading to lifelong servitude), "shichi bōkō" (labor-based debt repayment), "isō shichi bōkō" (partial debt repayment through labor), and short-term contracts like "degae bōkō" (one to one-and-a-half years) or "ikki bōkō" (one-year servitude). Term completion was termed "nenki ga akeru", and participants were called "nenkisha".

Evidence from Nishi-jō village, Mino Province (1773–1825), reveals that 50.3% of boys and 62% of girls aged 11 or older engaged in servitude, underscoring its prevalence. The "nenki bōkō" system, while mitigating overt human trafficking, perpetuated exploitative labor practices under the guise of legitimate contracts.

== Meiji Period ==
As Japan transitioned from centuries of isolation to engaging with foreign powers, the Meiji government recognized the indentured servitude of courtesans and geishas as equivalent to human trafficking. In 1872, following the "Geisho Kaiho Rei" (Courtesan and Geisha Emancipation Order), the Ministry of Finance, led by Inoue Kaoru, responded to a judicial proposal by asserting that limiting the service period of "courtesans, geishas, and others under various designations" was indistinguishable from the American "slave trade."

In the early Meiji period, the "Geisho Kaiho Rei" (Courtesan and Geisha Emancipation Order) proved largely ineffective, resulting in weakened legal constraints on human trafficking. This led to an increase in "wa-bai," a practice where selling one's descendants incurred lighter penalties than selling unrelated individuals. Hidemasa Maki, examining human trafficking from the Meiji to Showa periods, identifies chronic rural poverty and entrenched patriarchal authority as key structural factors fostering the conditions for such practices.

== Before World War II ==
Karayuki-san, literally meaning "Ms. Gone Abroad" were Japanese women who traveled to or were trafficked to East Asia, Southeast Asia, Manchuria, Siberia and as far as San Francisco in the second half of the 19th century and the first half of the 20th century to work as prostitutes, courtesans and geisha. In the 19th and early 20th centuries, there was a network of Japanese prostitutes being trafficked across Asia, in countries such as China, Vietnam, Korea, Singapore and India, in what was then known as the 'Yellow Slave Traffic'.

== World War II ==
In the first half of the Shōwa era, as the Empire of Japan annexed Asian countries, from the late 19th century onwards, archaic institutions including slavery were abolished in those countries. However, during the Second Sino-Japanese War and the Pacific War, the Japanese military used millions of civilians and prisoners of war as forced labor, on projects such as the Burma Railway.

According to a joint study by historians including Zhifen Ju, Mitsuyoshi Himeta, Toru Kubo and Mark Peattie, more than 10 million Chinese civilians were mobilized by the Kōa-in (East Asia Development Board) for forced labour. According to the Japanese military's own record, nearly 25% of 140,000 Allied POWs died while interned in Japanese prison camps where they were forced to work (U.S. POWs died at a rate of 27%). More than 100,000 civilians and POWs died in the construction of the Burma Railway. The U.S. Library of Congress estimates that in Java, between 4 and 10 million romusha (Japanese: "manual laborer"), were forced to work by the Japanese military. About 270,000 of these Javanese laborers were sent to the Outer Islands and other Japanese-held areas in South East Asia. Only 52,000 were repatriated to Java.

During World War II the Japanese empire used various types of foreign labor from its colonies, Korea and Taiwan. Japan mobilized its colonial labor within the same legal framework that was applied to the Japanese. There were different procedures for mobilizing labor. The method used first, in 1939 was the recruitment by private companies under government supervision. In 1942 it was introduced the official mediation method, where the government was more directly involved. The outright conscription was applied from 1944 to 1945.

According to the Korean historians, approximately 670,000 Koreans, were conscripted into labor from 1944 to 1945 by the National Mobilization Law. About 670,000 of them were taken to Japan, where about 60,000 died between 1939 and 1945 due mostly to exhaustion or poor working conditions. Many of those taken to Karafuto Prefecture (modern-day Sakhalin) were trapped there at the end of the war, stripped of their nationality and denied repatriation by Japan; they became known as the Sakhalin Koreans. The total deaths of Korean forced laborers in Korea and Manchuria for those years is estimated to be between 270,000 and 810,000.

Since the end of the Second World War, numerous people have filed lawsuits against the state and/or private companies in Japan, seeking compensation based on suffering as the result of forced labor. The plaintiffs had encountered many legal barriers to be awarded damages, including: sovereign immunity; statutes of limitations; and waiver of claims under the San Francisco Peace Treaty.

According to the United States House of Representatives House Resolution 121, as many as 200,000 "comfort women" mostly from Korea and China, and some other countries and territories such as the Philippines, Taiwan, French Indochina (Vietnam),Burma, the Dutch East Indies, Netherlands, and Australia were forced into sexual slavery during World War II to satisfy Japanese Imperial Army and Navy members. Many of these women — particularly the Dutch and Australian women — were also used for hard physical labour, forced to work arduous tasks in the fields and roads such as digging graves, building roads and hoeing hard soil, in hellish heat while on starvation rations. While apologies have been handed out by the Japanese government and government politicians, including the Asian Women's fund, which grants donated financial compensations to former comfort women, the Japanese government has also worked to downplay its use of comfort women in recent times, claiming that all compensations for its war conduct were resolved with post-war treaties such as the Treaty of San Francisco, and, for example, asking the mayor of Palisades Park, New Jersey to take down a memorial in memory of the women.

== Consequence ==
In 2018, South Korea's Supreme Court ruled that Japanese companies, including Mitsubishi Heavy Industries, owed compensation to Korean workers for forced labor during the Japanese colonial period. However, a later decision by the Seoul Central District Court created confusion by dismissing a case against Japanese firms, citing the 1965 Agreement on the Settlement of Problems concerning Property and Claims and on Economic Cooperation, which Japan argues settled the matter of compensation. This legal ambiguity has led to diplomatic tensions, affecting trade and security cooperation between the two countries.

In 2021, UNESCO reprimanded Japan for insufficient information about the history of forced labor at its industrial heritage sites, including Hashima Island (also known as "Battleship Island"), which is part of the Sites of Japan's Meiji Industrial Revolution. UNESCO highlighted Japan's failure to adequately acknowledge the use of Korean forced labor at these sites during World War II. Despite being a UNESCO World Heritage Site, Hashima Island and other locations like the Miike coal mine have a history of forced labor, including Korean laborers and, before that, convict labor.

== See also ==
- Karayuki-san
- History of slavery in Asia
- Slavery in China
- Slavery in Korea

== Bibliography ==
- Fischer-Tiné, Harald (June 2003). "'White women degrading themselves to the lowest depths' : European networks of prostitution and colonial anxieties in British India and Ceylon ca. 1880–1914". The Indian Economic & Social History Review. 40 (2): 163–190. doi:10.1177/001946460304000202. ISSN 0019-4646. S2CID 146273713.
- Ehalt, Rômulo da Silva (2018). Jesuits and the problem of slavery in early modern Japan (PDF) (PhD thesis). Tokyo University of Foreign Studies. doi:10.15026/91848.
- Ehalt, Rômulo (2023). "Geninka and Slavery: Jesuit Casuistry and Tokugawa Legislation on Japanese Bondage (1590s–1620s)" (PDF). Itinerario. 47 (3): 342–356. doi:10.1017/S0165115323000256.
