= North Korean Slaves =

- Countries of origin: Singapore; United Kingdom
- Original language: English

Production
- Producer: MAKE Productions Pte Ltd
- Running time: 45 minutes

Original release
- Network: Channel NewsAsia
- Release: March 22, 2016

North Korean Slaves is a 2016 Singaporean-British documentary television film. Produced by MAKE Productions for Singapore's Channel NewsAsia and United Kingdom's Channel 4, it investigates the North Korean men who are used like slaves in a coal mine in the jungle of Sarawak, Malaysia, earning money to keep the Supreme Leader Kim Jong-un and the people around him in power. Aired on Channel NewsAsia's Undercover Asia 3 documentary series in March 2016, it received a nomination for Best Current Affairs Programme at the 21st Asian Television Awards in 2016.

A related documentary focusing on the North Korean slaves across Europe, also produced by MAKE Productions, was aired on Channel 4's Dispatches documentary series titled Brexit: Who'll Do Your Job Now? on August 8, 2016.

== See also ==
- Slavery in Korea
