= Francisco Cabral (Jesuit) =

16th century Portuguese Jesuit priest and missionary in Japan

The Reverend Francisco Cabral SJ
- Born: 1529; Diocese of Guarda, Kingdom of Portugal
- Died: 16 April 1609 (aged 79-80); Goa, Portuguese India
- Occupation: Jesuit priest
- Known for: Missionary in Japan

Francisco Cabral, SJ (1529 - 1609) was a Portuguese Jesuit priest and missionary in Japan.

== Early life ==
Cabral was born in the castle of Covilhā, Diocese of Guarda, Portugal in 1529. He entered the Society of Jesus in 1554.

== Work in Japan ==
Cabral arrived in Japan in the spring of 1570 to serve as Superior of the Jesuit Japan Mission.

Cabral implemented several changes to refocus the Japan mission. He forbade the local Jesuit missionaries from wearing the orange silk robes worn by Buddhist priests, a practice that had begun under Francis Xavier so that missionaries would be taken more seriously by locals. Cabral viewed these garments as a cape used by the devil while infiltrating the mission, and insisted that priests wear the traditional black cassock. He also stopped observing Japanese dietary customs, had fewer missionaries learn the Japanese language, and rejected other forms of cultural accommodation to the Japanese. Cabral also resisted the training of Japanese priests, believing that they may come to despise Europeans. These policies led to a decline in morale among local missionaries.

Church membership in Japan grew to 130,000 during Cabral's leadership, as a number of daimyo converted to Christianity, some with the intention of having better trade conditions with Macau. However, the isolated Jesuit mission lacked funding. Cabral believed that the mission had been abandoned by God due to the sins of its members, and by 1576 had asked the General of the Society to let him return to Europe.

A number of Jesuits, including the canonical Visitor to the Eastern Missions Alessandro Valignano and Father Gnecchi-Soldo Organtino, were opposed to Cabral's policies and openly resisted them. Valignano opened a school for the training of lay ministers in 1580 over Cabral's objections. Valignano formally criticized Cabral in a letter to the General in October 1580; Cabral later asked Valignano to relieve him of his post as Superior, and left Japan in 1581, being replaced by Gaspar Coelho. Following his departure from Japan, Cabral advised the General that Japan should be evangelized through assertion of Jesuit identity and profound spiritual life.

Cabral also supported the role of military force in evangelization, proposing in 1584 a Spanish, Portuguese and Japanese invasion of China which never realized.

== Later life ==
Cabral served as the Rector of the Colégio de São Paulo in Goa, and later as the Jesuit Visitor to India. He died in Goa in 1609.
