= Gaspar Coelho =

Portuguese Jesuit missionary

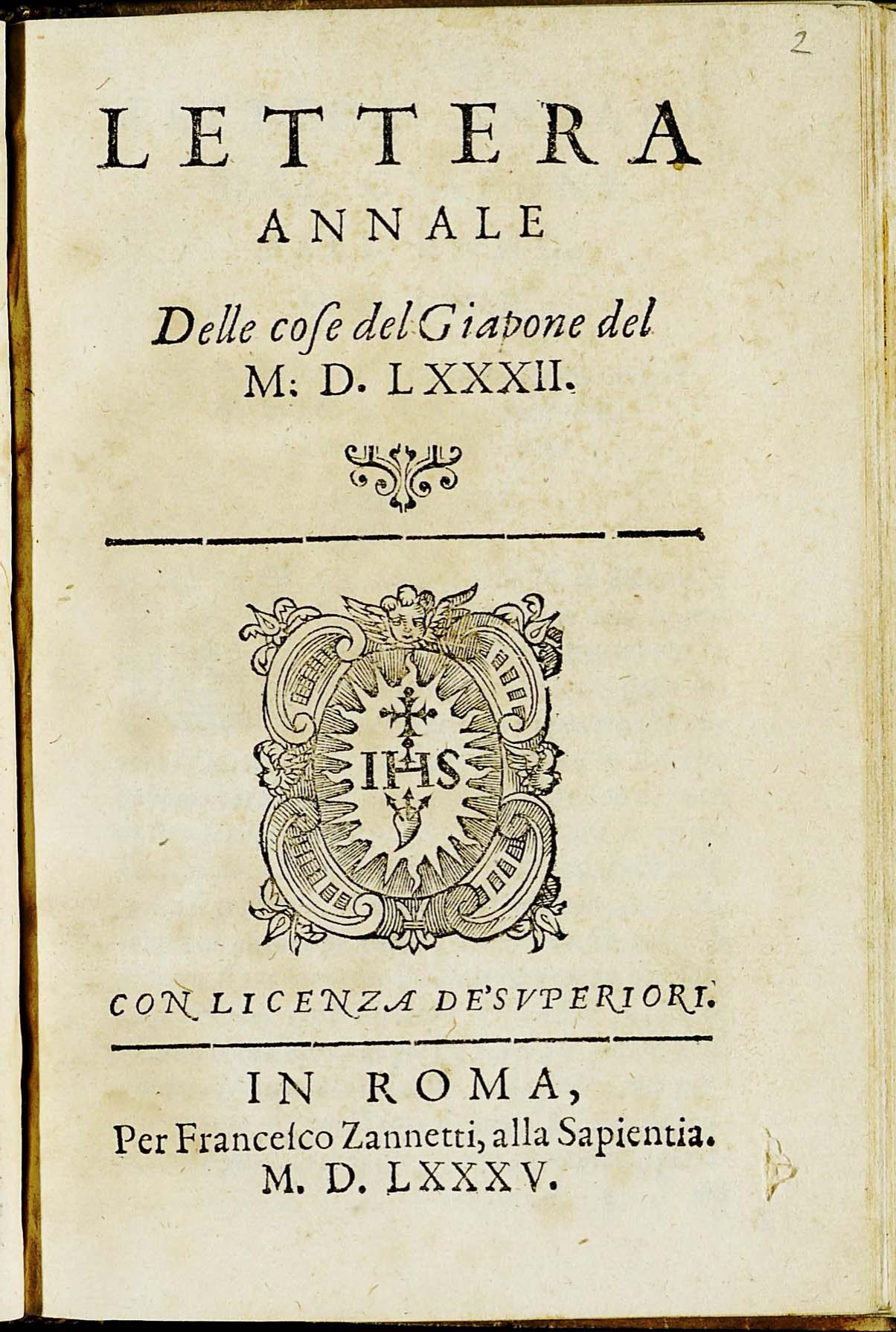
- Front page of the 1582 Jesuit report on Japan, attributed to Gaspar Coelho
- Born: c. 1529; Porto, Portugal
- Died: 1590
- Other name: Gasparo Coeglio
- Occupation: Jesuit missionary
- Known for: Superior of the Jesuit mission in Japan

Gaspar Coelho (c. 1529 – 1590) was a Portuguese Jesuit missionary. He replaced Francisco Cabral as the Superior and Vice-Provincial of the Jesuit mission in Japan during the late 16th century. He catalysed the disfavour of Toyotomi Hideyoshi against the Jesuit mission in Japan in 1587.

== Early life ==
Coelho was born in Porto, Portugal, around 1529. He joined the Society of Jesus in Goa in 1556, and only four years later, was chosen to accompany the Society's highest Asian official, Antonio de Quadros, on a tour of India.

== Work in Japan ==
Coelho first arrived in Japan around 1570, at the invitation of Francisco Cabral. Coelho and Cabral pursued a strategy of attempting to convert Buddhists and destroy Buddhist and Shinto temples in Japan's Christian domains, such as the Ōmura Domain, where the Jesuits supported Ōmura Sumitada in his defeat of Saigō Sumitaka. During the final years of Sumitada's reign, Coelho encouraged a wave of Buddhist and Shinto temple destruction in the domain. He also convinced Sumitada to forcefully convert all of his subjects to Christianity. Coelho also ministered to the Arima clan, presiding over Arima Yoshisada's baptism in 1576.

Coelho became Superior of the Japan mission in September 1581, and was left in charge of the mission following Alessandro Valignano's departure in February 1582. Following his appointment as superior, Coelho commissioned the building of a fusta warship for the Jesuits in Nagasaki, financed by local Portuguese merchants and crewed by Japanese Christians.

Coelho supported Arima Harunobu in a 1584 victory in Shimabara against Ryūzōji Takanobu, who had threatened to crucify Coelho and give the port of Nagasaki to the soldiers of the Ryūzōji army. He lobbied other Christian samurai, as well as Christians in the Spanish Philippines, to support the Arima against the Ryūzōji.

=== Relationship with Toyotomi Hideyoshi ===
Toyotomi Hideyoshi unified Japan through a nine-year military campaign from 1582 to 1591. Jesuit missionaries first arrived in Osaka, Hideyoshi's capital, in 1583, and Hideyoshi's court at Osaka Castle thereafter contained many Japanese Christians, including many women who became interested in the religion.

Coelho visited Hideyoshi in Osaka in 1586. At this meeting, Hideyoshi asked Coelho to secure him two Portuguese ships for the invasion of Korea and China; Coelho not only agreed to the deal, but also suggested that the Society could acquire more troops from the Portuguese, and offered to rally Christian daimyo against the Shimazu clan. This made Hideyoshi aware that Coelho may potentially create an axis of Christian domains with allegiance to a foreign religion. Nevertheless, at the urging of his first wife, who had strong Christian sympathies, Hideyoshi issued permission letters to Coelho allowing Jesuit priests to reside freely in Japan; Hideyoshi also granted land near Osaka Castle to Coelho. The permissions granted to Jesuits were superior to those granted to Buddhists at the time.

Hideyoshi visited Hakata in July 1587 following his successful conquest of Kyushu, and Coelho entertained Hideyoshi aboard his ship. After consulting with some of his advisors, Hideyoshi had Coelho roused in the middle of the night and asked a series of questions concerning the intentions of the mission. Coelho responded as best he could, but the next morning Hideyoshi issued an edict ordering all Jesuits to leave Japan within twenty days. While they were ultimately given more time for the Great Ship to arrive, Hideyoshi proceeded to ban Christian symbols and ordered Japanese Christians to recant on pain of death. Coelho then unsuccessfully attempted to procure arms from Goa, Macau and Manila in order to arm the Christian lords against Hideyoshi. Hideyoshi never enforced the edict as he was fearful of disrupting trade links with Portugal; Christianity re-emerged in his court in the 1590s.

Coelho died in 1590.
