= Hinin =

Ancient Japanese outcast social class

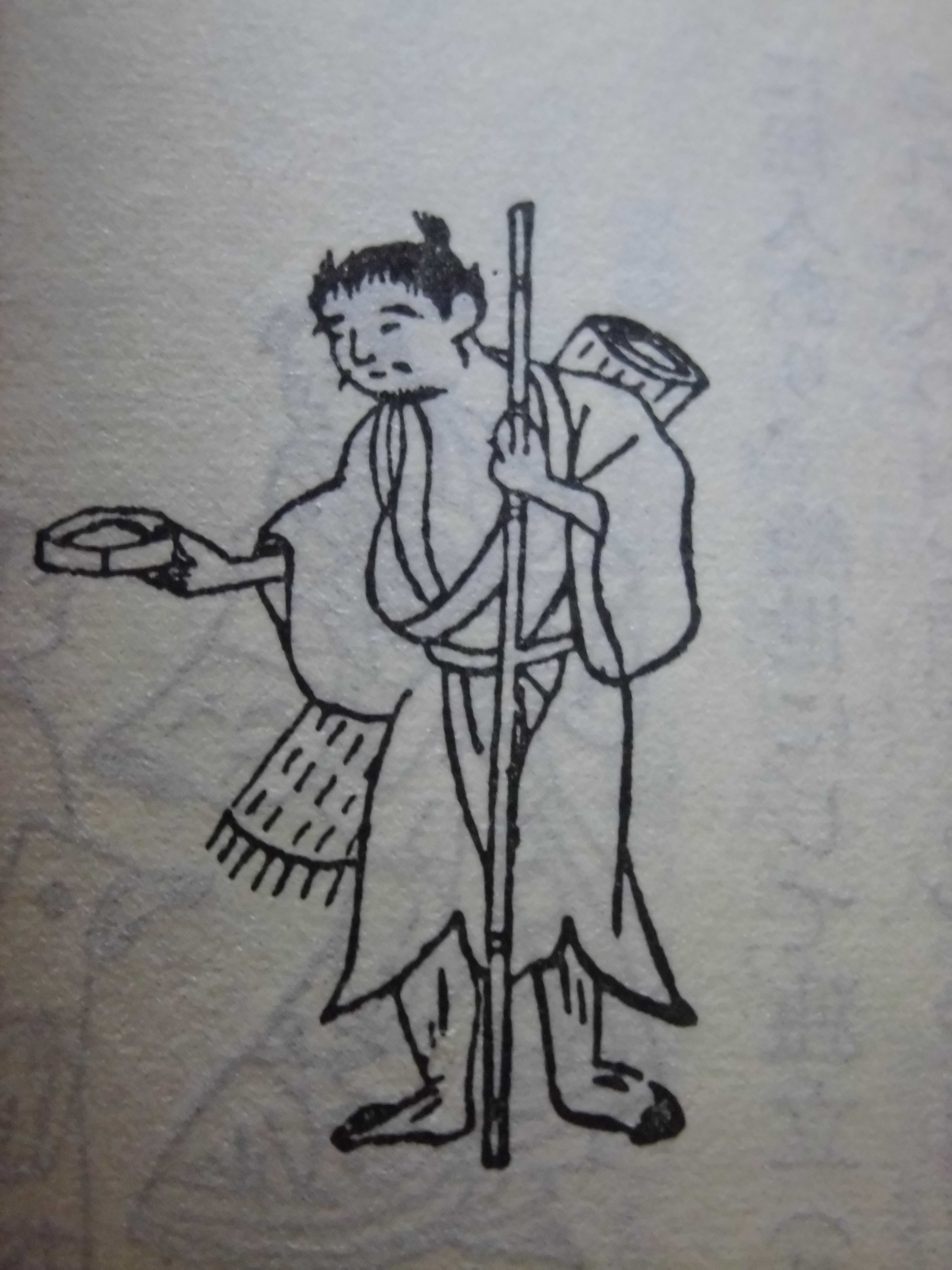
In Edo society, beggars belonged to the Hi-nin class.

Hi-nin (kanji: 非人, hiragana: ひにん; lit. 'non-human') was an outcast group (burakumin) in ancient Japan, more specifically the Edo period of Japanese history (1603–1868). Hinin and Eta (穢多, えた) consisted of the lowest social classes in ancient Japan, but were not considered part of the social hierarchy. Hinin were forced to do "polluting" activities such as begging, street performing, and burying the bodies of people who had been executed.

Eta directly translates to "polluted ones" and was closely intertwined with the Hinin social class. Both phrases were used for those deemed to be separate from society with a few minor distinctions between them. The occupations of those who were called Eta were mostly skinning animals and tanning. These jobs were associated with sinning due to the heavy practice of Buddhism and Shinto in Edo Japan, thus those who did these jobs were considered to be filled with sin and therefore "polluted."

== History ==
Hinin could be adopted by poor commoners and commoners having committed crimes. The Hinin status was hereditary. Unlike Eta, it was possible for the offspring of hinin to rejoin the commoner class, as long as they met some requirements.

In 1871, after the Meiji Restoration, the Hinin as an identity was legally abolished. However, Hinin were still officially discriminated against by the authorities. They were called "new commoners" (新平民 (しんへいみん)), which indicated that they had once been members of the lowest class in the past. After World War II, anti-discrimination regulations were enforced in Japan, but discrimination towards the offspring of Hinin and Eta still exist in Japanese society today.

== Types of Hinin ==
The Hinin themselves were split into two separate categories that were based on their previous status as citizens.

No-hinin (野非人(のひにん)) were those who resemble today's current status of the homeless. This group consisted of people who could not pay taxes because of disease or other reasons. No-hinin lived in specific areas due to society pushing them out, such as under bridges or near riverbanks.

Kakae-hinin (抱非人(かかえひにん)) was a category that had two subsets of people. Hinin-teka (非人手下(ひにんてか)) were those who were given the class distinction for committing a crime against the “kujigata-osamegaki” (公事方御定書(くじがたおさめがき)), the law code of Edo Japan. The other subset were those who inherited the class distinction through their parents. People would be given the Hinin-teka title if they, for example, committed extramarital acts within their family; were a survivor of an attempted collective couple suicide; were a survivor of an attempted collective suicide with their housemaid; were under 15 year old No-hinins and caught stealing.

== Returning to society ==
The "kae-hinin" subset class were unique in that they were able to buy their way back into society and get the “heimin" (平民（へいみん）) class status if some money has been paid by their family or relatives. The process is similar to the concept of bail nowadays.

== Occupation ==
The hinin’s occupations were Monogoi 物乞い (ものごい, Monomorai 物貰い（ものもらい, which is trying to get something from other persons, and Yu-gei 遊芸（ゆうげい, which means they will perform something for an audience. Only Hinin were allowed to be Monogoi. They did Kadoduke 門付け（かどづけ） which is cleaning the town. They sought and re-used discarded paper, performed cremations, cared for the sick, and they worked in prisons.
