= Slavery in Korea =

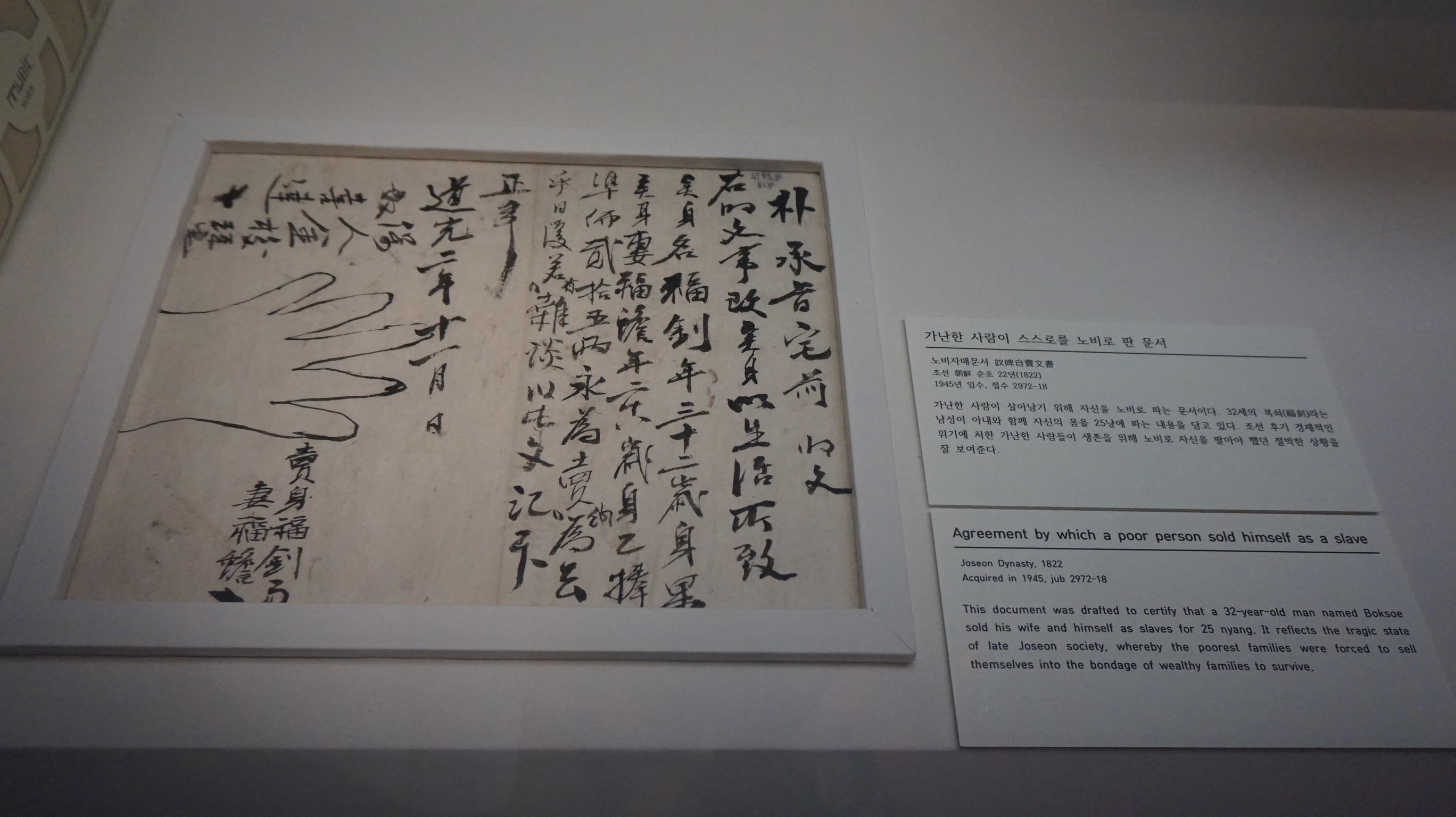
Agreement by which a poor man sold himself and his wife as slaves during the Joseon Dynasty, 1822, for 25 nyang.

Slavery in Korea existed in various forms from its origins in antiquity over 2,000 years ago to its gradual abolition in the late Joseon period, beginning in the 18th century and culminating in 1894.

The nature of the nobi system is widely debated, with scholars agreeing that it constituted a form of serfdom until at least the Goryeo period (ca 918–1392) but disagreeing whether it constituted slavery, serfdom, or both during the Joseon period (1392-1897). In Korean, slave is translated as 'noye' which were a class of people with no legal rights unlike the 'nobi' who had the right to private property, subsistence wages, and were contractually obligated through debt. The Joseon dynasty was a stratified society mainly ruled by the yangban class, in which wealth was measured by ownership of land and nobi. During this period, the nobi of the majority "non-resident" group owned land, and some even owned nobi contracts, thus complicating the definition of 'slavery' as slaves in the international context usually did not have such legal rights.

Slavery was not widespread during the Three Kingdoms and Unified Silla periods. Slaves/serfs comprised no more than 10 percent of the population before the Joseon period. The nobi system was a major institution during the Joseon period and an important part of the economy. The nobi system peaked between the 15th and 17th centuries and then declined in the 18th and 19th centuries. The nobi comprised at least 30 percent of the population between the 15th and 17th centuries. They were much more numerous in the southern half of the country, where their population possibly reached 40 percent, and much less numerous in the northern half of the country, where their status was not hereditary. The nobi population was substantial in the capital, Seoul, where 1729 out of 2374, or 73 percent, were registered as nobi in a hojeok from 1663. The term meoseum, or "hired servant", was used instead of the term nobi in the northern half of the country. The Joseon dynasty undermined the nobi system in 1731, 1744, 1783, and 1801. The nobi population declined to 1.5% by 1858. The nobi system was officially abolished in 1894 but vestiges of it remained until the mid-20th century.

In modern South Korea, slavery, or more generally referred to as human trafficking, is illegal, although it is estimated that as of 2018 there are about 99,000 slaves (about 0.195% of the population) in existence, according to the Global Slavery Index.

In North Korea, slavery is still practiced by the country's regime. According to the 2023 Global Slavery Index, North Korea has the highest estimated prevalence of modern slavery in the world: An estimated 2,696,000 people, or over 10% of the population, were living in modern slavery conditions in 2021.

== Terminology ==
The term nobi is often translated as "slave", "serf" or "servant" into English. However, it is debated what translation is most appropriate due to historical facts and because existing English words are loaded with Western connotations that come with implications for comparative history. It appears that most scholars prefer no translation at all and just use the term nobi. According to Kichung Kim: "Among Korean scholars of the nobi there is yet no consensus as to the English word most equivalent to the Korean word nobi."

== History ==
Slavery in Korea existed since before the Three Kingdoms of Korea period, approximately 2,000 years ago. The earliest record of slavery in Korea is the Eight Prohibitions of Old Joseon, recorded in the Records of the Three Kingdoms. Slavery or serfdom has been described as "very important in medieval Korea, probably more important than in any other East Asian country, but by the 16th century, population growth was making [it] unnecessary". Korean slavery would be more equivalent to European serfdom except Korean slaves or 'nobi' technically had more legal rights than European serfs.

Slavery fully developed during the Three Kingdoms of Korea period. The institution of slavery likely weakened when Silla unified the Korean Peninsula. Slaves were freed on a large scale in 956 by the Goryeo dynasty. Gwangjong of Goryeo proclaimed the Slave and Land Act, an act that "deprived nobles of much of their manpower in the form of slaves and purged the old nobility, the meritorious subjects and their offspring and military lineages in great numbers". Information about slavery in the middle Goryeo period is nonexistent. Yi Ŭimin was a slave who became the most powerful man in Korea. Slavery intensified and many slave rebellions occurred at the end of the Goryeo dynasty.

=== Early Joseon period ===
Joseon class system
Class	Hangul	Hanja	Status
Yangban	양반	兩班	aristocratic class
Chungin	중인	中人	middle class
Sangmin	상민	常民	common people
Ch'ŏnmin	천민	賤民	lowborn people (nobi, paekchŏng, mudang, kisaeng, namsadang, etc.)

Slaves were freed on a large scale at the beginning of the Joseon dynasty. In the Joseon period, members of the slave class were known as nobi. The nobi were socially indistinct from freemen (i.e., the middle and common classes) other than the ruling yangban class, and some possessed property rights, legal entities and civil rights. Hence, some scholars argue that it is inappropriate to call them "slaves", while some scholars describe them as serfs. The Korean word for a slave in the Western sense is noye, not nobi. Some nobi owned their own nobi. According to Bok Rae Kim: "In summary, on the economic, judicial and socio-cultural levels, it is evident that the nobis of the [Joseon] era were not 'socially dead' and that the nobi system at its zenith between the fifteenth and seventeenth centuries may be defined as 'a serfdom developed under slavery'."

Household nobi served as personal retainers and domestic servants, and most received a monthly salary that could be supplemented by earnings gained outside regular working hours. Out-resident nobi resided at a distance and were little different from tenant farmers or commoners. They were registered officially as independent family units and possessed their own houses, families, land, and fortunes. Out-resident nobi were far more numerous than household nobi. In the chakkae system, nobi were assigned two pieces of agricultural land, with the resulting produce from the first land paid to the master, and the produce from the second land kept by the nobi to consume or sell. In order to gain freedom, nobi could purchase it, earn it through military service, or receive it as a favor from the government. The nobi population could fluctuate up to about one-third of the population, but on average the nobi made up about 10% of the total population.

The hierarchical relationship between yangban master and nobi was believed to be equivalent to the Confucian hierarchical relationship between ruler and subject, or father and son. Nobi were considered an extension of the master's own body, and an ideology based on patronage and mutual obligation developed. The Annals of King Taejong stated: "The nobi is also a human being like us; therefore, it is reasonable to treat him generously" and "In our country, we love our nobis like a part of our body."

In 1426, Sejong the Great enacted a law that granted government nobi women 100 days of maternity leave after childbirth, which, in 1430, was lengthened by one month before childbirth. In 1434, Sejong also granted the husbands 30 days of paternity leave.

=== Japanese and Portuguese slave trade ===
During the 1592–1598 Imjin War, Korean slaves were taken from Korea to Japan, with the first shipment being taken in October 1592. The topic of Japan's role in Korean slavery is controversial, with scholars of both Japan and Korea accused of intentionally over or underestimating the number of slaves. The number itself is thus uncertain, with figures ranging from tens of thousands to over 100,000. 100,000 people was around 1% of the total population of Korea at the time.

However, the taking of slaves was not done exclusively by Japan; Portuguese slave ships took slaves from Korea, and Korean defectors and commoners also participated in the trade. The Japanese city of Nagasaki became a hub for Korean slavery. There became such an abundance of Korean slaves there that the prices of slaves dropped sharply. The legal status of these slaves was different from those before the Imjin War; they were often deprived of any legal rights by their Japanese captors. Around one to two thousand Korean slaves were sold to the Portuguese per year between 1592 and 1597.

Korea sent five diplomatic missions (Joseon Tongsinsa) to Japan, during which they asked to retrieve slaves. These missions happened in 1607, 1616, 1624, 1636, and 1643. A number of slaves were returned or escaped on several occasions, with the Veritable Records of the Joseon Dynasty recording the following figures:

# Korean slaves who returned to Korea per year
Year	# repatriated slaves
1600	481
1601	251
1602	229
1603	199
1605	4390
1606	120
1607	1240
1608	6
1613	1
1617	346
1625	146
1630	9
1643	14

Most slaves were stranded in Japan, with the famous example of Korean samurai Wakita Naokata (Kim Yŏ-ch'ŏl). Most worked as farmers, and some as craftsman, for Japanese masters. Women were in high demand, and pressed into working in brothels. In some rare cases, Korean slaves worked as interpreters, with an ethnic Korean interpreter of English named "Miguel" attested to in Hirado. There are records of thousands of baptisms performed on them by the Portuguese, with some going on to convert other Korean slaves. Some were made saints in the 17th-century (205 Martyrs of Japan).

Some slaves were sent to other places, including to Portuguese Macau. Correspondingly, there is a record of a slave Miguel Carvalho who was born to a Korean mother in Macau in 1593. He is possibly the first or among the first Macanese-Korean people. A community of several thousand Korean slaves formed near the Church of Saint Paul. Other slaves were sent to Manila in the Spanish Philippines, at least one to Goa, an António Corea was taken to Florence and Rome, and likely one to Ambon Island, where he was killed in the 1623 Amboyna massacre. Korean forced prostitutes were known to have been purchased and shipped abroad. The Portuguese purchase of Korean slaves peaked in 1598, as their price was so cheap. They were forced into cramped ships, with many starving to death.

The international trade of Korean slaves declined shortly after the end of the Japanese invasions due to a number of factors. The Nagasaki government protested slavery and the export of people from Japan in general, and the Catholic Church began excommunicating people who traded slaves in Japan. On January 26, 1607, King Philip II finally succeeded in compelling Goa to abide by restrictions on the slave trade. The international flow of slaves from Japan slowed to a near halt around this time, although slave labor continued to be used.

=== Late Joseon period and decline ===
According to Arnold Henry Savage Landor, who traveled to Korea in 1890 and documented his journey: "Slavery in Corea, even when it existed, was, however, always of a very mild form. The women were mostly employed as servants about the house, while the man tilled the ground, but in neither case was rough dealing the rule, and, far less, ill-treatment. They were, too, well fed and clothed; so much so, that many people used to sell themselves in order to acquire a comfortable living. In time of famine this must have very often occurred, and many families whose ancestors under such circumstances stood by the nobles and rich people are even to the present moment supported by them, though no longer as slaves, but rather as retainers and servants."

The nobi system declined in the 18th and 19th centuries. Since the outset of the Joseon dynasty and especially beginning in the 17th century, there was harsh criticism among prominent thinkers in Korea about the nobi system. Even within the Joseon government, there were indications of a shift in attitude toward the nobi. King Yeongjo implemented a policy of gradual emancipation in 1775, and he and his successor King Jeongjo made many proposals and developments that lessened the burden on nobi, which led to the emancipation of the vast majority of government nobi in 1801. In addition, population growth, numerous escaped slaves, growing commercialization of agriculture, and the rise of the independent small farmer class contributed to the decline in the number of nobi to about 1.5% of the total population by 1858. The hereditary nobi system was officially abolished around 1886 and 1887, and the rest of the nobi system was abolished with the Gabo Reform of 1894. However, the nobi system lingered in some parts of the country through the Japanese period from 1910 to 1945 until the Korean War in 1950.

== Modern slavery ==
During Japanese rule over Korea around World War II, some Koreans were used in forced labor by the Japanese, in conditions which have been compared to slavery. These included women forced into sexual slavery by the Imperial Japanese Army before and during World War II, known as "comfort women".

=== North Korea ===
According to the 2023 Global Slavery Index, an estimated 2,696,000 people in North Korea, or 104.6 per 1,000 people, experienced modern slavery in 2021, giving North Korea the highest estimated prevalence in the world. Walk Free reports that the vast majority of modern slavery in North Korea consists of state-imposed forced labour. The organization reports that forced labour is used for economic development, labour discipline and as punishment for expressing political views, and that adults and children have been required to perform unpaid communal labour in agriculture, road construction and other construction work.

Revenue generated by North Korean overseas workers has also contributed to the country's nuclear weapons and ballistic missile programs.

=== South Korea ===
In media reports from 2015, the abuse and exploitation of people with disabilities on rural island salt farms in Sinan County has been described as slavery.

In terms of people in modern slavery in absolute numbers South Korea ranked 137th in the 2018 Global Slavery Index, with some 99,000 people estimated to be enslaved.

== See also ==
- History of slavery in Asia
- Slavery in Japan
