= Libbey High School =

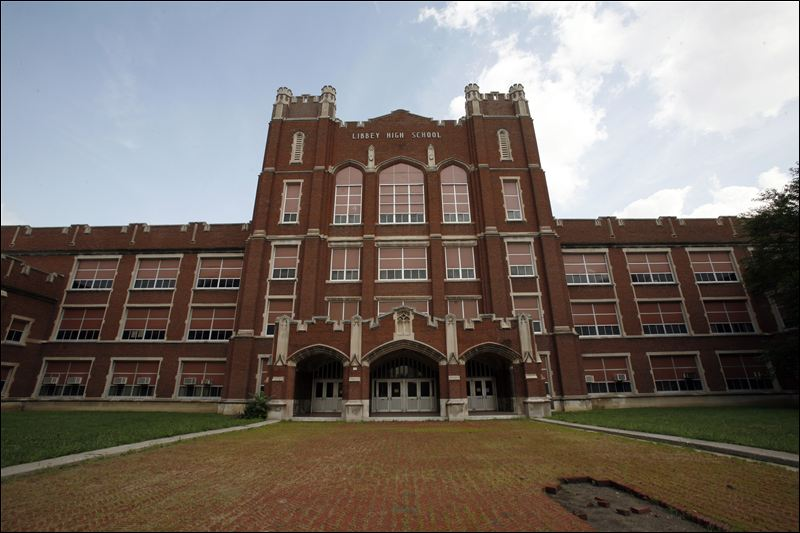

Location
- 1250 Edward Drummond Libbey Way; Toledo, (Lucas County), Ohio 43609; United States; 41°38′8″N 83°34′17″W

Information
- Type: Public, Coeducational high school
- Motto: "There's More To Being A Cowboy Than Just Wearing Boots"
- Established: 1923
- Closed: 2010
- School district: Toledo City School District
- Superintendent: Jerome Pecko
- Grades: 9-12
- Colors: Blue & Gold
- Athletics conference: Toledo City League
- Team name: Cowboys
- Accreditation: North Central Association of Colleges and Schools
- Website: www.tps.org

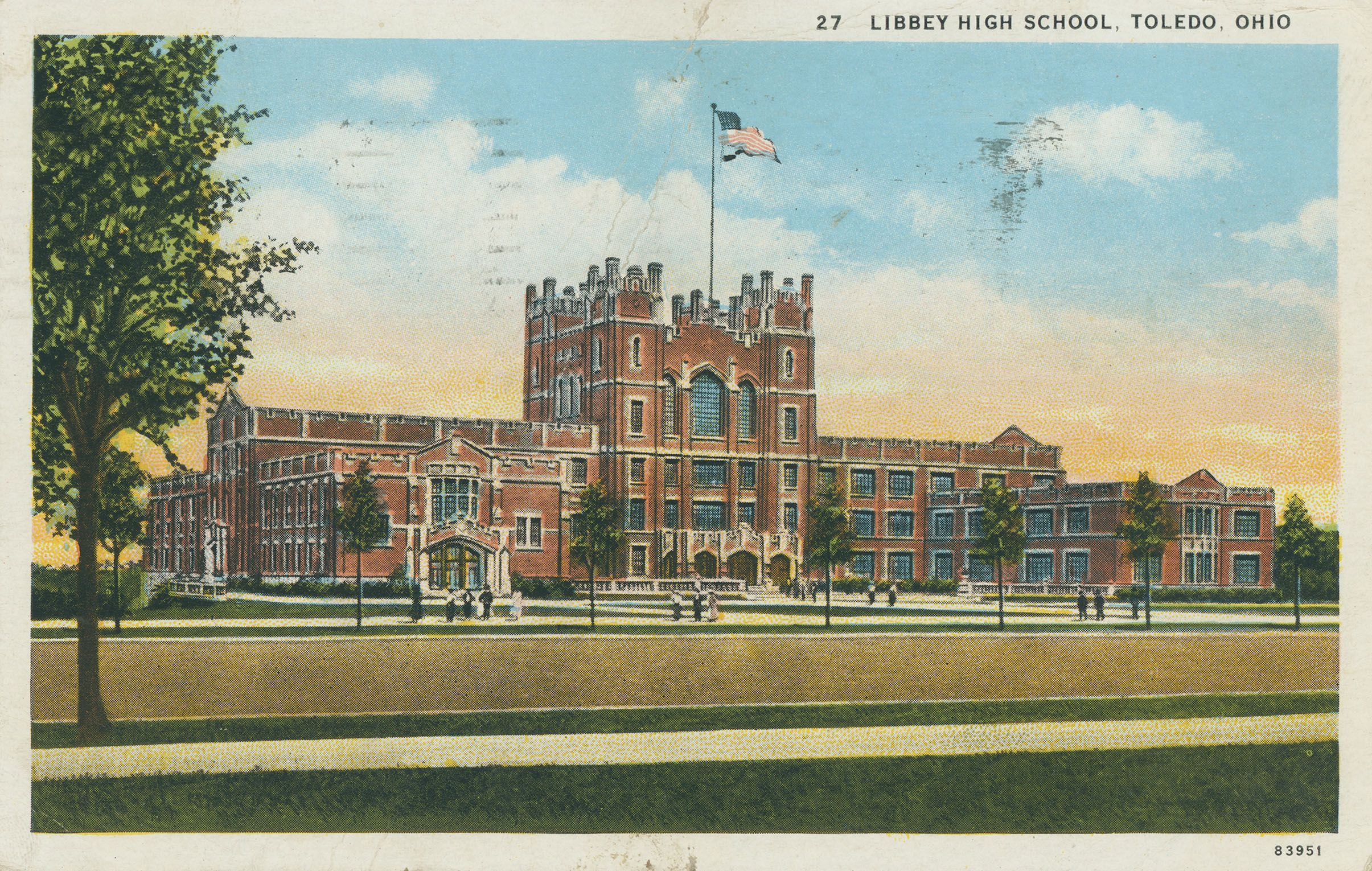
A vintage postcard of Libbey High School in Toledo, Ohio, 1930

Edward Drummond Libbey High School was a public high school building located on the south side of Toledo, Ohio which held classes from 1923 until 2010. It is part of Toledo Public Schools and contained the Smart Academy and Humanities Academy. Libbey was named after Edward Drummond Libbey, the founder of the Toledo Art Museum and Libbey Glass. Edwin Gee was the building's architect.

The Libbey Cowboys were founding members of the Toledo City League from 1926 until the school closed. Their colors were royal blue and gold. The Cowboys were most famous for their boys basketball teams and had a strong basketball rivalry with Scott High School in Toledo. Prior to the Shoe Bowl championship for the City League football title, Libbey had an annual Thanksgiving Day football game with Woodward High School from 1923 to 1932, and with DeVilbiss High School from 1933 to 1963.

== Fate of Libbey ==
Libbey High School had been rumored to be potentially closing since the 1980s, but was recommended to stay open by the school district each time the issue was brought up. In 1991, TPS decided to close two high schools that were to be chosen from a list of Libbey, DeVilbiss and Macomber-Whitney high schools. Libbey was spared while DeVilbiss and Macomber-Whitney were shuttered.

In April 2009, Libbey High School's student council president had strong words for administrators and school board members with regard to saving their school. The proposal to eventually send some Libbey neighborhood students to Scott, Bowsher, and Waite high schools is "segregation of different populations and is racist", they claimed. Libbey always had been the "unwanted stepchild" of Toledo Public Schools and 'their positive news is always overshadowed by the negative", students added. Libbey was left open for the 2009–10 school year, but the issue of closing the school was brought up again in March 2010. After a failed levy early in May, Toledo Public Schools ultimately voted 3–2 in favor of closing the school at the end of the 2009–10 school year. The board had originally voted to keep Libbey open, but called a re-vote after board member Brenda Hill admitted she accidentally voted the wrong way. The final class of 2010 graduated on June 3 in the fieldhouse. All remaining Libbey students were divided geographically, between Scott, Bowsher, Waite and especially Rossford and Central Catholic High Schools.

On July 15, 2011, Libbey High School was vetted by the Ohio Historic Site Preservation Board for nomination to the National Register of Historic Places.

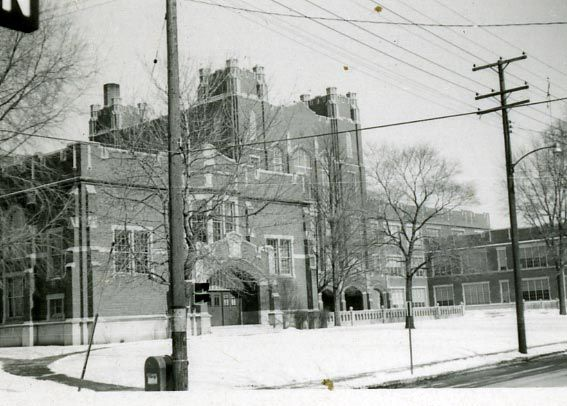
Lucas County Auditor's Photograph of Libbey High School, 1965

The demolition of the building began in January 2012.

== Ohio High School Athletic Association State Championships ==
- Boys Golf - 1935, 1939
- Boys Track and Field – 1972
- Girls Basketball - 1981

== Toledo City League Championships ==
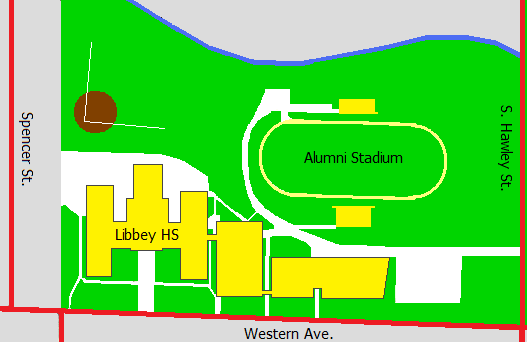
A map of the campus

- Baseball:
- Boys Basketball: 1930–31, 1939-40*, 1940–41, 1954–55, 1965–66, 1968–69, 1969–70, 1999–00, 2006–07, 2007–08
- Boys Cross Country: 1959, 1960, 1961, 1966, 1967
- Girls Cross Country:
- Football: 1928*, 1929*, 1930*, 1931, 1941, 1942, 1944*, 1946, 1947*, 1949*, 1951*, 1952*
- Golf:
- Boys Track & Field:
- Girls Track & Field:
- Volleyball:

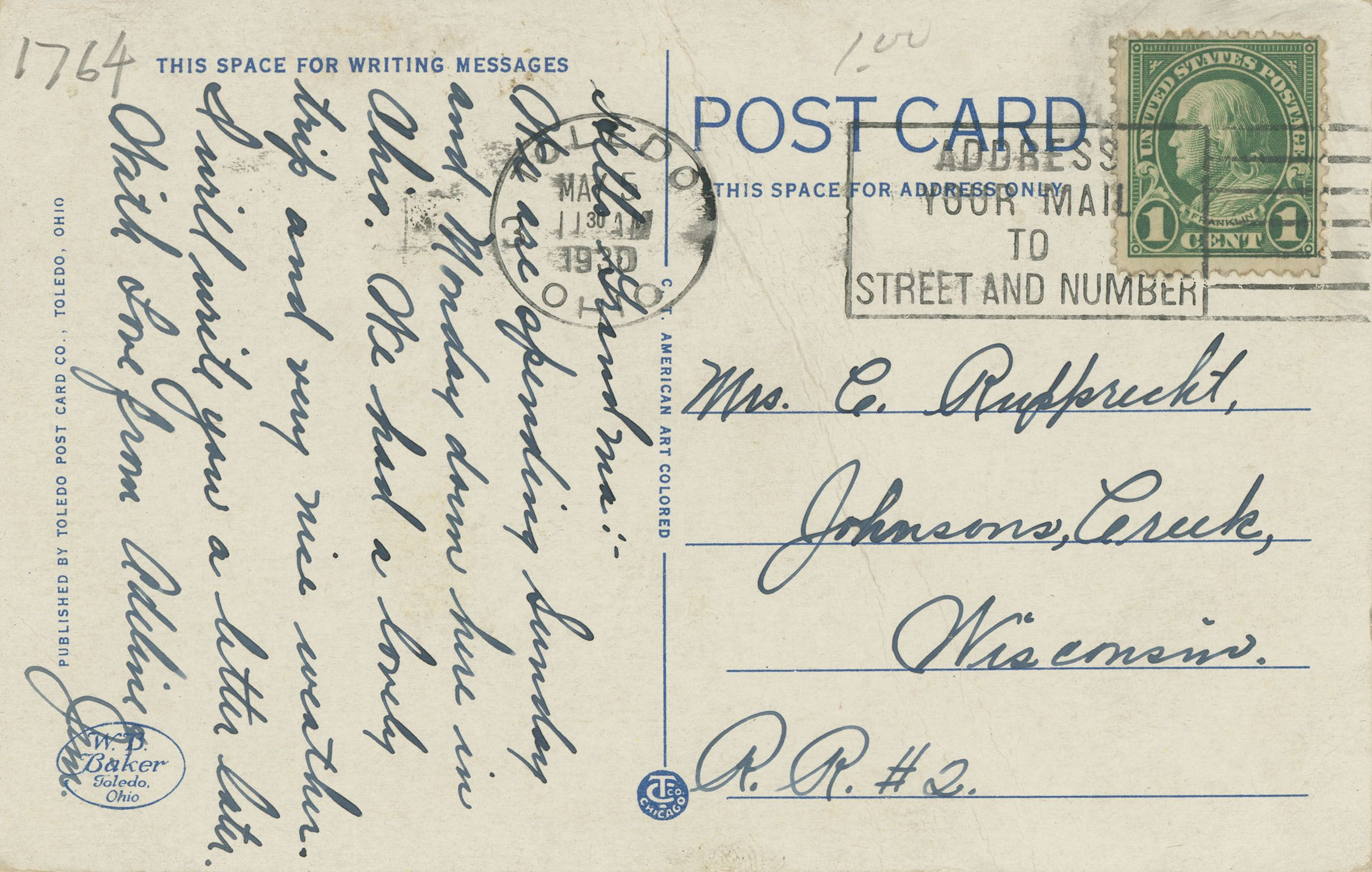
Written portion of the Libbey High School postcard, 1930

(years marked with an asterisk (*) denote a shared title)

== Notable alumni ==
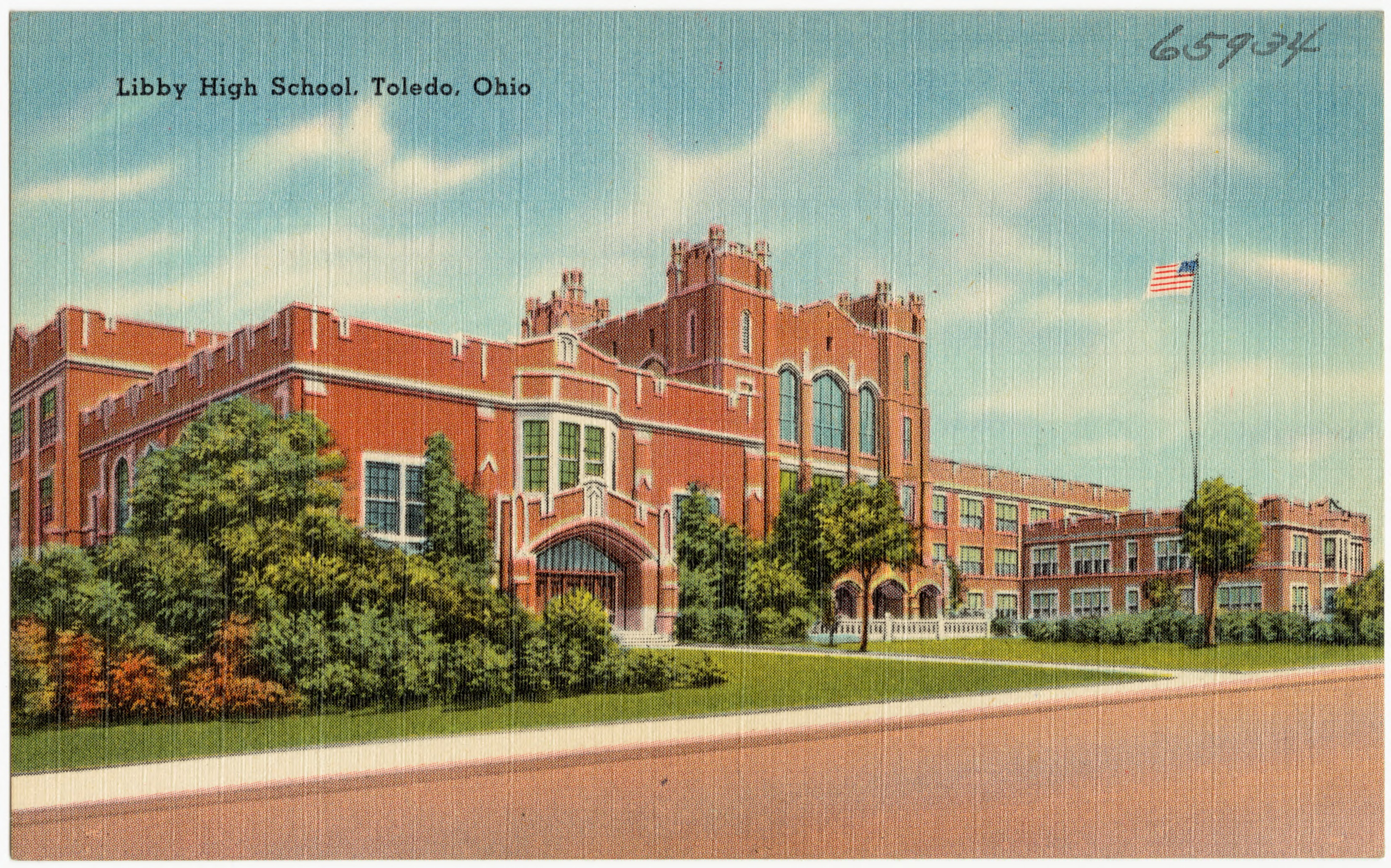
A postcard of the campus

- Ramona Brooks (1969): singer and Broadway actress
- William Buford (2008): basketball player for Ohio State University.
- D. Michael Collins, Mayor of Toledo
- Joe Cooke, basketball player for Indiana University and the Cleveland Cavaliers
- Robert Craig (1937) WWII Medal of Honor Recipient
- Dennis Russell Davies (1962) General Music Director of the Baden-Württemberg State Opera House from 1980 to 1987. Chief conductor of the Bruckner Orchestra Linz and the Linz Opera from 2002 to 2017.Principal Conductor of the Brno Philharmonic 2018–2022.
- David Dusing (1961) tenor, composer, arranger, and conductor
- Jack Hallett, Former MLB player (Chicago White Sox, Pittsburgh Pirates, New York Giants)
- Linda Jefferson (1972): female professional American football player in the 1970s
- Tony Momsen (1945): football player for the Pittsburgh Steelers and Washington Redskins of the NFL and for the Calgary Stampeders of the CFL. Played college ball for the University of Michigan, where he scored the winning touchdown in the 1950 Snow Bowl.
- Lee Pete: sports talk radio broadcaster
- Bob Snyder (1932): played football for Ohio University and in the NFL for the Pittsburgh Americans, Cleveland Rams, and Chicago Bears, winning NFL titles in 1938, 1939, and 1941. He later became a head coach in the NFL and NCAA.
- Ike Stubblefield: American musician
- Dick Szymanski: Former football player and executive with the Baltimore Colts where he won three NFL Championships as a player and later served as general manager.
- Bill Thornton (1959): Former football player for NFL St. Louis Cardinals and University of Nebraska and football coach for University of Nebraska, St. Louis Cardinals, and University of Missouri.
- Chet Trail (1962), baseball player and clergyman
