= Toledo High School =

Toledo High School may refer to:

- Toledo Early College High School, Toledo, Ohio, USA
- Toledo High School (Ohio), former school in Toledo, Ohio (1857 – 1914)
- Toledo High School (Oregon), Toledo, Oregon, USA
- Toledo High School (Washington), Toledo, Washington, USA
- Toledo Science High School, Toledo City, Cebu, Philippines
