= Carl Joseph =

Carl Joseph may refer to:

- Carl James Joseph (born c. 1961), American itinerant preacher
- Carl Joseph, 3rd Prince of Clary-Aldringen (1777–1831)
