= Waite High School (Toledo, Ohio) =

Public, coeducational high school in Toledo, Ohio, United States

Morrison R. Waite High School
- Waite High School
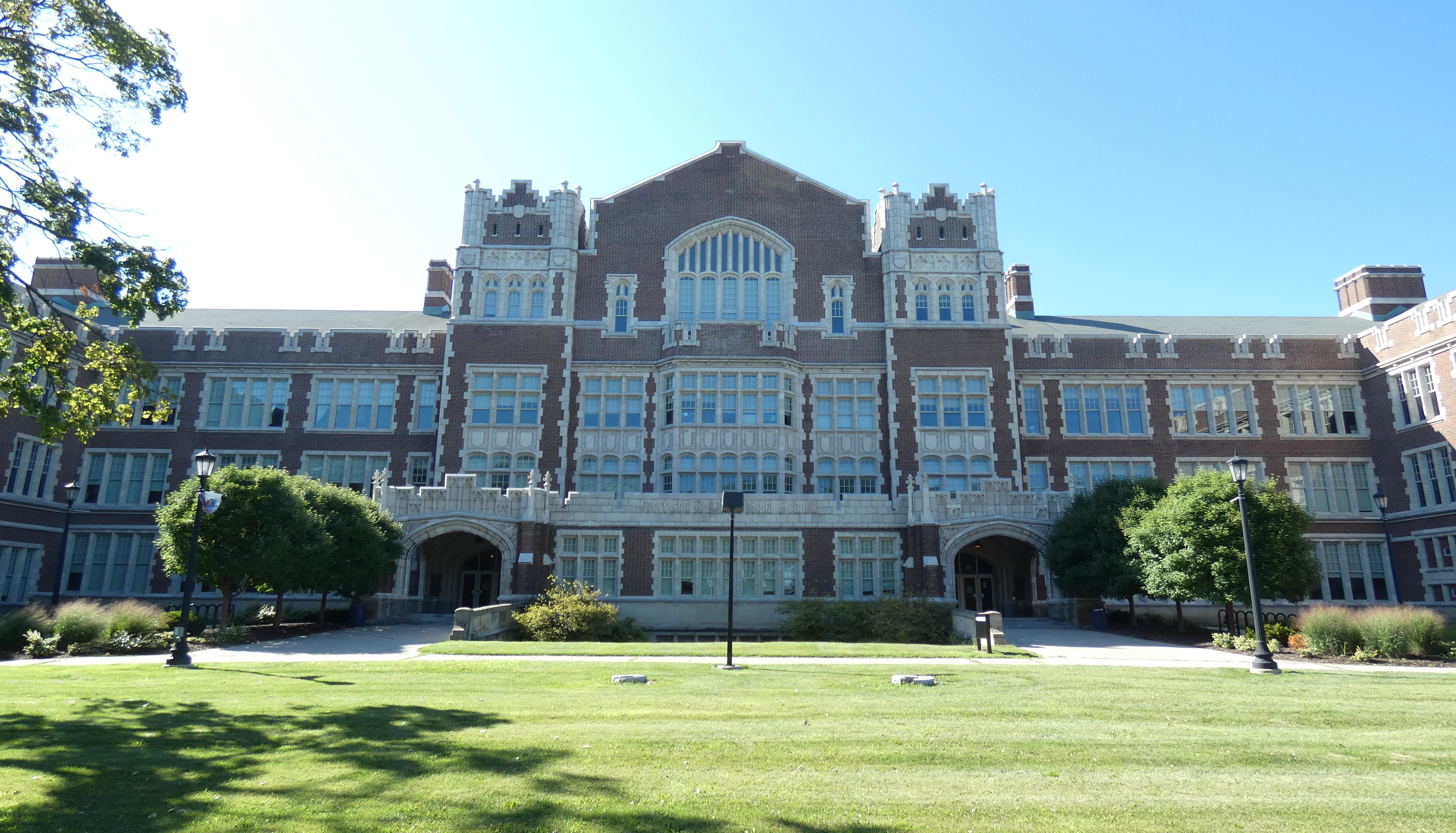
- Front portion of the school

Location
- 301 Morrison Drive; Toledo, (Lucas County), Ohio 43605; United States; 41°38′57″N 83°31′5″W

Information
- Type: Public, Coeducational high school
- Established: 1914
- School district: Toledo City School District
- Superintendent: Romules Durant
- Principal: Todd Deem
- Grades: 9-12
- Average class size: 26
- Colors: Purple & Gold
- Fight song: Loyal
- Athletics conference: Toledo City League
- Mascot: Indian
- Team name: Indians
- Accreditation: North Central Association of Colleges and Schools
- Website: www.tps.org

Morrison R. Waite High School is a public high school located in east Toledo, Ohio that opened in 1914. It is part of the Toledo Public Schools. It is named after Morrison R. Waite, a Chief Justice of the Supreme Court who is famous for overseeing the Alabama Claims case. Waite replaced the original Central High School when Toledo Public Schools decided it couldn't afford to have 3 high schools for the 1914-15 school year. (Scott High School had opened in 1913.)

The Waite Indians are members of the Toledo City League and their school colors are purple and gold. However, the Indian nickname is not for Native Americans. When the school was first opened, the Toledo Fire Department had an annual competition that involved running and pulling the fire truck. The team from the East Side was called the Indians. Someone thought it would be a good idea to name the school's athletic teams after the Fire Department team. The Indians have a rivalry with fellow East Toledo City League rival Clay. The rivalry ended in 2019. They had a football rivalry from 1914 thru 1963 with Scott High School that was played every Thanksgiving morning and generated much interest across the Midwest. That game is now played on the final Friday of October and, with the closings of Libbey and DeVilbiss High Schools, has become once again the top rivalry for both high schools. Waite has named their football stadium after their successful coach, Jack Mollenkopf, who also coached football at Purdue.

Waite was a national high school football power in the 1920s, traveling as far as California. In 1927, they played away games on successive Fridays in Portland, Oregon and Portland, Maine. Travel was by train. They were crowned National High School Champions in 1924 and again in 1932. In 1924 they went 10-0 under Coach Joe Collins to win the title. In 1932, under Coach Don McCallister and Assistant Frank Pauly, they defeated Miami High School 13-7 in Miami to finish 12-0 and win the honor.

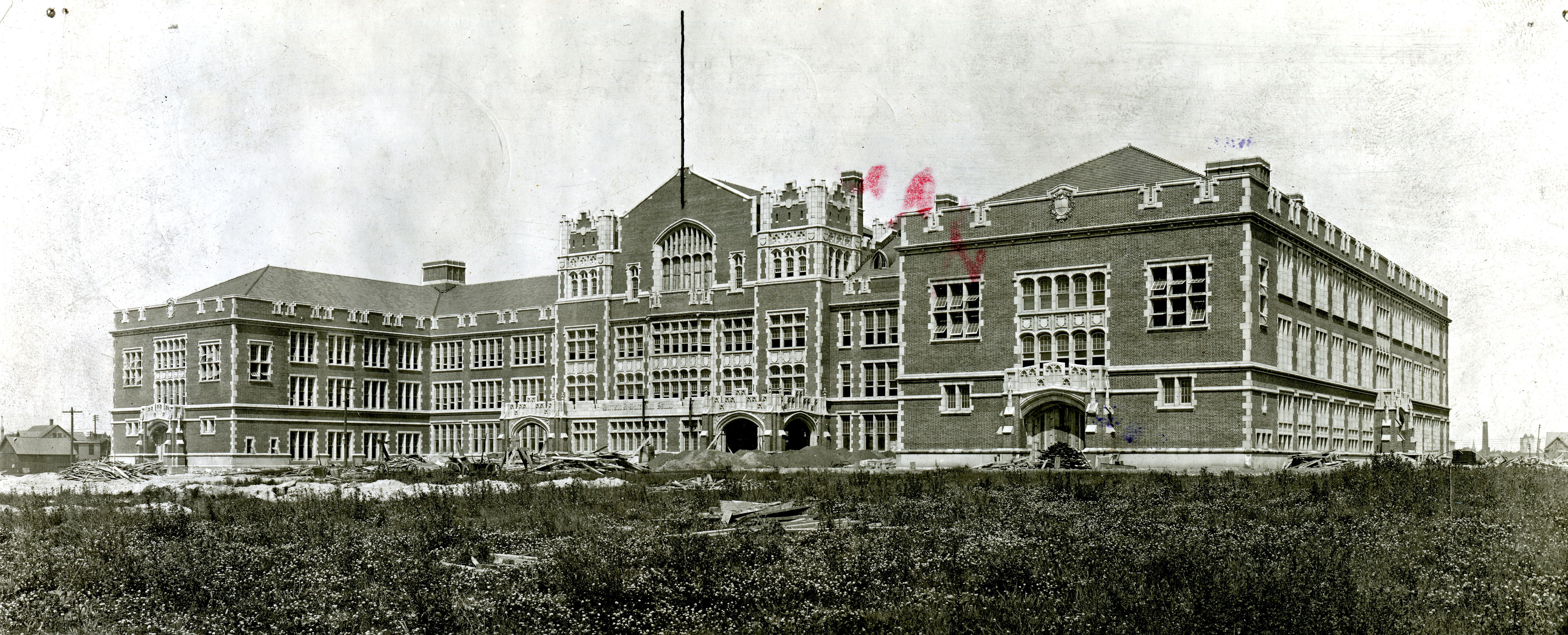
Waite High School, Toledo, Ohio, 1910s

The school's Latin Club functions as a local chapter of both the Ohio Junior Classical League (OJCL) and National Junior Classical League (NJCL).

== Toledo City League titles ==
- Football: 1926, 1928*, 1929*, 1932, 1933, 1934, 1935, 1937, 1938*, 1939, 1940, 1943, 1945, 1947*, 1948, 1952*, 1956, 1963, 2014*
- Girls Tennis 2016, 2023
- Boys Cross Country: 1984
- Golf:
- Boys Basketball: 1926-27, 1931–32, 1932–33, 1937–38
- Girls Basketball: 2004-05 2005-06 2006-07
- Wrestling: 1999-00, 2002–03, 2003–04, 2004–05 2005-06 2017-18 2019-20 2020-21 2021-22
- Baseball:1966 (Sectional, District, & Regional Champions; State Semi-Finalists), 1967, 1982, 2002
- Boys Track and Field: 1926, 1927
- Girls Track and Field:
- Softball:
- Bowling: 1988

(years marked with an asterisk (*) denote a shared title)

== Notable alumni ==
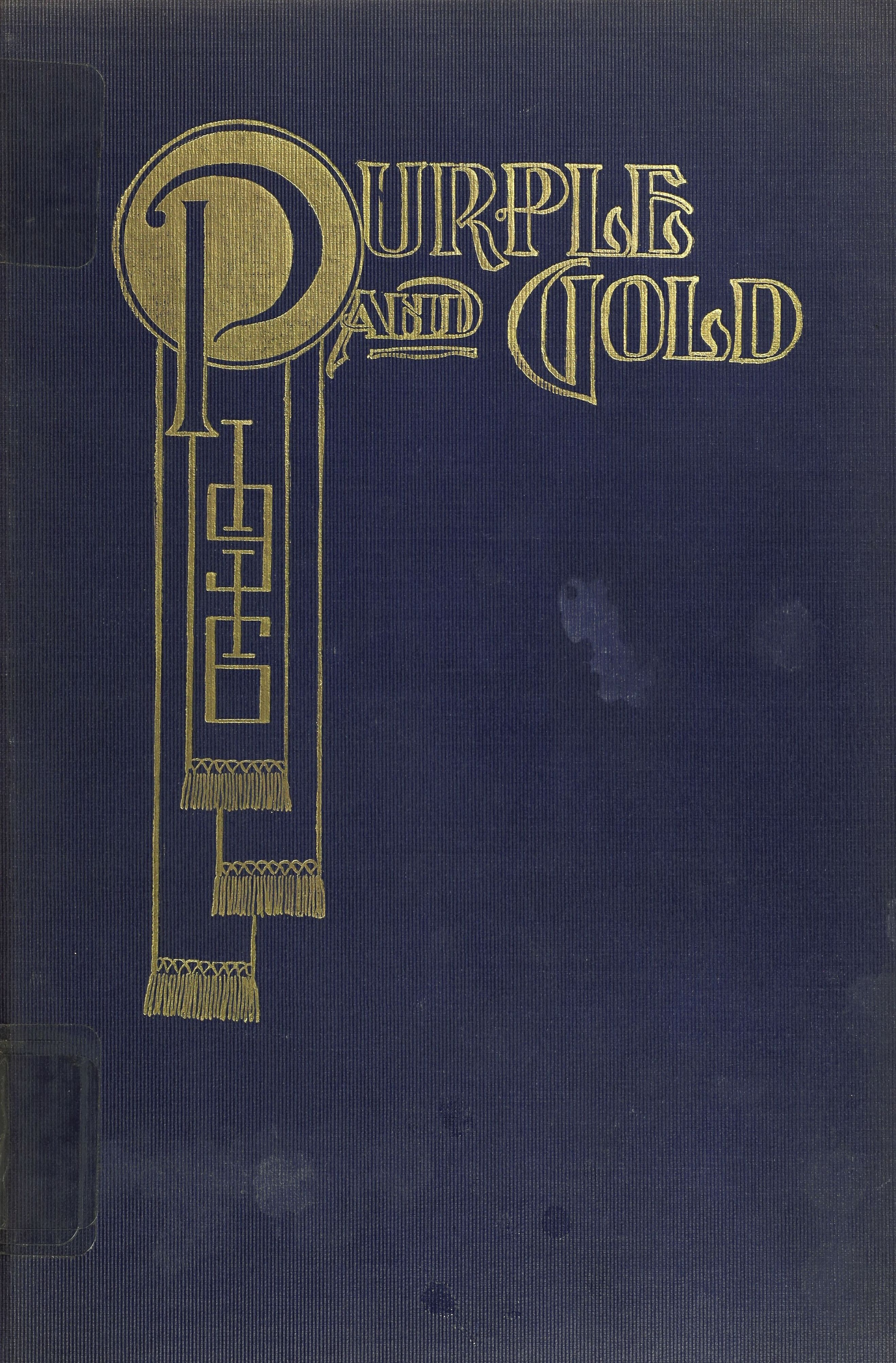
Cover of the 1916 "Purple and Gold," the yearbook of Waite High School

- Teresa Brewer - American singer
- Natasha Howard - Three-time WNBA champion
- Curtis Johnson - American Football player
- Mark Kerr - Two-time UFC heavyweight tournament winner and NCAA Division I wrestling champion
- Jack Mollenkopf - American Football coach (1935-1946)
- Drusilla Nixon - Community activist and music educator
- Frank Pauly - American Football coach
- Gloria Steinem - Feminist activist
