= Woodward High School (Toledo, Ohio) =

Calvin M. Woodward High School
- Woodward High School
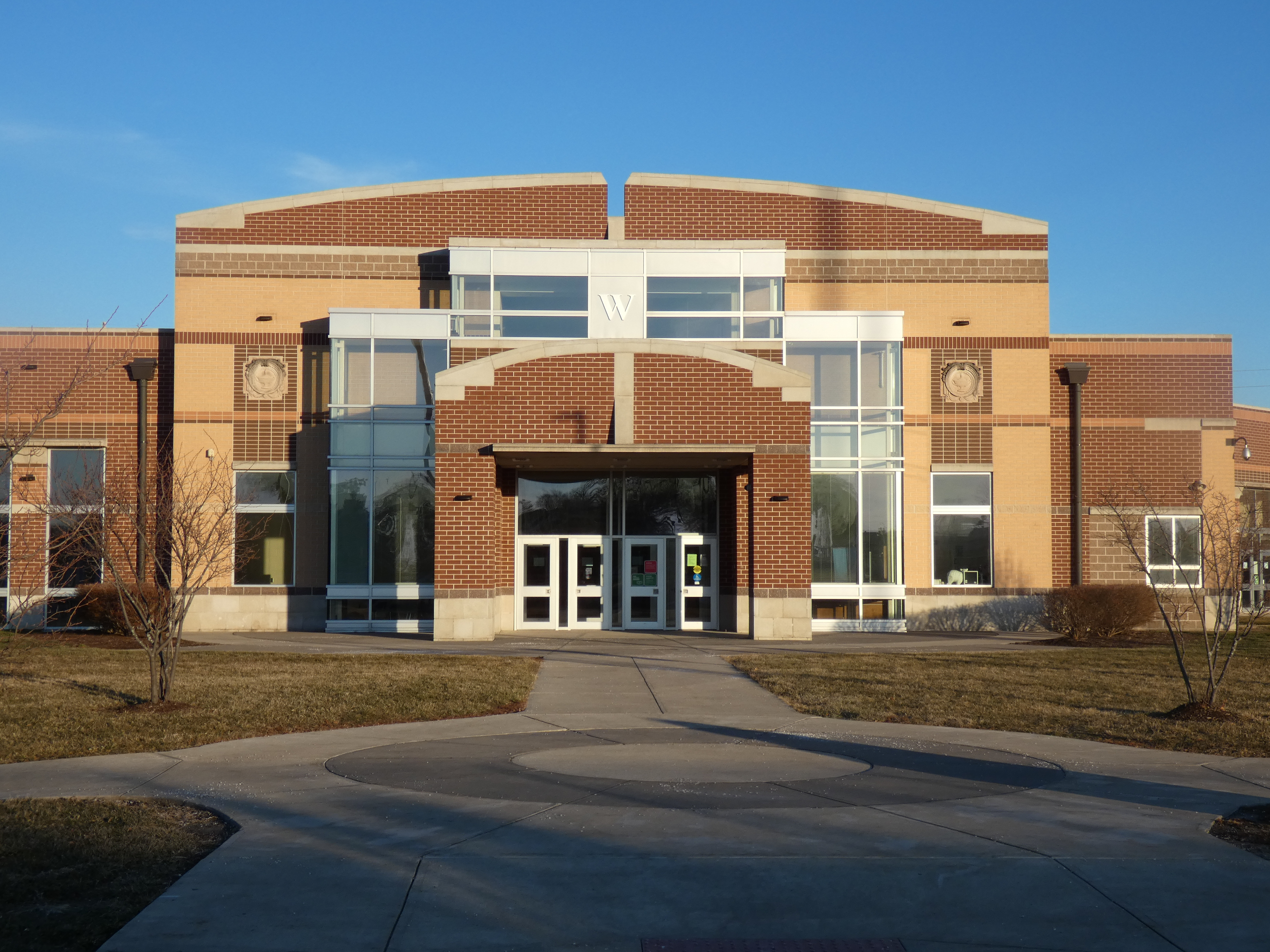
- School's side entrance.

Location
- 701 E. Central Ave. Toledo, Ohio; United States
- Coordinates: 41°40′49″N 83°31′44″W

Information
- Type: Public, Coeducational high school
- School district: Toledo City School District
- Principal: Jack Renz
- Teaching staff: 48.00 (FTE) (2023–2024)
- Grades: 9-12
- Enrollment: 595 (2023–2024)
- Student to teacher ratio: 12.40 (2023–2024)
- Colors: Blue & White
- Athletics conference: Toledo City League
- Team name: Polar Bears
- Accreditation: North Central Association of Colleges and Schools
- Website: woodwardhighschool.tps.org

Calvin M. Woodward High School is a public high school located in the north side of Toledo, Ohio, that was built in 1928. It was named after an early advocate for vocational education. The original Woodward Technical High School was located in the former Central High School building at the corner of Adams and Michigan streets (the current site of the Lucas County Main Library) before the present location was chosen. Woodward is part of the Toledo City School District.

The Woodward Polar Bears wear blue and white for athletics and either chose their nickname because they are located in the north end of Toledo, or because former principal Charles LaRue named them after his alma mater at Ohio Northern University. Woodward is a charter member of the Toledo City League from 1926. From 1923 to 1932, Woodward played Libbey High School in a football game on Thanksgiving Day until Libbey and DeVilbiss High School became the annual matchup. In April 1937, the High School displayed a Tesla Coil formerly owned by Nikola Tesla to the public, which they had acquired for educational purposes.

In 2010, the building that Woodward's neighborhood had called home since 1928 was replaced by a newer facility located on the same property.

The TPS board approved a resolution in November 2013 to have new stadiums built at Woodward and Scott High School after their previous facilities were torn down during construction and renovation. They were built in time for the 2014 season. Woodward's previous stadium had been dedicated in 1969 after they had gone without one since the 1930s.

Mr. Jack Renz is the current principal.

== Ohio High School Athletic Association State Championships ==
- Girls Basketball - 1976

== Toledo City League Titles ==
- Football: 1952*, 1975*, 1991*, 2019
- Volleyball:
- Golf:
- Boys Basketball: 1927–28, 1929–30, 1939–40*, 1941–42*, 1943–44*, 1944–45, 1946–47, 1952–53*, 1959–60*, 1963–64
- Girls Basketball: 1975–76
- Wrestling:
- Baseball:
- Boys Track and Field:
- Girls Track and Field: 1970
- Softball:

* – (years marked with an asterisk (*) denote a shared title)

== Notable alumni ==
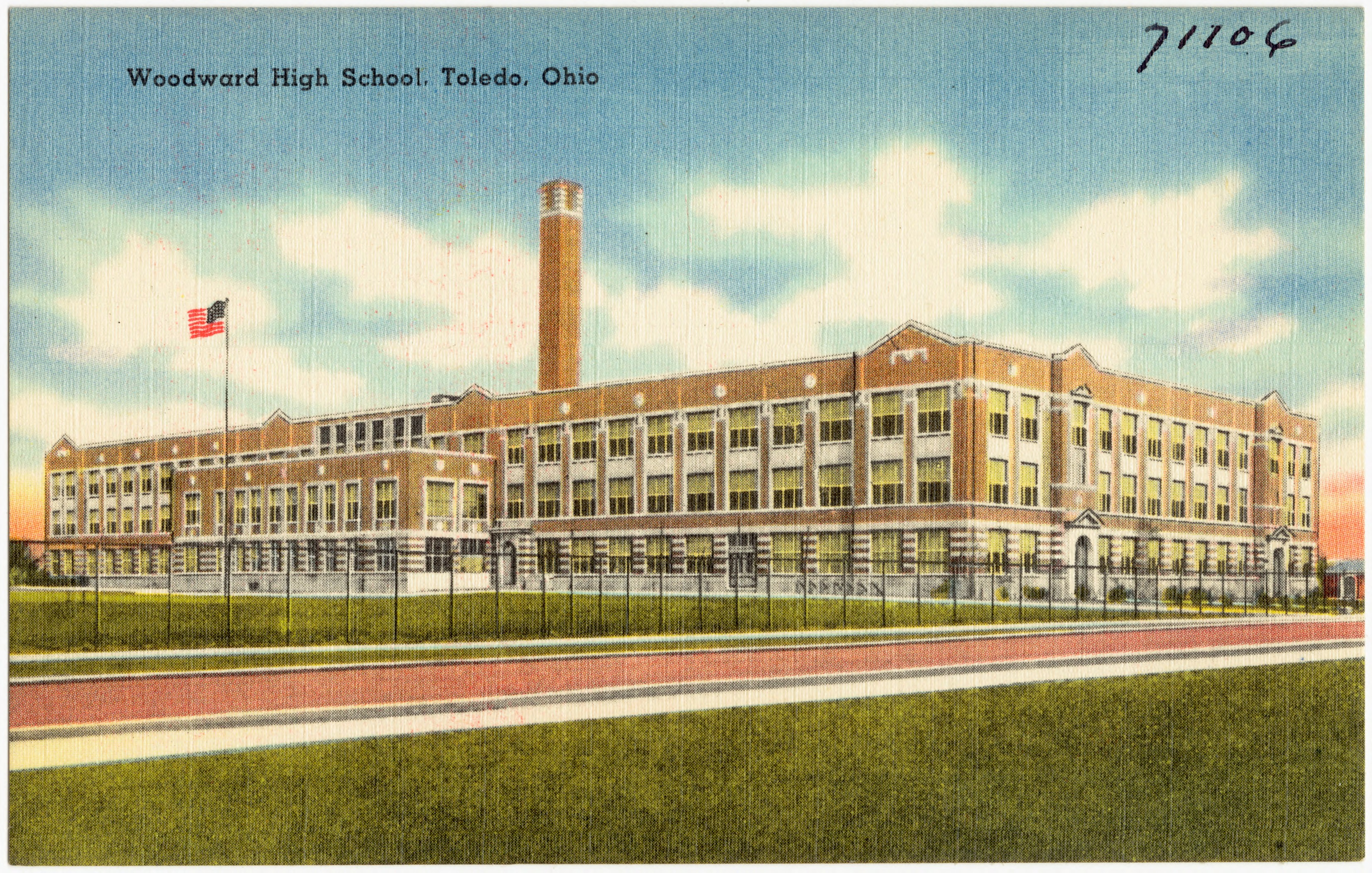
A postcard of the old school building.

- Danny Thomas (dropped out c. 1927), actor, comedian and nightclub singer
- Billy Jones (class of c. 1932), former NBL basketball player, pioneer in integrating professional American sports
- Aaron Novick (class of 1937), molecular biologist
- John Payak (class of 1944), former NBA player
- Paul Seymour (class of 1945), former NBA player and coach
- Bob Harrison (class of 1945), former NBA player
- Andrew J. Fenady (class of 1946), screenwriter, novelist and film producer
- Philip Baker Hall (class of 1949), actor
- Jamie Farr (class of 1952), actor
- Howie Komives (class of 1960), NCAA scoring champion at Bowling Green, played for New York Knicks and Detroit Pistons
- Gloria Ann Taylor (class of c. 1962), R&B, soul and gospel singer, 1970 Grammy nominee
- Dick Drago (class of 1963), former Major League Baseball relief pitcher
- Walt Piatkowski (class of 1964), former basketball player at Bowling Green and in the American Basketball Association, father of Eric Piatkowski
- Marvin Crenshaw (class of c. 1970), former All-American football player
- Bryan Robinson (class of 1993), former Arizona Cardinals defensive lineman
- Bill Laskey (class of 1975), former MLB baseball pitcher with the Giants, Expos, and Indians
- Tom Marsh (class of c. 1983), former MLB baseball player with Philadelphia Phillies
