= Toledo Early College High School =

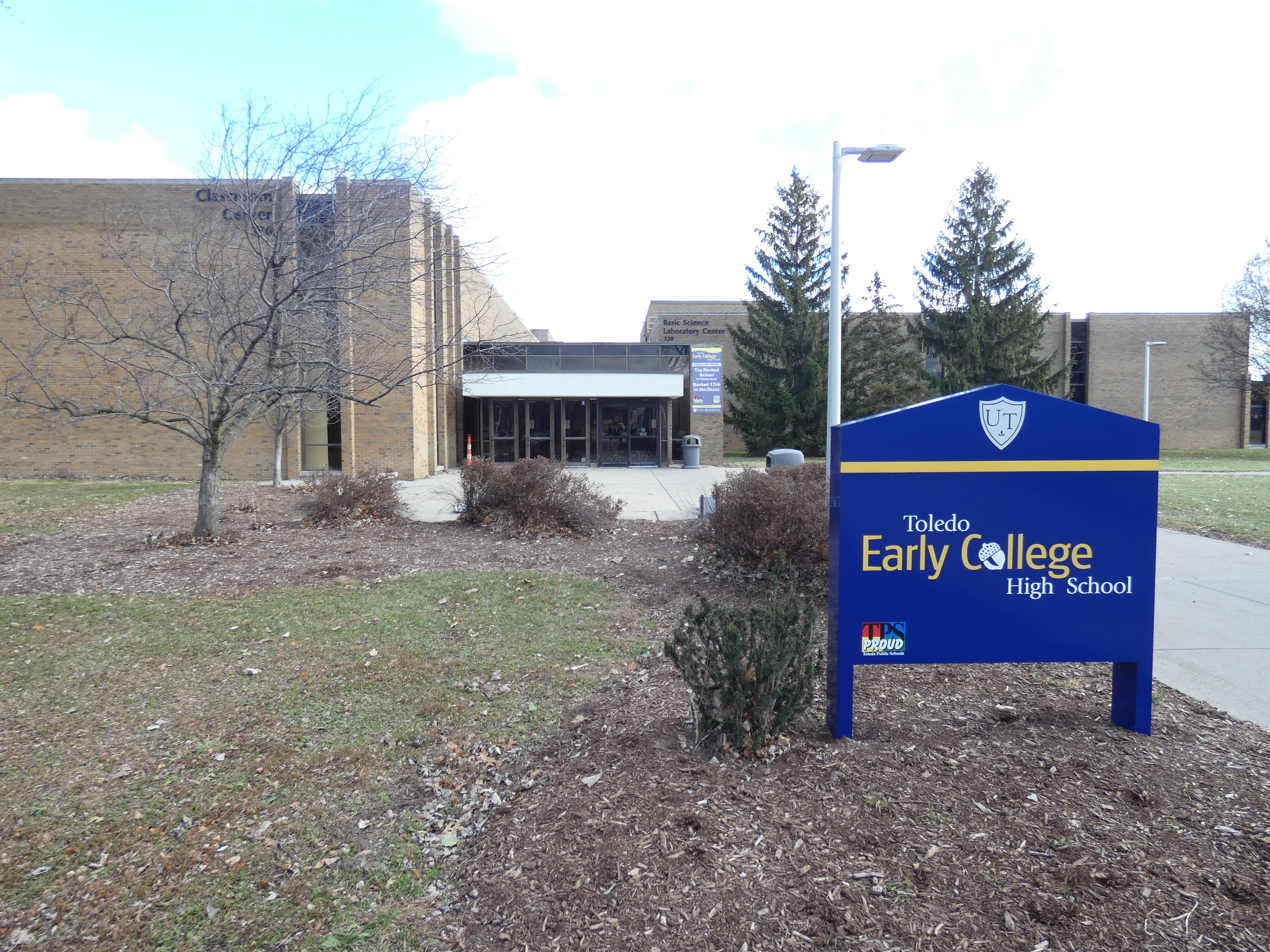
- Former entrance to Toledo Early College

Location
- 2800 W Bancroft St; Toledo, Ohio 43606; United States; 41°39′49″N 83°36′39″W

Information
- Type: Public, Coeducational
- Established: 2005
- School district: Toledo City School District
- Principal: Paulette Cole
- Enrollment: 335 (2021-22)
- Colors: Blue and gold
- Website: toledoearlycollege.tps.org

Toledo Early College (TEC) is a public high school located in Toledo, Ohio. Part of the Toledo school system, it was founded in 2005 as an Early college high school and provide students the opportunity to simultaneously pursue a high school diploma and earn college credits. All students who apply to the school are considered, including students who are serviced through Individual Educational Plans. However, preference is given to students who are ethnic minorities, ESL students, students who qualify for free/reduced lunches, and students who are the first generation to attend college. Any student who lives in Northwest Ohio is encouraged to apply. Students represent many districts in the surrounding Toledo area. Beginning in the fall of 2017, Toledo Early College will open a junior high servicing 7th and 8th graders. The school was ranked 17th in the state of Ohio in 2012 and during its second year of operation achieved an "Excellent" ranking.

Toledo Early College High School is affiliated with the University of Toledo.

== History of Early College High School ==
In 2005, Toledo Early College High School began its first school year with the freshman class of 2009.

In 2010, Toledo Public Schools considered closing TECHS as part of budget cuts. TPS later eliminated closing the school, along with Toledo Technology Academy, in favor of closing Libbey High School.

== TECHS academics ==
On average, TECHS OGT scores are particularly high. In the 2006–2007 school year, the first administration had passing rates of 100% (Writing), 100% (Reading), 100% (Math), 96% (Social Studies), and 88% (Science).

The high attendance rate at Toledo Early College High School is crucial to the school's Excellent rating.

This quote may be found on the Toledo Early College school website:

Toledo Early College High School has earned an "Excellent" rating on the Toledo Public Schools report card that was issued by the Ohio Department of Education for the 2006-2007 school year. The "Excellent" rating was based on Toledo Early College High School's daily attendance record and Ohio Graduation Test scores.

== How Toledo Early College works ==
Students who attend Toledo Early College High School begin taking college classes when they are in 8th grade or as freshman. This first class is taught on the Scott Park campus and directed by a college instructor. During the student's junior year, he or she begins taking classes on the main campus of the University of Toledo.

During the student's junior and senior year, most if not all classes are taken on the University of Toledo campuses, including the Center for Visual Arts at the Toledo Museum of Art.

Students can graduate from TECHS with up to 60 college credits, equivalent to two years of credit at UT.

== School clubs and organizations ==
Toledo Early College High School has several clubs and student activities. Principal Robin Wheatley said the school has "a competitive quiz bowl team, yearbook staff, Youth to Youth, drama club, chess club, a community dance troupe and an American Sign Language club, to name a few."

- Yearbook
- Quiz Bowl
- Drama Club
- Spirit Club
- Capture the Change
- Ottawa River Dancers
- Gaming Club
- Film Club
- Dance Team
- Red Cross Club
- Soccer Club
- Broomball
- InsidetheAcorn.com
- STEMM
- Youth to Youth
- Youth Creating Change
- Teen Pep
- School Newspaper
- Japanese Club
- Art Club

== Graduates ==
The first class of students officially graduated on May 21, 2009. 43 students graduated at the ceremony in Nitschke Hall at the University of Toledo. And the class of 2013 had the largest graduating class at the school with a total of 52 graduates on May 21, 2013,

Many of the graduates from 2009 through 2015 are continuing their college education at The University of Toledo and other colleges.

The class of 2023's graduation will mark the first students to have gone through all grades the school offers.
