= Start High School (Toledo, Ohio) =

Public, coeducational high school in Toledo, Ohio, United States

Toledo Start
- Roy C. Start High School
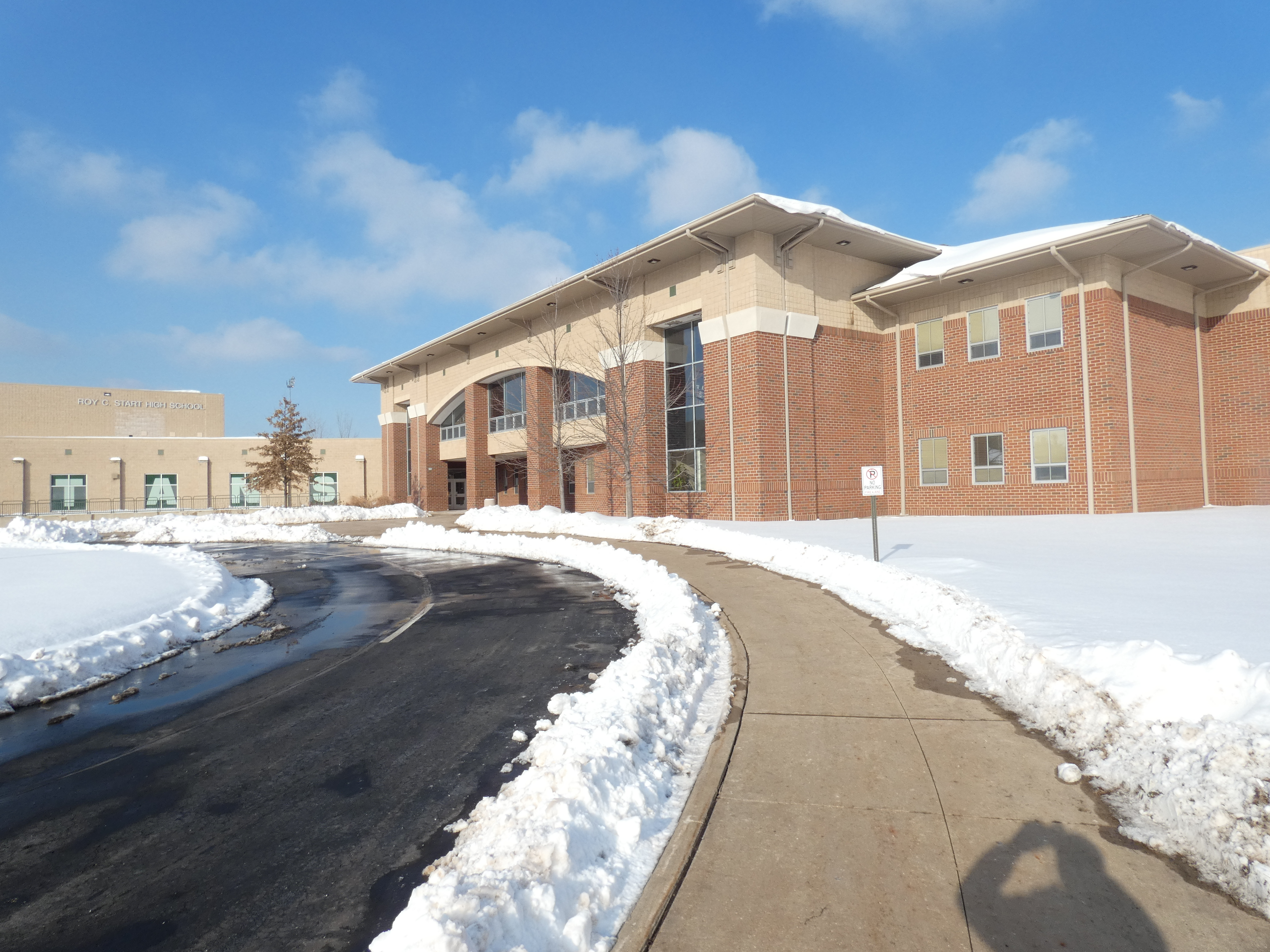
- Front entrance of the school

Location
- 2010 Tremainsville Road; Toledo, (Lucas County), Ohio 43613; United States
- Coordinates: 41°42′5″N 83°35′36″W

Information
- Type: Public, Coeducational high school
- School district: Toledo City School District
- Superintendent: Romules Durant
- Dean: Tyson Harder
- Principal: Ed Perozek
- Grades: 9-12
- Colors: Green & Gold
- Fight song: Victory for Start
- Athletics conference: Toledo City League
- Mascot: Spartans
- Team name: Toledo Start
- Accreditation: North Central Association of Colleges and Schools
- Feeder schools: Elmhurst, DeVeaux, Grove Patterson, Larchmont, Longfellow, McKinley, Old Orchard and Whittier
- Website: http://www.tps.org/

Roy C. Start High School is the largest comprehensive public high school in Toledo, Ohio, United States. The school opened in 1962 and is part of the Toledo Public Schools. It was named after Roy C. Start, two-time mayor of Toledo and founder of the West Toledo YMCA. The school building was demolished and replaced with a new building. Students have been attending the new Start since January 2008. The only part of the original Roy C. Start High School building in use is the auditorium (which is now in the West Toledo YMCA building) and is attached to the new building.

== Start Football ==
Start's football team appeared in the first OHSAA playoffs Division I in school history after finishing the regular season 9-1 during the 2015 season. In 2016, after finishing 5-5 (0-5 out of conference ) Start won back to back city championships, a first in school history.

== Rivalries ==
From its opening until 1991, Start had a rivalry with the DeVilbiss Tigers, which were located in the same neighborhood and a very short distance south of Start. When DeVilbiss closed, much of its school district was absorbed by Start after a community effort urging TPS to merge Start into DeVilbiss had failed.

Start's main and long-standing rivals is Washington Local Schools' Whitmer Panthers, located just over two miles away on Clegg Drive. The "Battle of Tremainsville" was a non-conference matchup from Start's inception in the early 1960s until Whitmer joined the City League in 2003. Beginning with the 2011-12 school year, it reverted to a non-league matchup when Whitmer joined the new Three Rivers Athletic Conference.

== Notable alumni ==
- Scott Shriner (1983): bass guitarist, Weezer
- Devin Vargas (2000): boxer, 2004 Olympics, 2000 & 2001 National Golden Gloves Heavyweight Champion

== Ohio High School Athletic Association State Championships ==
- Baseball - 1994 (Easton National Champions), 2000
- Girls Track and Field – 1980
