= Scott High School (Ohio) =

Jesup Wakeman Scott High School
- Scott High School
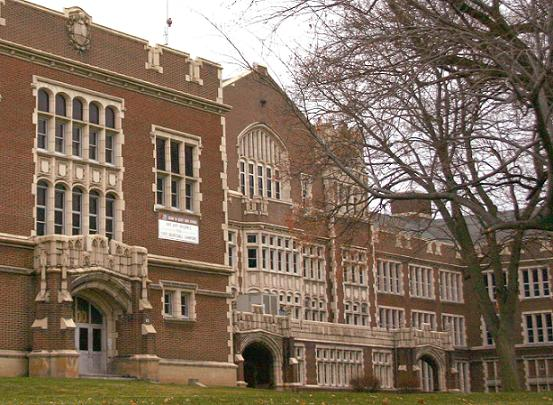

Location
- 2400 Collingwood Blvd; Toledo, (Lucas County), Ohio 43613; United States; 41°40′9″N 83°33′15″W

Information
- Type: Public, Coeducational high school
- School district: Toledo City School District
- Superintendent: Romules Durant
- Principal: Carnell Smith
- Teaching staff: 48.00 (on an FTE basis)
- Grades: 9–12
- Student to teacher ratio: 14.38
- Colors: Maroon and white
- Athletics conference: Toledo City League
- Team name: Bulldogs
- Accreditation: North Central Association of Colleges and Schools
- Newspaper: The Thistle
- Yearbook: Scottonian
- Athletic Director: Wakeso Peterson
- Website: http://www.tps.org

Jesup Wakeman Scott High School is a public high school located in the Old West End neighborhood of Toledo, Ohio. It is part of Toledo Public Schools. It was named for a former editor of The Toledo Blade from 1844 to 1847. Scott was an entrepreneur, philanthropist and well-known civic leader who envisioned Toledo as the "Future Great City of the World." The current high school building was built in 1913. After receiving a $1 million grant from the Bill and Melinda Gates Foundation, Scott High School began a transformation from a comprehensive high school to four small learning academies. Each academy, or "Small School" is based on a different career pathway.

The Scott Bulldogs wear maroon and white for athletic events. Their basketball program has been historically known as a powerhouse in the Toledo City League with their biggest rivals being the Macomber Macmen and the Libbey Cowboys. Macomber was the big rivalry until that school's closure in 1991, and Libbey was the main rival until it was closed in 2010. Scott's oldest rivals are the Waite Indians, as their school was built a year after Scott and prompted an annual Thanksgiving Day football matchup that ran from 1914–1963 and generated the interest of many Midwestern newspapers. Scott is also known for its internationally known marching band the "Fantastic Dancing Machines," having one of the premier marching bands in the mid-west, who have won numerous awards in band competitions throughout the United States. The band has performed all over the country.

In 2008, voters approved a $37 million bond to renovate the school and save it from demolition. The building on Collingwood Avenue was temporarily closed during the renovation, which totaled $42 million and was completed December 2011. Prior to that, the students, staff and faculty spent 2.5 school years at the closed DeVilbiss High School. The TPS board approved a resolution in November 2013 to have new stadiums built at Scott and Woodward High School after their previous facilities were torn down during renovation and construction. They were built in time for the 2014 season. Scott previously had two stadiums: a 10,367-seat stadium named after Fred L. Siebert that was demolished in February 1970 when it was condemned, and a roughly 4,000-seat replacement that was dedicated in 1971.

== Ohio High School Athletic Association State Championships ==
- Boys Basketball – 1990
- Boys Track and Field – 1909*, 1910*, 1912*, 1913*, 1917, 1918, 1934, 1935, 1938
- Boys Cross Country – 1934, 1935, 1936
- Football: 1922
- Girls Track and Field – 1975

*Titles won by Central High School prior to being replaced by Scott High School in 1913.

== Toledo City League titles ==
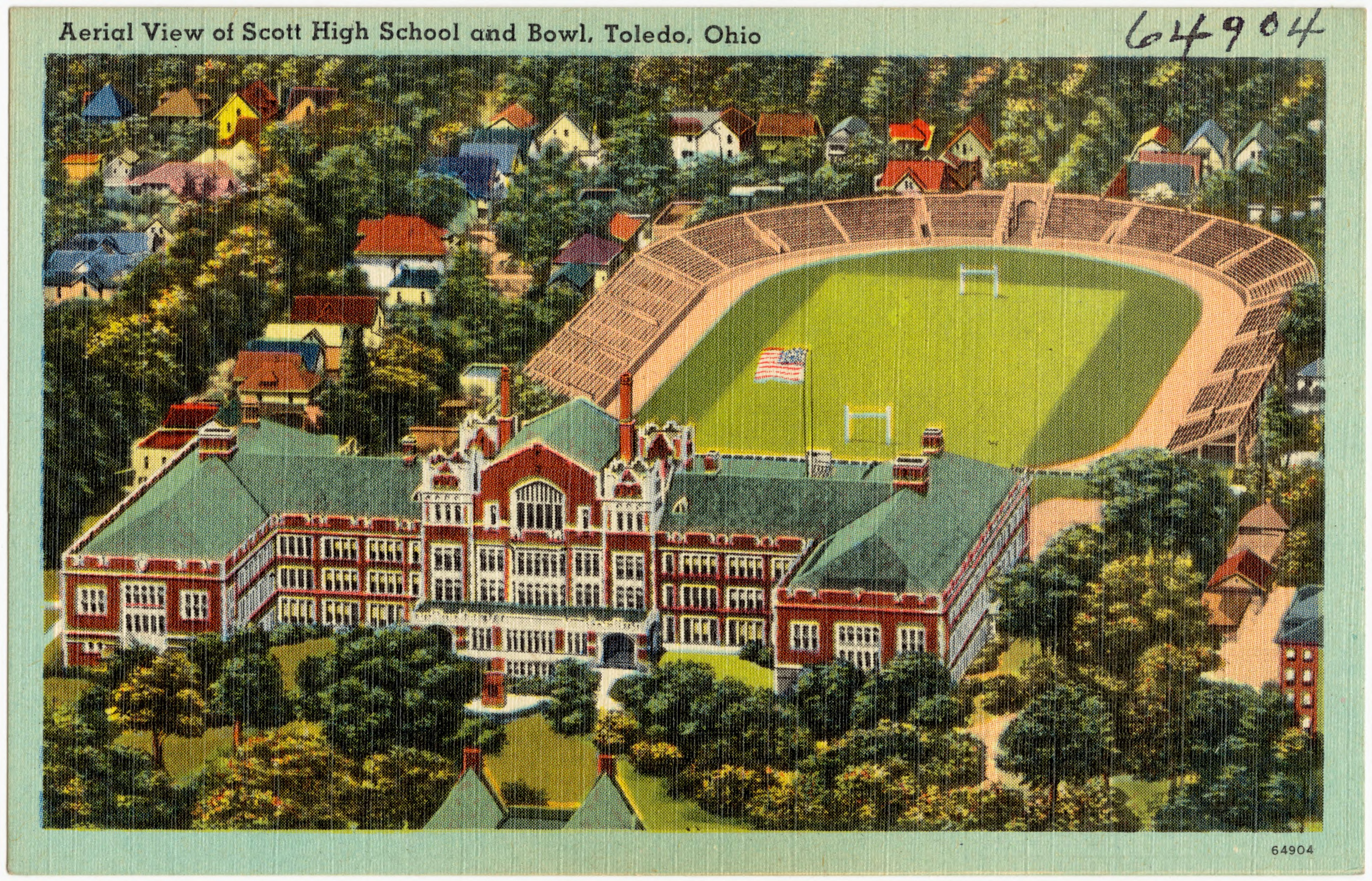
A post card featuring the stadium.

- Football: 1927, 1928*, 1929*, 1930*, 1938*, 1939, 1950, 1971, 1972, 1984, 1985, 2014
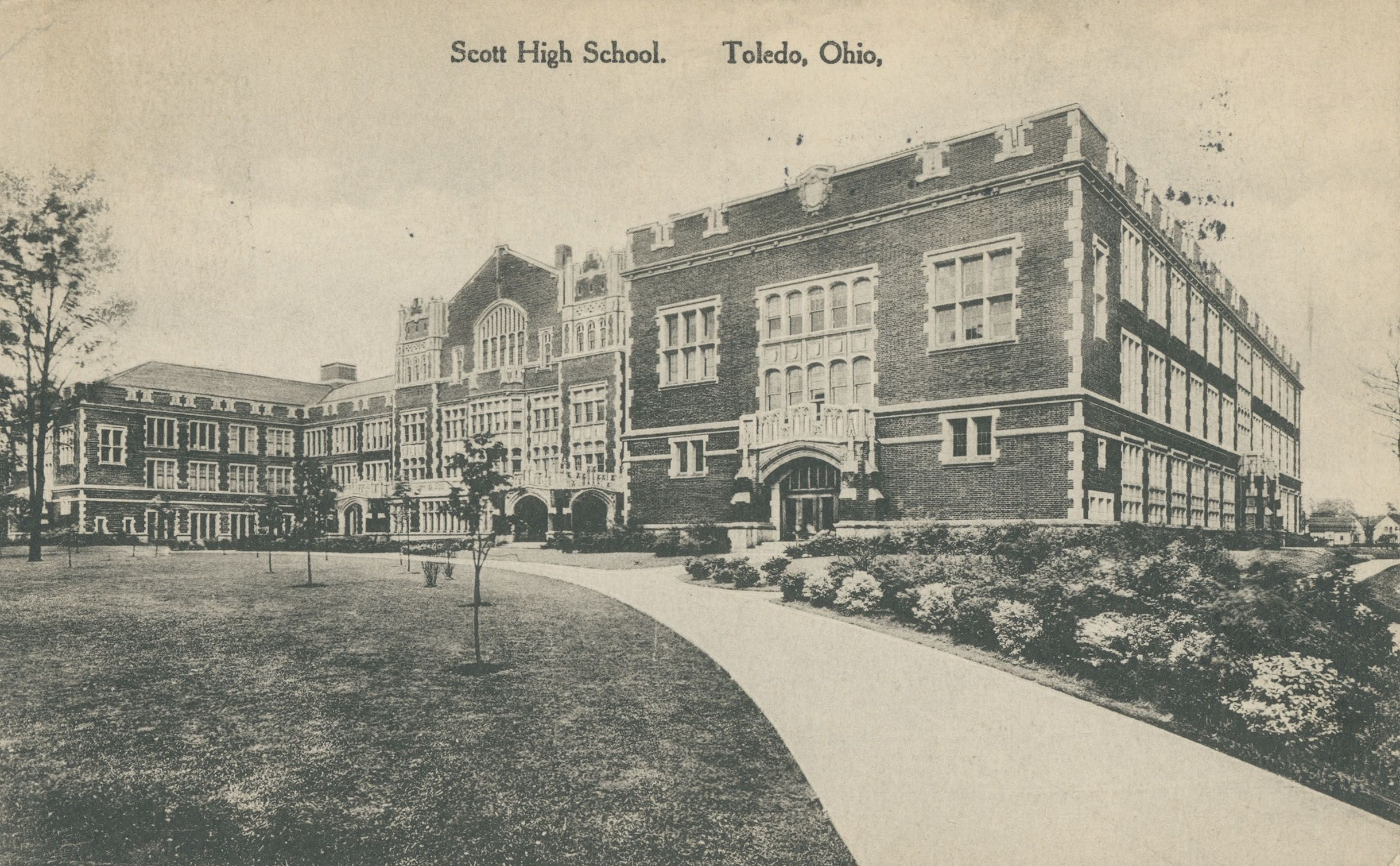
- Scott High School, Toledo, Ohio in 1917
  Volleyball:
- Golf:
- Boys Basketball: 1928–29, 1957–58, 1959–60*, 1971–72, 1973–74, 1974–75, 1975–76, 1976–77, 1977–78, 1979–80, 1981–82, 1983–84, 1984–85, 1985–86, 1989–90, 1991–92, 2000–01, 2005–06, 2014–15
- Girls Basketball:
- Wrestling: 1999–2000, 2002–03, 2003–04, 2004–05
- Boys Soccer: 2021-2022
- Boys Track and Field: 1928, 1929, 1930, 1931, 1932, 1934, 1935, 1936, 1965, 1967, 1968, 1969, 1990
- Girls Track and Field: 1972, 1976
- Softball:

(years marked with an asterisk (*) denote a shared title)

== Football National Championship ==
- In 1922 the football team went undefeated and matched up in game against a team from the west that went undefeated as well to claim the national championship. Scott High School defeated (8-0) Corvallis High School (Oregon) (8-1) 32-0.

== Notable alumni ==
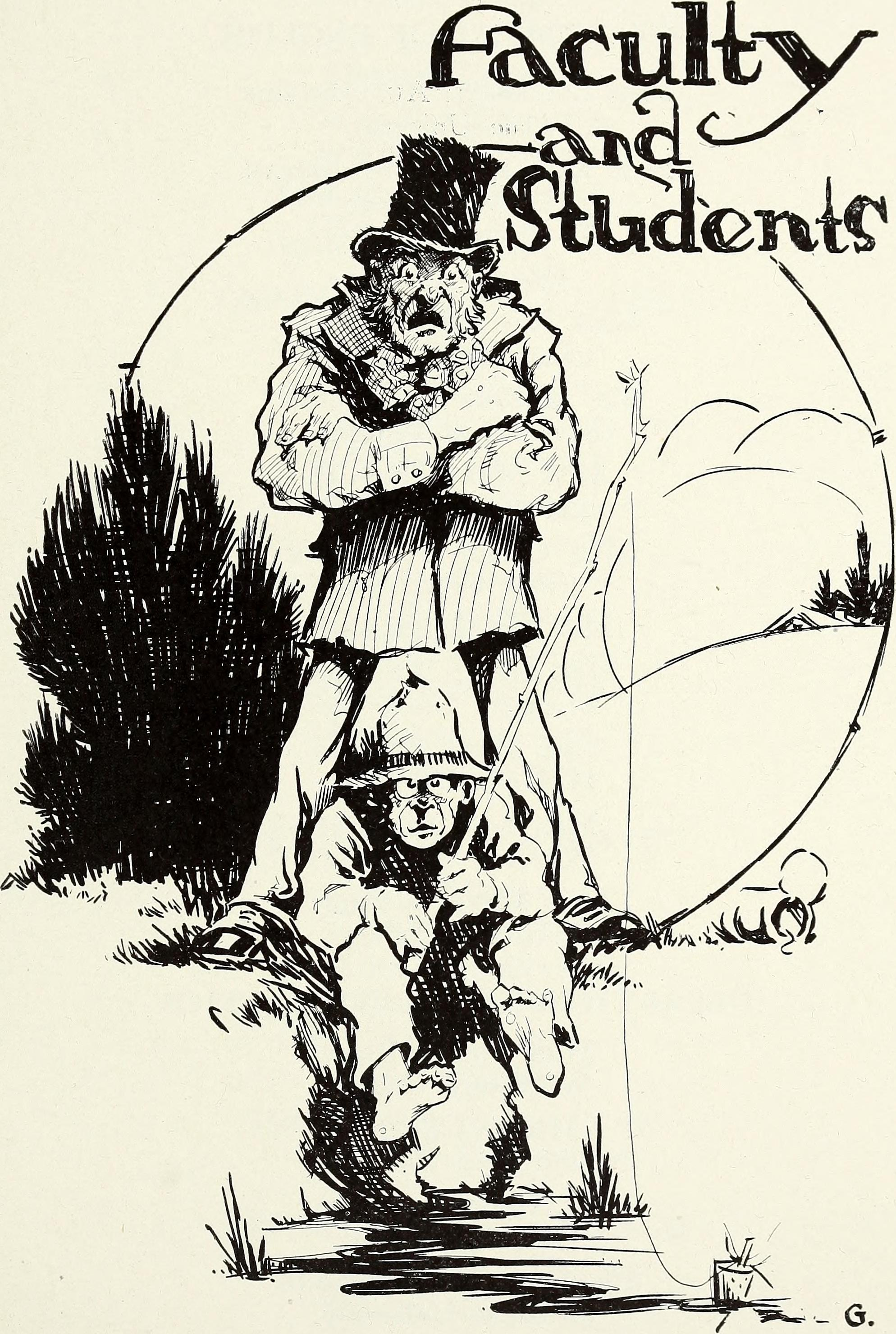
An illustration from the 1921 yearbook, the Scottonian.

- Ron Allen (1962): Former MLB player (St. Louis Cardinals)
- Jared Anderson (boxer) (2018?): Professional heavyweight boxer, nicknamed "Big Baby"
- Odell Barry (1960): played football for the University of Findlay and in the AFL for the Denver Broncos
- Morley Baer (1931): famed photographer and teacher
- Bernard Benton: retired boxer, former WBC Cruiserweight (boxing) champion
- Don Collins (1976): basketball player for Washington State University, the NBA, and CBA
- Stanley Cowell: jazz pianist, co-founder of the Strata-East Records label and professor
- Mari Evans: poet, writer, and dramatist associated with the Black Arts Movement
- Willie Harper (1969): football player for the University of Nebraska and the San Francisco 49ers
- Jon Hendricks (1939): Award-winning jazz vocalist and lyricist, founder of influential jazz vocal trio Lambert, Hendricks, & Ross
- Lindell Holmes: retired boxer, former IBF Super Middleweight champion
- Fred Ladd (1945): television and film writer/producer, one of the first to introduce Japanese animated cartoons to North America
- Wilbert McClure (1956): Olympic gold medal boxer and Pan American Games gold medalist.
- Brenda Morehead (1975): Olympic track and field athlete
- Melvin Newbern (1985): basketball player for the University of Minnesota and Detroit Pistons
- Roosevelt Nix: American football player
- Jim Parker (1953): played football for Ohio State University and the Baltimore Colts
- William Everett Potter, United States Army officer
- Lyman Spitzer (1929?): Famous American theoretical plasma physicist, astronomer and mountaineer
- Dick Szymanski (1951): played football for Notre Dame and the Baltimore Colts
- Art Tatum: influential jazz pianist and virtuoso
- Mildred Taylor (1961): author, known for her works exploring the struggle faced by African-American families in the Deep South
- Ernie Vick (1918): Former MLB player (St. Louis Cardinals)
- Nate Washington (2001): played football for Tiffin University and in the NFL for the Pittsburgh Steelers and Tennessee Titans
- Ernie Wright (1957): played football for Ohio State, and in the AFL for the LA/San Diego Chargers and Cincinnati Bengals
- Wyatt "Sonny" Boswell (1936): Harlem Globetrotter. MVP of 1940 World Pro Basketball Tournament, inducted into the Naismith Basketball Hall of Fame 2022.
- Charles Anthony "Tony" Payton (1938): Harlem Globetrotter (1941–42)(1944–46) inducted into the Naismith Basketball Hall of Fame 1996
- Roscoe "Duke" Cumberland (1932) FIRST basketball player from Toledo to play with the Harlem Globetrotters (1938–42,1943–46, 1949–52)
