= Roy C. Start =

American politician

43rd Mayor of Toledo
- In office 1936–1940
- Preceded by: Solon T. Klotz
- Succeeded by: John Q. Carey

Personal details
- Born: November 3, 1877 Holmes, Ohio, U.S.
- Died: December 15, 1956 (aged 79) Toledo, Ohio, U.S.
- Spouse: Fairy B. Start
- Education: Ohio Northern University

Roy C. Start (November 3, 1877 – December 15, 1956), born in Holmes Township, Ohio, was the Republican mayor of Toledo from 1936 to 1940. He is the namesake for Roy C. Start High School in Toledo, Ohio. Start also founded the West Toledo YMCA.

== Early career ==
Start (1877–1956) graduated from Ohio Northern University in 1899. After college he moved to Toledo where he served as a clerk in a drug store owned by Paul Loesser. A year later, in 1902, he opened his own drug store on the corner of Franklin Avenue and Cherry Street in Toledo. Later he opened two more drug stores in the city, along Sylvania Avenue under the name of the Start Drug Company.

== City Council and Mayor ==
In 1935 he was elected to the city council and was also elected mayor by the newly rechartered city council. He served as the first mayor under a new City Manager style government. He was re-elected in 1937 by one vote over Ollie Czelusta to both city council. He was then elected to the role of mayor. In 1939 he announced that he would not seek re-election to a third term on council, thus ending his run as mayor.

Notably, in 1938 the "All Negro" fire company was formed by Mayor Start. The company operated the former No. 8 station at Indiana Avenue and Division Street, in Toledo, Ohio. It was disbanded 11 months later due to court battles by disgruntled whites.

== Later Public Service ==
In May 1942 Start was elected to serve as President of the Toledo Council of Churches. He was chairman of the board of trustees of Plymouth Congregational Church and the superintendent of its Sunday School. He was a member of several civic and masonic organizations, including the Barton Smith Lodge F&AM, Collingwood Chapel, Scottish Rite, Zenobia Shrine, West Toledo Exchange Club, West Toledo Commerce Club, Municipal League, Ohio Congregational Church Union, Lucas County Pharmaceutical Association. He was also a member of the Lafayette Lyttle Commandery Knights Templar. Shortly before his death he was honored by the West Toledo branch of the YMCA which he founded.

== Lasting Influence ==
Start's role as a businessman and public servant would inspire other businessmen in Toledo to take up public service. Gilbert Siegel a Republican running for Mayor of Toledo and also a drug store owner like Start, was quoted as saying, "Yes Sir... I do expect to win. The Republican party has been successful in running druggists for mayor. Mayors Fred Mery and Roy Start were both druggists. Drugstores can be potent political factors. They are strategically located. Many people frequent drugstores, to buy, to ask advice." This was more than 12 years after Start had died, proof that his legacy was lasting in the Toledo and Northwest Ohio area.

After his death, the Toledo school district named a new high school (Roy C. Start High School) after him, which opened in 1962. It is adjacent to the West Toledo YMCA that Start founded.

== Interment ==
Roy C. Start died in 1956, and is buried at the Toledo Memorial Park and Mausoleum.

Political offices
Preceded by Solon T. Klotz	Mayor of Toledo, Ohio; 1936–1940	Succeeded by John Q. Carey
