= Dosia Carlson =

American hymnwriter and minister (1930–2021)

Reverend Dosia Carlson

Orders
- Ordination: 1979

Personal details
- Born: January 11, 1930 Huron, South Dakota
- Died: January 13, 2021 (aged 91)
- Denomination: United Church of Christ
- Occupation: Minister and nonprofit director
- Education: University of Toledo, BA, 1954; Hartford Seminary, MA, 1960; University of Pittsburgh, PhD, 1967

Dosia Carlson (January 11, 1930 – January 13, 2021) was an American hymnwriter and minister whose work focused on providing support to senior citizens and people with disabilities.

== Early life ==
Dosia Carlson was born on January 11, 1930, in Huron, South Dakota to Alexander, a Congregational pastor, and Elizabeth Carlson. Dosia attended Whittier Elementary School in Toledo, Ohio, where she wrote her first religious composition for a Christmas program. Carlson was also impacted by church summer camp, where she was introduced to missionary work. She wanted to become a missionary in China.

When she was thirteen, Carlson contracted polio. For a year, she was barely able to speak or swallow, so she lived at the Toledo Society for Crippled Children Home. She remained committed to her schoolwork, attending high school part-time and being tutored at home. In her Junior year of high school, Carlson attended a polio center in Georgia. Polio led to Carlson's use of a wheelchair for much of her life. As she confronted polio, Carlson engaged in musical activities. She began writing religious compositions, meant to teach others with physical disabilities. She used crutches and walkers to deliver speeches or lectures.

After graduating from DeVilbiss High School, Carlson enrolled in DePauw University, where she received a scholarship. After a fall shortly after her arrival, Carlson enrolled in Oberlin College to be closer to her family, attending from 1949 to 1952. She went on to earn her bachelor's degree from the University of Toledo in 1954. Carlson was offered and accepted the directorship of a new high school program associated with the university, the Charles Feilbac School for Orthopedically Handicapped.

Carlson enrolled in the Hartford Seminary, where she earned her Master of Arts degree in 1960. She gained notoriety due to her students' success in graduating with degrees that provided them with job opportunities. She then worked as an associate professor at Defiance College until 1974. In 1961, she was hospitalized with polio again.

Carlson returned to school to earn her Ph.D. from the University of Pittsburgh (1967). In 1968, Carlson published The Unbroken Vigil: Reflections on Intensive Care, describing her moments of despair and pain. She also described the care-taking of herself and polio patients, which was up to that time not commonly described in the medical literature. The book became required reading in some medical school and religious seminary courses.

== Ministerial research and work ==
Carlson was interested in helping people with disabilities, leading to an interest in gerontology. She designed a sabbatical program to learn how churches addressed the aging population's needs and spent her sabbatical with a United Church of Christ church, Church of the Beatitudes, in Phoenix, Arizona. In 1972, she began developing gerontology programs and facilities and writing hymns and sermons addressing the field. In 1974, Carlson moved to Phoenix, to run services at the Beatitudes campus and work as an Associate Minister.

In 1979, Carlson was ordained by the United Church of Christ. In 1981, she founded the Beatitudes Center for Developing Older Adult Resources (Center DOAR, renamed "Duet: Partner In Health & Aging" in 2005), a non-profit providing the homebound elderly with free in-home services to help them stay in their homes longer. She served as Center DOAR's Executive Director from 1981 to 1995.

Carlson continued to write hymns, publishing them in at least twelve major hymnals. In 1986, she published an autobiographical collection of hymns entitled God's Glory.

== Later life and death ==
Carlson spent her final years living at the Beatitudes campus. She died on January 13, 2021, of complications with the COVID-19 virus.

== Publications ==
- Carlson, Dosia. The Unbroken Vigil: Reflections on Intensive Care. United States, John Knox Press, 1968. ASIN B0006BVN90
- Carlson, Dosia. God's Glory. Phoenix: The Beatitudes Center for Developing Adult Resources, 1986
- Carlson, Dosia. God’s Glory II: Hymns. Phoenix: The Beatitudes Center for Developing Older Adult Resources, 1997.
- Carlson, Dosia. Engaging in Ministry with Older Adults. Bethesda, Md.: Rowman & Littlefield Publishers, 1997. ISBN 978-1-56699-186-5.

== Awards ==
- 1983: Antoinette Brown Award for an Outstanding Women Clergy, United Church of Christ
- 1989: Arizona's Woman of Distinction
- 2022: Arizona Women's Hall of Fame
