= Toledo City School District =

School district in Ohio, United States

Address
- 1609 North Summit Street Toledo, Lucas, Ohio, 43604; United States
- Coordinates: 41°39′56″N 83°34′31″W

District information
- Type: Public
- Grades: PreK-12
- Superintendent: Romules Durant
- Deputy superintendent(s): Jim Gant, James Gault
- School board: 5 members
- Chair of the board: Stephanie Eichenberg
- Schools: 56
- Budget: $447.3 million (2017-2018 school year)
- NCES District ID: 3904490
- Affiliation: The Ohio 8

Students and staff
- Students: 21,290 (2024–2025)
- Teachers: 1,401.20 (on an FTE basis) (2024–2025)
- Staff: 2,793.00 (on an FTE basis) (2025–2026)
- Student–teacher ratio: 15.19 (2025–2026)

Other information
- Treasurer: Ryan Stechschulte
- Asst. Superintendents: Linda Meyers, Brian Murphy
- Vision: "Become an "A" Rated school district whose graduates are college and career ready."
- Website: www.tps.org

Toledo Public Schools, also known as Toledo City School District, is a public school district headquartered in Toledo, Ohio, in the United States. The district encompasses 70 square miles, serving students of the city of Toledo. Toledo Public Schools (TPS), serves 23,324 students (2018-2019 school year) and is the fourth largest district in the state. Since 2013, TPS has experienced growth in student enrollment from 21,353 students to 23,324 for the 2018-2019 school year.

The district has seen the graduation rate improve 7.5 percent since 2014. The 4-year graduation rate for students who entered the 9th grade in 2014 and graduated by 2017 was 71.4 percent. The 5-year graduation rate for students who entered the 9th grade in fall of 2013 and graduated by the summer of 2017 was 78.5 percent.

TPS budget includes local, state, federal, and other funds, totaling more than $447.3 million (2017-2018 school year). The majority (63.2 percent) of the districts budget comes from state funding, 22.4 percent from local sources, and 11.5 percent from federal funds. In 2018, TPS was the regions fifth largest employer behind ProMedica Health System, Mercy Health Partners, The University of Toledo, and Fiat Chrysler, with 4373 employees. The district employees 1835 teachers (2018) who are represented by the Toledo Federation of Teachers. Other district staff are part of the Toledo Association of Administrative Personnel and The American Federation of State, County and Municipal Employees (AFSCME).

Dr. Romules Durant became the district's superintendent on August 1, 2013.

== School uniforms ==
Students are allowed to wear any solid colored polo and certain types of pants. High school as of 2016-2017 school year and on are allowed to wear anything.

== Schools ==
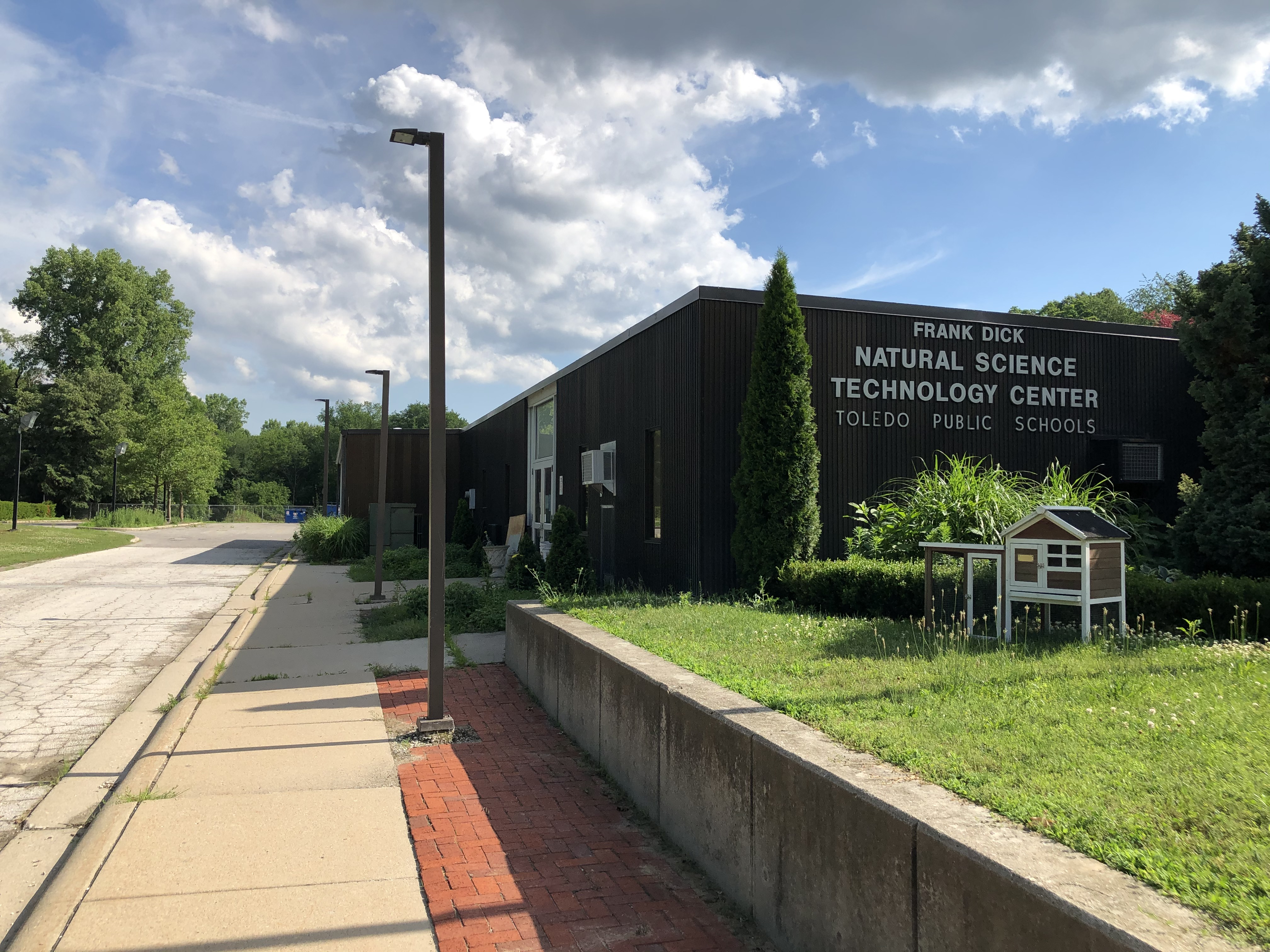
The Natural Science Technology Center is used to teach topics such as Urban agriculture, Animal science, and Hydroponics.

=== Grades 9-12 ===
- Bowsher High School
- Rogers High School
- Scott High School
- Start High School
- Toledo Early College
- The Toledo Pre-Medical and Health Science Academy
- Toledo Technology Academy
- Waite High School
- Woodward High School

Grades 7-12

- Aerospace & Natural Science Academy of Toledo
- Jones Leadership Academy of Business

‘’’Grades 5-12’’’

- Westfield Achievement

Former/Closed High Schools

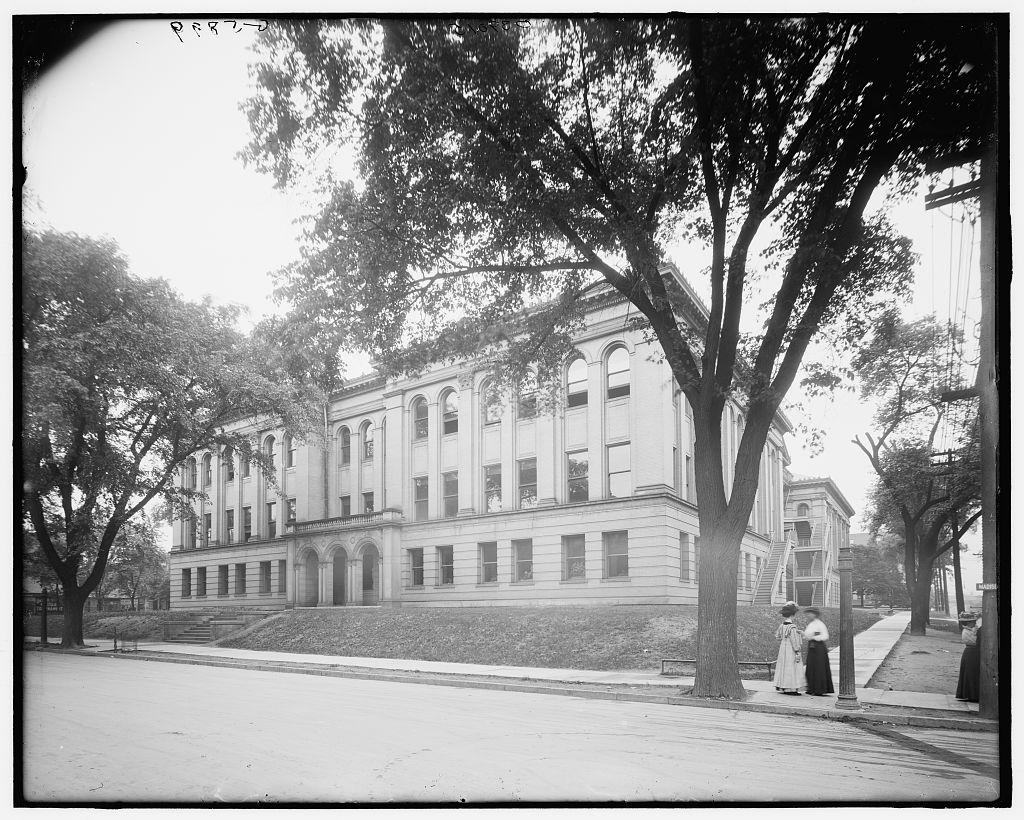
Central High School

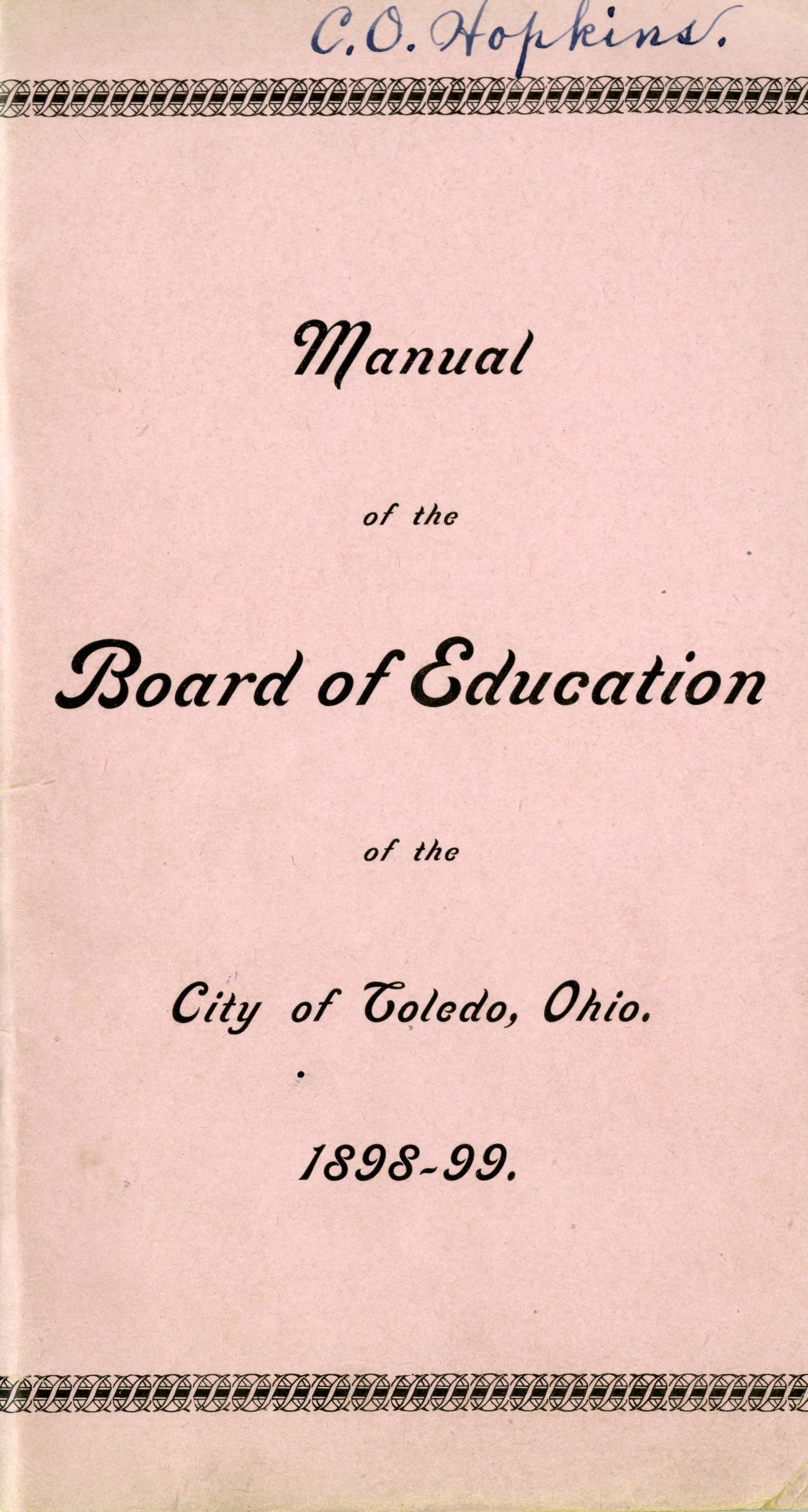
Cover for the 1899-1900 Toledo Board of Education Manual

- Central (Toledo) High School (1853-1938)
- DeVilbiss High School (1931-1991)
- Jefferson Center for Vocational Rehabilitation (1970-2000)
- Libbey High School (1923-2010)
- Macomber High School (1938-1991)
- Nexus Academy (-2017)
- Whitney High School (1939-1991)
- Spencer-Sharples High School (part of the district from 1967 to 1980)

=== Grades K-8 ===
- Byrnedale Elementary School
- Burroughs Elementary School
- Chase Elementary School
- Deveaux Elementary School
- East Broadway Elementary School
- Glendale-Feilbach Elementary School
- Harvard Elementary School
- Leverette Elementary School
- Longfellow Elementary School

Pre-Schools K-8 some in 2011-2012 will not be open

- Arlington Elementary School
- Beverly Elementary School
- Birmingham Elementary School
- Crossgates Elementary School (Preschool Only)
- East Side Central Elementary School (Closed)
- Edgewater Elementary School
- Ella P. Stewart Academy for Girls
- Elmhurst Elementary School
- Fulton Elementary School (Closed, 1894-2010)
- Garfield Elementary School
- Glenwood Elementary School
- Hawkins Elementary School
- Keyser Elementary School
- Lagrange Elementary School (Closed)
- Lincoln Academy for Boys (Closed)
- Marshall STEM Academy
- Martin Luther King for boys (PreK-6)
- McKinley STEMM Academy
- Mc Tigue Elementary School
- Nathan Hale Elementary School (Closed)
- Navarre Elementary School
- Oakdale Elementary School
- Old Orchard Elementary School
- Pickett Elementary School
- Raymer Elementary School
- Reynolds Elementary School
- Riverside Elementary School
- Robinson Elementary School
- Rosa Parks Elementary School
- Sherman Elementary School
- Spring Elementary School
- Walbridge Elementary School
- Westfield Elementary School
- Whittier Elementary School

=== Grades K-8 ===
- Escuela Smart Academy (PreK-6)
- Grove Patterson Academy
- Larchmont K-7 (adding a grade each year) (K-8 in 2011-2012)
- Old West End Academy
- Ottawa River

== History ==
(collected from the Woodward Technical High School yearbook 1927-28)

In 1853, the first Toledo high school was built on the block surrounded by Adams, Madison, Michigan, and 10th streets (currently occupied by the Toledo-Lucas County Public Library). The building was finished in 1857 and the first class graduated from Toledo High School in 1858. After a fire in 1895, the school was rebuilt and renamed Central High School.

In 1872, Jesup W. Scott selected a body of trustees to establish a "University of Arts and Trades" for the city of Toledo. A donation of $15,000 by trustee William H. Raymond in 1873, followed by a donation of $50,000 by Scott's family following his death on January 22, 1874 helped set up a school of design in the original high school by January 1875.

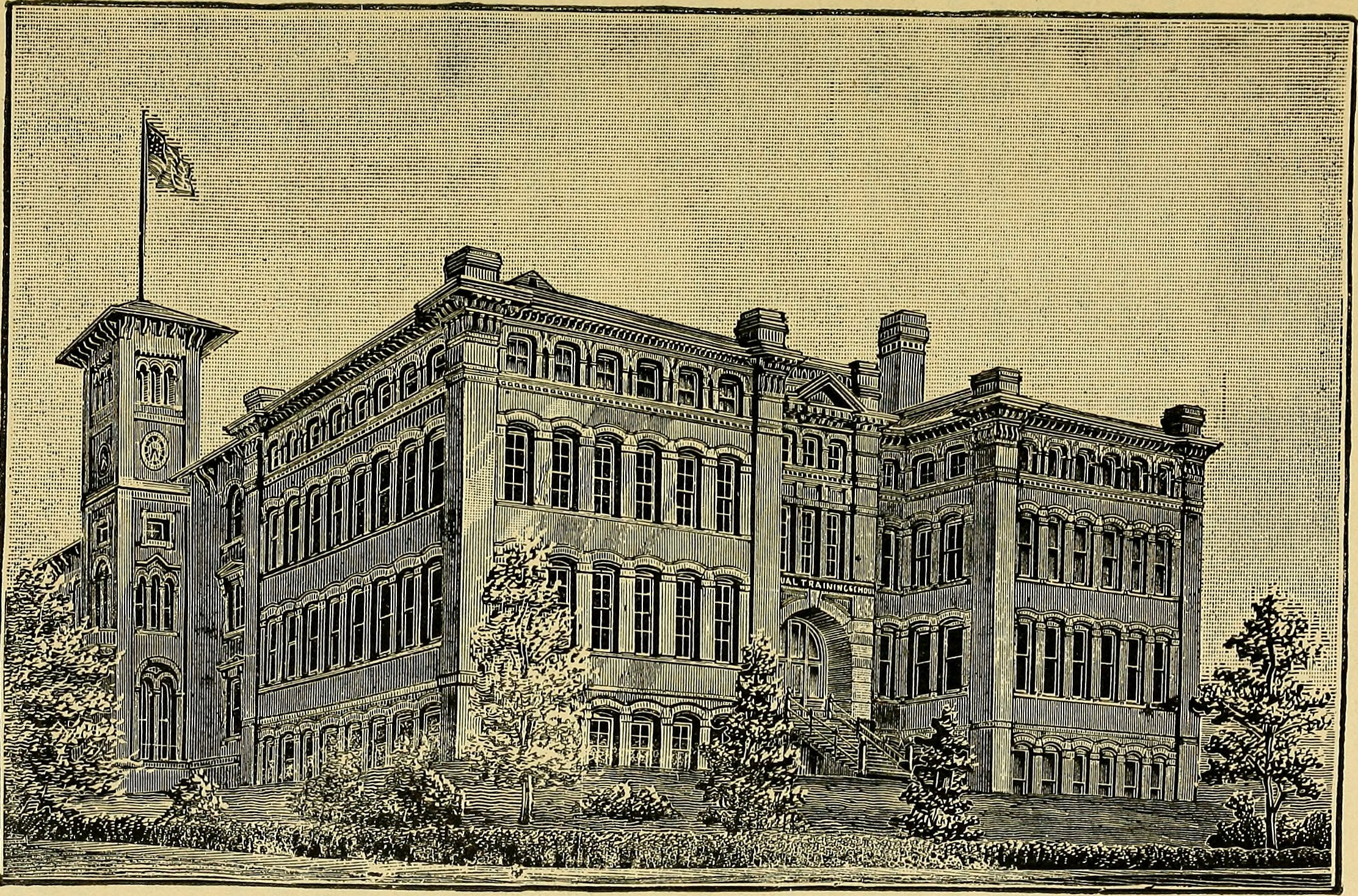
The Manual Training School

Unable to carry out the wishes of donors, the trustees tendered the property to the city of Toledo in January 1884. The Scott Manual Training School was opened and had the distinction of being one of the first such schools to offer courses in Domestic Science. The building was destroyed by a fire in March 1885, but was rebuilt as a much larger structure in 1886 with sixty-one rooms and an auditorium that was larger than the original building.

Until 1913, this was the city's only high school building except for a few years where the first two years of high school were offered at East Side Central. Students were eventually transferred over to Jesup W. Scott High School in 1913 and Morrison R. Waite High School (named for Justice Morrison Waite) in 1914 when these schools were opened.

In January 1912 the Elementary Industrial School was established within the Central building with an emphasis on mechanical drawing and woodwork. When the remaining high school students left for Waite, the industrial school sought a new name. The new school was named Woodward Junior High School for Calvin M. Woodward, an advocate of manual training. When the school added four-year classes, it became Woodward Technical High School.

With four high schools established by 1923 (Scott in the west end, Waite in the east side, Woodward Tech near the north, and Central Catholic near downtown), a suitable high school was necessary for the south end. Edward Drummond Libbey High School was built and named for the Libbey Glass founder and Toledo Art Museum creator who gave money for the school's property on Western Avenue.

In 1927, Vocational High School was established in the Woodward Tech building as well. Woodward Tech would move into a new building on Streicher Street in 1928 and become Calvin M. Woodward High School. Vocational High School remained in the old building until 1938 when it moved into a new location on Monroe Street and became Irving E. Macomber Vocational High School.

In 1931, Thomas A. DeVilbiss High School was also built in the quickly-expanding west end and named for a local industrialist. Harriet Whitney Vocational High School was also established in 1939 as a girls' trade school, and it would eventually become joint-operational with Macomber in 1959.

In April 1937, Woodward High School displayed a Tesla Coil formerly owned by Nikola Tesla to the public, which they had acquired for educational purposes.

As Toledo continued to grow, so did its school district. Two more high schools were opened in 1962: E.L. Bowsher High School was named for a former TPS superintendent to ease crowding at Libbey, and Roy C. Start High School was named for a former Toledo mayor in order to ease crowding at DeVilbiss. When Toledo fully annexed Adams Township in 1964, TPS also acquired Robert S. Rogers High School into its system in 1966. In January 1968, the Ohio General Assembly allowed TPS to annex Spencer-Sharples School District despite it not being geographically connected to the rest of the district. In 1970, the Jefferson Center was set up in the old downtown post office as an alternative high school for students with behavioral issues.

Shortly after its great rise, enrollment numbers began to drop across the district as Toledo's population started to fall. Spencer-Sharples High School was closed in 1980. Macomber and the Jefferson Center were threatened with closure in 1989, but it wasn't until a levy failed during the 1990-91 school year when DeVilbiss and Macomber high schools were closed. Many of Macomber's trade classes were sent to other high schools while the Toledo Technology Academy was opened in DeVilbiss. The Jefferson Center was shut down in 2000, and Libbey was also closed in 2010.

TPS was able to rebuild, renovate, and reorganize many of its school buildings in the early years of the 21st century with help from the State of Ohio. Many neighborhood grade schools were lost, but the school communities were given state-of-the-art facilities.
