= Carl James Joseph =

American itinerant preacher

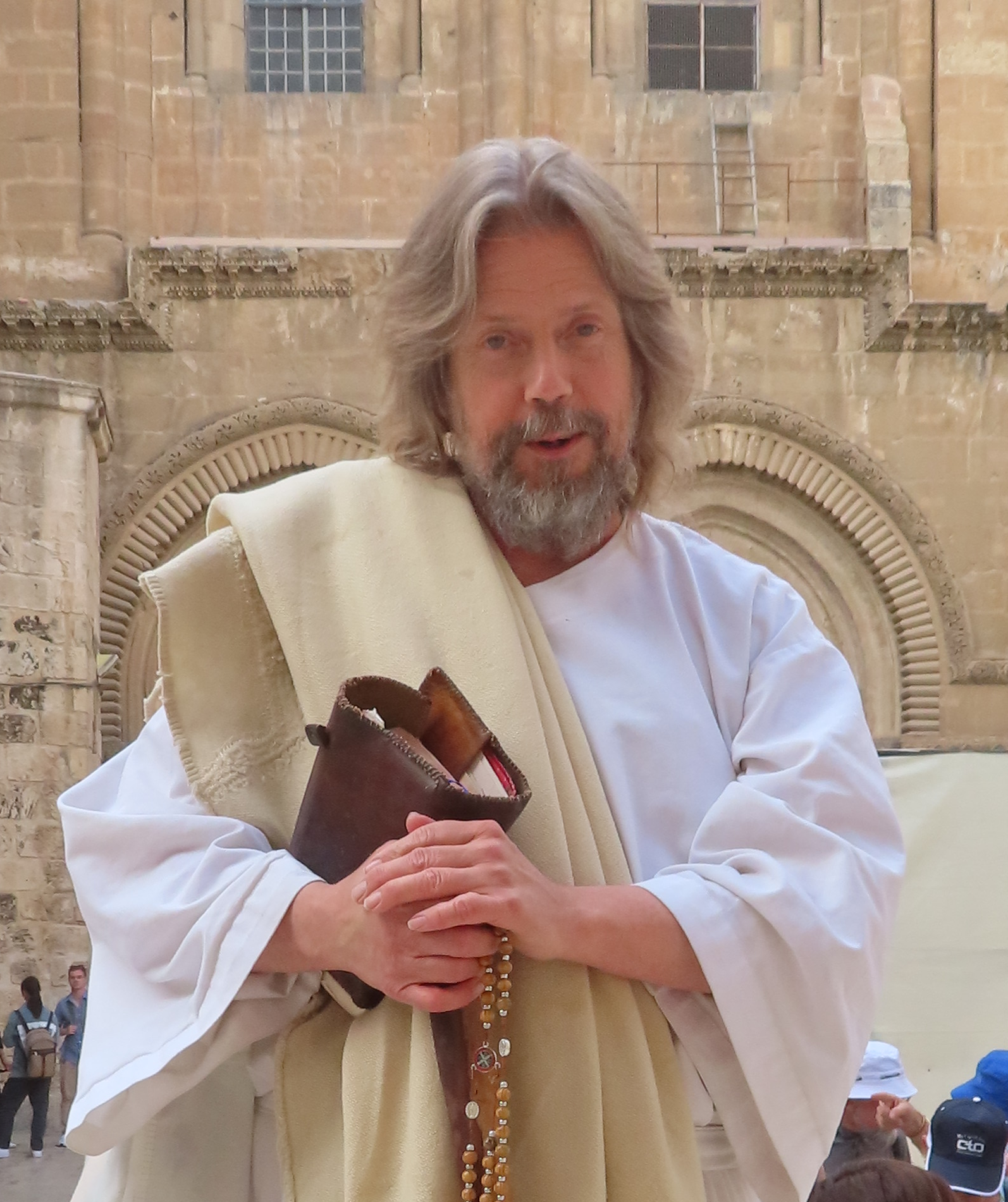
- Joseph outside the Church of the Holy Sepulchre in 2022
- Born: 1960 or 1961 (age 65); Detroit, Michigan, U.S.
- Other names: The Jesus Guy; The Appalachian Apostle
- Occupation: Itinerant preacher
- Years active: 1991–present
- Known for: Dressing and living similarly to Jesus

Carl James Joseph (Note: Joseph prefers to go by his middle and last name.) (born c. 1961 (Note: His year of birth is unclear. He has been reported as 64 in 2025 and 46 in 2007, and graduated from high school in 1978. However, he was also said to be 51 in 2015.)), nicknamed the "Jesus Guy", is an American itinerant preacher. After leaving his corporate job in 1991, Joseph began wandering by foot throughout the United States and internationally. Since 2010, he has lived in the Holy Land and since around 2015 lives at the Church of the Holy Sepulchre in Jerusalem.

== Early years ==
Carl James Joseph was born around 1961 to Louis and Bette Joseph in Detroit, Michigan, and moved to Toledo as a child. Although he grew up in an irreligious family, he attended the Catholic Gesu Elementary School. At age twelve, he and his older brother were baptized as Catholics. After attending St. John's Jesuit High School for three years, Joseph graduated from Bowsher High School in 1978. He was confirmed a year later.

== Itinerant life ==
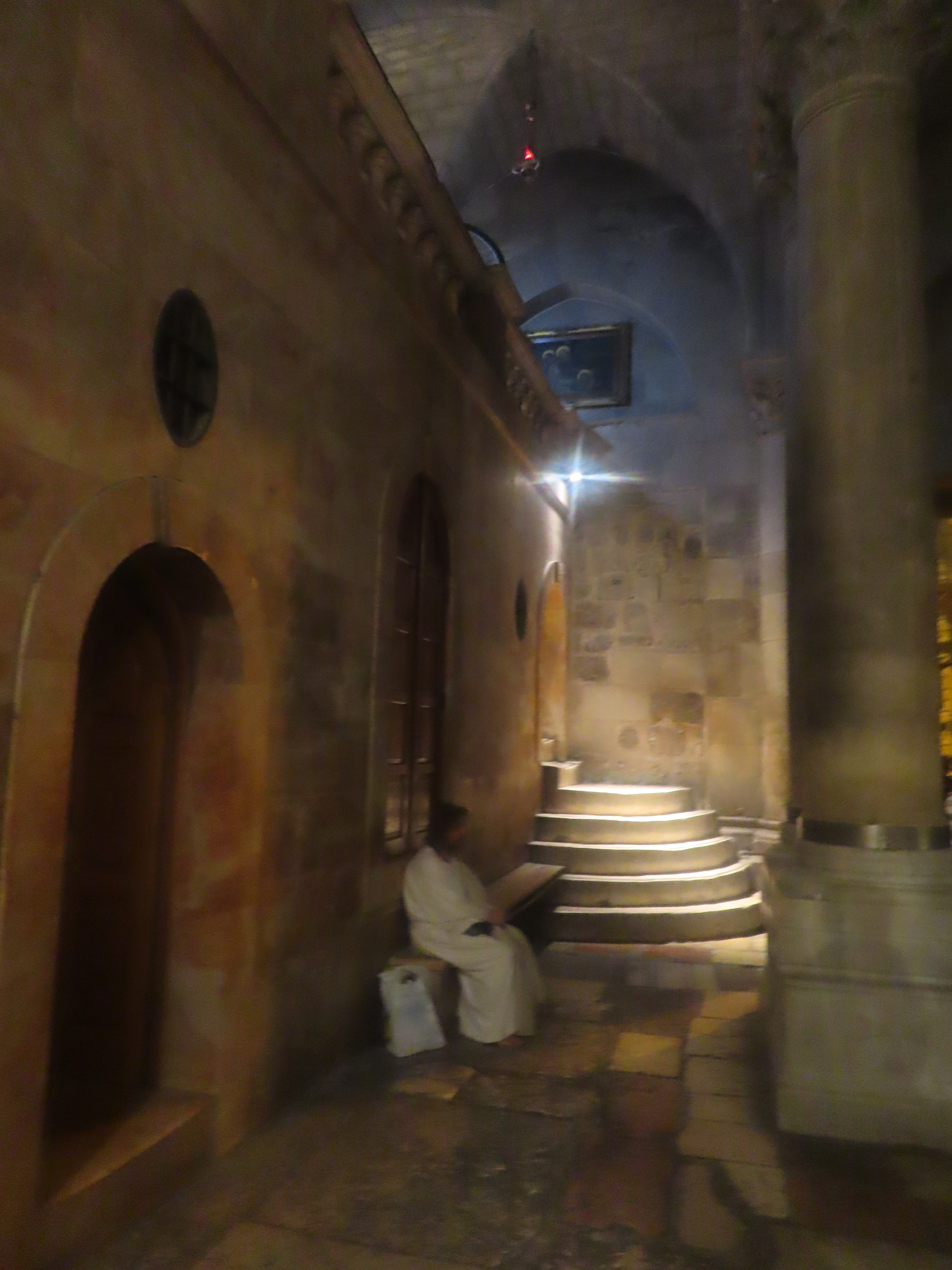
Joseph sitting in the Church of the Holy Sepulchre in 2019

After finding an office job working at a Christian organization in New York City stifling, Joseph began a wandering lifestyle in May 1991. Wearing no shoes and a white robe, he began wandering throughout the United States, Mexico, and other countries. In 1999, he was deported from Mexico after officials became concerned by the large crowds following him. He was arrested on August 29, 1999, in Greenfield, Ohio, for disorderly conduct. While he was preaching on a sidewalk, the crowd spilled into the street; when police asked him to move, he refused. In October 1999, he arrived in the Coal Region of Pennsylvania, where Time magazine reported on him, calling Joseph the "Appalachian Apostle". Joseph moved to Jerusalem in 2010, and, as of 2025, had lived at the Church of the Holy Sepulchre in Jerusalem for most of the preceding decade. He traveled to Philadelphia for Pope Francis's 2015 visit to the United States.

Considering himself both an evangelist and pilgrim, Joseph only carries a Bible, rosary, and toothbrush. He attempts to live entirely by providence. With a full beard, flowing hair, and long robe, his appearance has been called "Jesus-like"; however, Joseph states that he is not trying to portray Jesus, nor does he claim to be Jesus.

A documentary entitled The Jesus Guy about Joseph was released in 2007.

== See also ==
- Christians in Palestine
