= Bowsher High School (Toledo, Ohio) =

Public, coeducational high school in Toledo, Ohio, United States

E. L. Bowsher High School
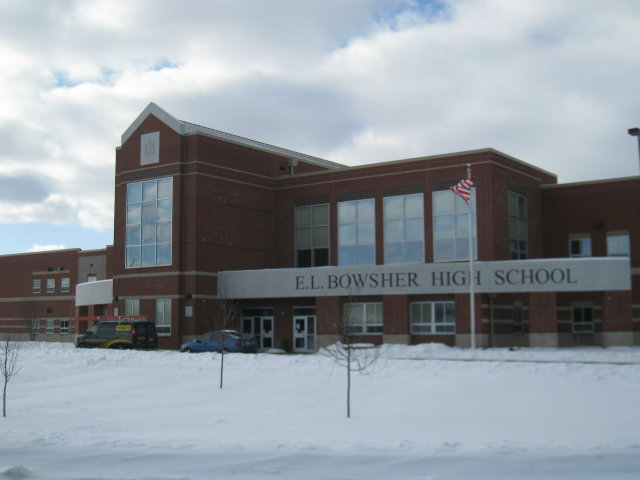

Location
- 2200 Arlington Avenue; Toledo, (Lucas County), Ohio 43609; United States; 41°37′28″N 83°35′55″W

Information
- Type: Public, Coeducational high school
- Opened: 1962
- School district: Toledo City School District
- Superintendent: Dr. Romulus Durant
- Principal: Cori Boos
- Grades: 9-12
- Enrollment: 1,348 (2021–22)
- Colors: Red & Columbia Blue
- Athletics conference: Toledo City League
- Team name: Blue Racers
- Accreditation: North Central Association of Colleges and Schools
- Athletic Director: Terry Reeves
- Website: http://www.tps.org

E.L. Bowsher High School was constructed in the early 1960s at the intersection of Glanzman and Detroit in Toledo, Ohio. Its replacement (opened 2009) is at the corner of Arlington and Detroit, north of the original site. It is part of the Toledo Public Schools.

== Background ==
Bowsher High School's original building opened in September 1962 at 3548 S. Detroit Avenue, just north of Glanzman Road. It was named for Edward Leslie Bowsher (1890–1974), Superintendent of the Toledo Public Schools from the late 1930s until his retirement in 1958. A new structure was built as a replacement at the corner of Detroit and Arlington, about 1.5 miles north of the original location, opening for students at the start of the 2008/2009 school year. It is home to the Blue Racers and has about one thousand four hundred students. The construction of the new school is part of Toledo Public Schools' "Building for Success" program, which aims to renovate the majority of Toledo Public's schools by 2010. The class of 2009 became the first graduating class of the new building. The current Athletic Stadium will stay and not be moved to the new location. As of October 2010 the student population of Bowsher was at around 1,400 students, the jump in enrollment was mainly due to the closing of Libbey High School.

== Marching Band ==
Bowsher High School's band is known as the TBA. They perform at the football games (pregame, halftime, and during the game), the basketball games, known as the Pep Band. Their uniform colors are the same of the school colors, red and Columbia blue. The colors changed slightly, putting the color black in the uniform. The Pep Band has been canceled due to the budget cuts from Toledo Public Schools.

== Clubs and activities ==
Bowsher offers several after school activities: Bible Study, Knitting club, Language clubs, dancing, etc. The school's Latin Club is a local chapter of both the Ohio Junior Classical League (OJCL) and National Junior Classical League (NJCL). The school's German Club has a partnership with Toledo's sister city Delmenhorst, Germany. Every year during October German students will come to the school, and see some of the United States. During the following summer, students from both the program and the German classes will visit Delmenhorst.

== Mascot controversy ==
Though the school's mascot has been Rowdy the Rebel since the school's opening in the 1960s, students and alumni in recent years have been arguing in favor of changing the mascot, which is a Confederate soldier riding a horse. In 2017, the TPS Superintendent Brian Murphy opened discussions regarding the potential change through a post on Facebook. The Facebook post in question, which has since been removed, sparked a passionate debate between current and former students about whether the mascot represented years of oppression. However, a lack of change since 2017 has prompted the community to continue pressing for action. As of June 2020, over 2,000 signatures were collected for a petition to change the mascot officially, with former students offering services to help make the process as cost-effective as possible.

On December 9, 2020, Bowsher High School announced that their new nickname would be the "Blue Racers", which is a type of racer snake that is native to South Toledo and Swan Creek.

== Notable alumni ==
- Lexi Allen, gospel singer and presenter at The Word Network
- A.J. Crew, Hip-Hop artist and producer
- Robert Easter Jr., professional boxer, IBF lightweight world champion
- Kamesha Hairston, retired basketball player for Temple University and the Connecticut Sun
- Dennis Hopson, Former NBA basketball player and the all-time leading scorer for Ohio State Buckeyes men's basketball
- Carl James Joseph, preacher
- Afton Williamson, actress
