= Whitney High School (Toledo, Ohio) =

Former girls vocational public high school in Toledo, Ohio

Whitney Vocational Technical High School
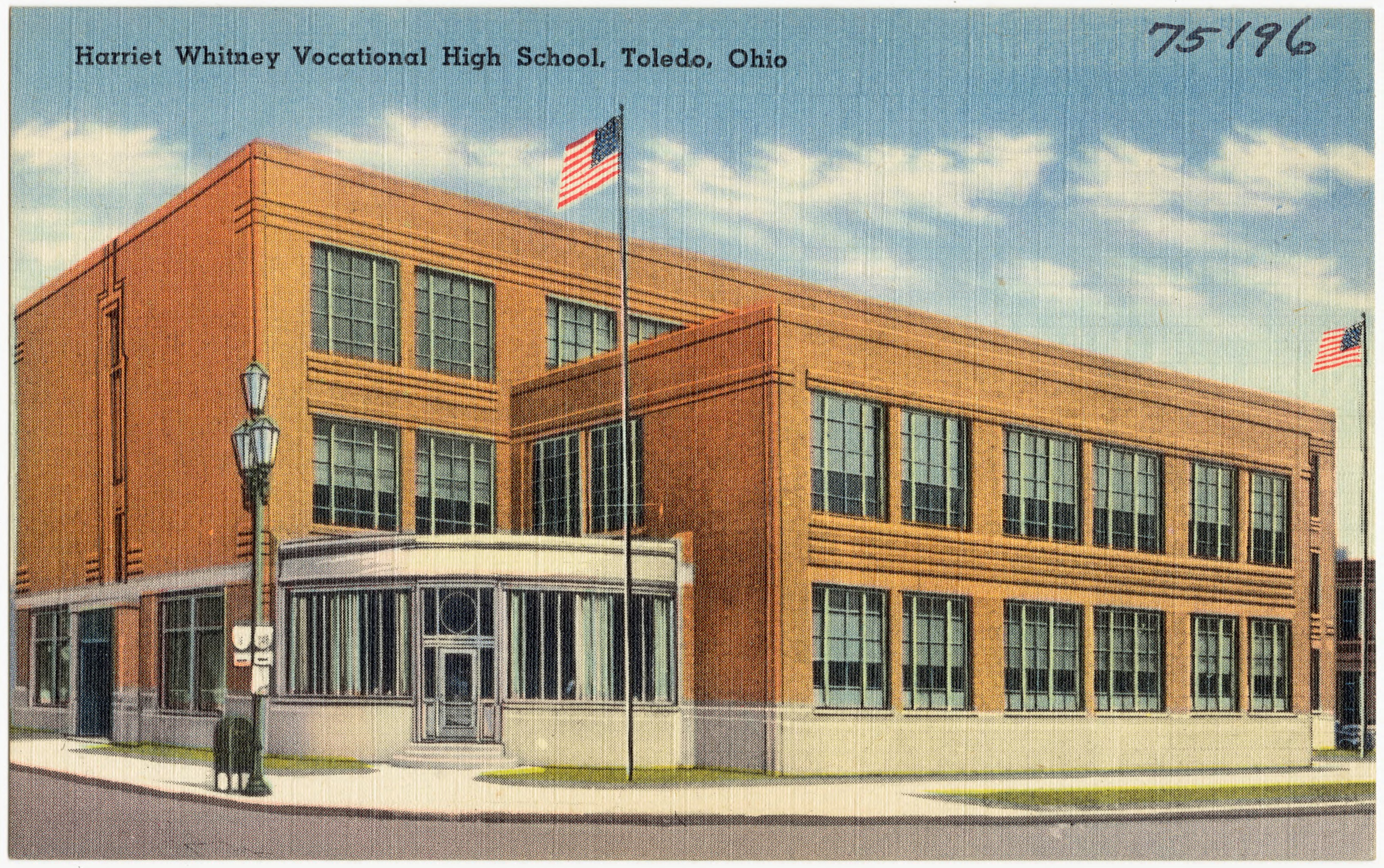

Location
- 1602 Washington Street; Toledo, Lucas Co., Ohio 43604
- Coordinates: 41°39′11″N 83°32′56″W

Information
- Type: Vocational School
- Opened: 1939 (1940 in current building)
- Closed: 1991
- School district: Toledo City School District
- Grades: 9-12
- Colors: Black & Gold
- Athletics conference: Toledo City League
- Nickname: Lady Macs

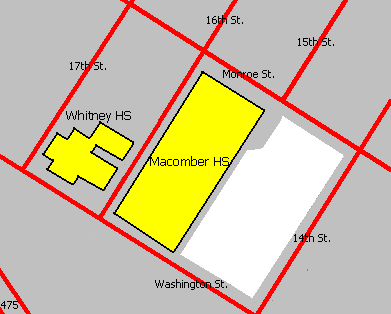
Campus map

Harriet Whitney High School was a girls vocational public high school in Toledo, Ohio from 1939 to June 1991. It served the entire city and was part of the Toledo Public School District. In 1959, the school became joint-operational with Macomber High School, an all-boys vocational school located next door, and the two buildings came to be known as Macomber-Whitney. Despite the fact that they shared an urban campus and some operational efficiencies, the two schools were completely separate in faculties, enrollments, and curriculum until the 1973-1974 school year. In the spring of 1972, an assembly was held for Macomber sophomores. They were told that they could major in one of several programs offered at Whitney, taking core courses at Whitney and other courses required for graduation at Macomber. The available programs included Distributive Education, Business Technology, Marketing, and Data Processing. Some 50 boys signed up. The only change from the assembly announcement was that the boys were transferred completely to Whitney. While the faculty and staff at Whitney had to make some adjustments to accommodate the boys, the program change worked well. The boys did have to undergo some questions from peers, some of whom didn't believe they actually attended Whitney (the most common response was "you mean, Whitmer?"—Whitmer being another co-ed high school in the metro Toledo area. And, even after the former Macomber boys were completely and fully registered as Whitney students, the school newspaper (Whit-Miss) and the yearbook (First Lady) kept their original names from when Whitney was a girls-only school.

The Lady Macs were members of the Toledo City League and donned the colors of black and gold. Prior to their affiliation with Macomber, their school colors were green and white, but they did not compete against other schools in athletics. They only won two league titles: one for track & field in 1987 and one for basketball in the 1990-91 season.

Due to a declining enrollment and low finances, Macomber and Whitney were closed along with DeVilbiss High School by TPS at the end of the 1990-1991 school year. After holding various adult education classes beyond its use as a traditional high school building, the Whitney building was demolished in 2011 by Toledo Public Schools.

== Toledo City League Championships ==
- Basketball: 1990-91
- Track & Field: 1987
