= Toledo Technology Academy =

Toledo Technology Academy of Engineering
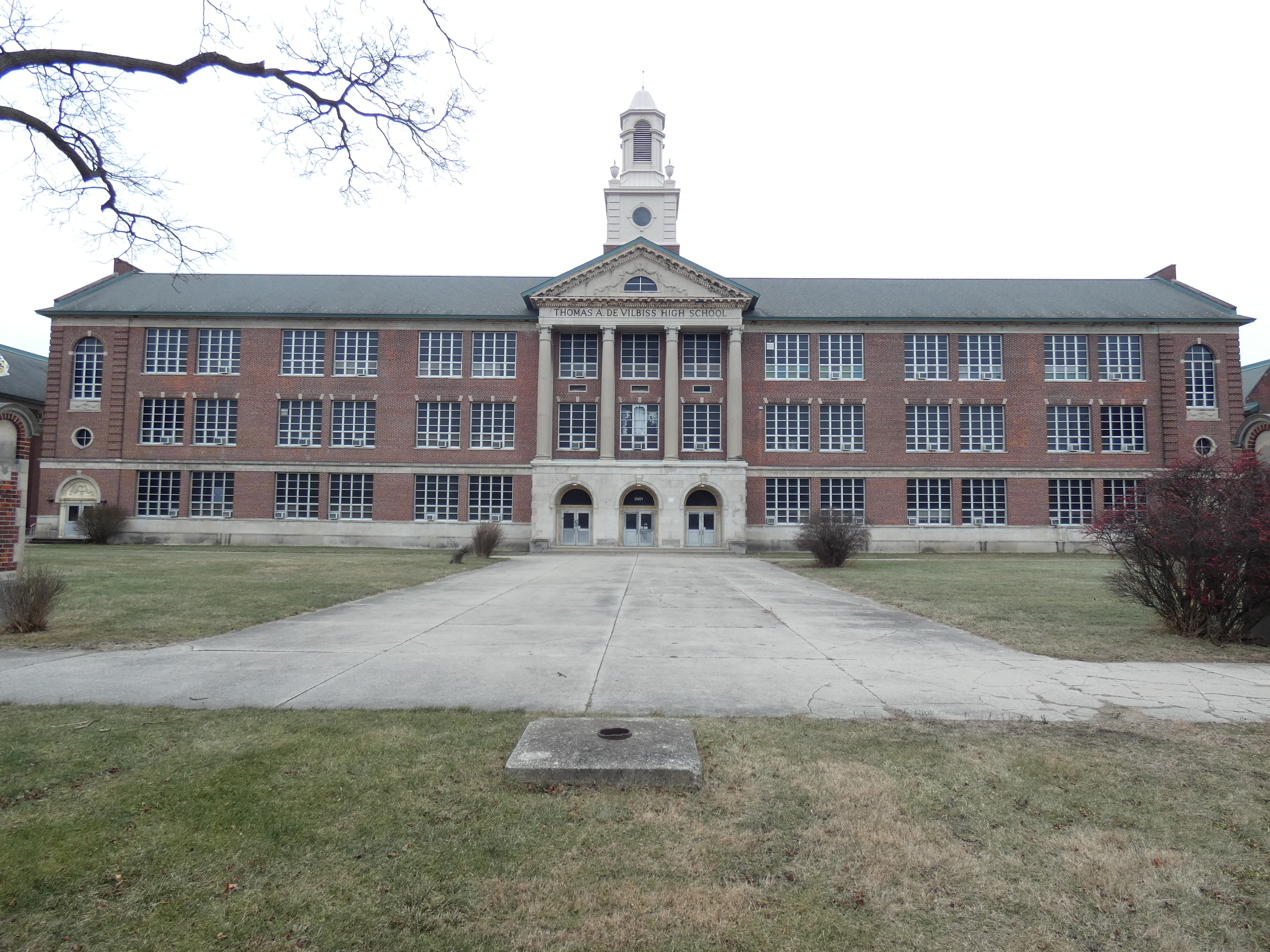

Location
- 3301 Upton Avenue; Toledo, (Lucas County), Ohio 43613; United States
- Coordinates: 41°40′56″N 83°35′27″W

Information
- Type: Public, Coeducational high school
- Motto: We conduct ourselves as if we were in a high tech corporate business environment.
- Established: September 1997
- School district: Toledo City School District
- NCES District ID: 3904490
- Superintendent: Romules Durant
- CEEB code: 365064
- Director: Bryan Bosch
- Assistant Director: David Volk
- Grades: 7–12
- Colours: Grey & Orange
- Slogan: A different kind of school; a different way to learn.
- Athletics: FLL
- Nickname: Tigers
- USNWR ranking: 5,066 (nationally), 190 (in Ohio)
- Average SAT Score: 1210
- Average ACT Score: 25

== Background ==
Toledo Technology Academy of Engineering is a public high school located in Toledo, Ohio. It is part of the Toledo Public Schools. It is located in the former DeVilbiss High School. Many students from surrounding suburban school districts, as well as private schools attend TTAE Toledo Technology Academy students study manufacturing engineering technology integrated with an academic environment. TTA is a magnet school focusing on a manufacturing engineering technology curriculum. TTA offers an academic foundation, four years of science, mathematics, language arts, and three years of social studies education.

== Track record ==
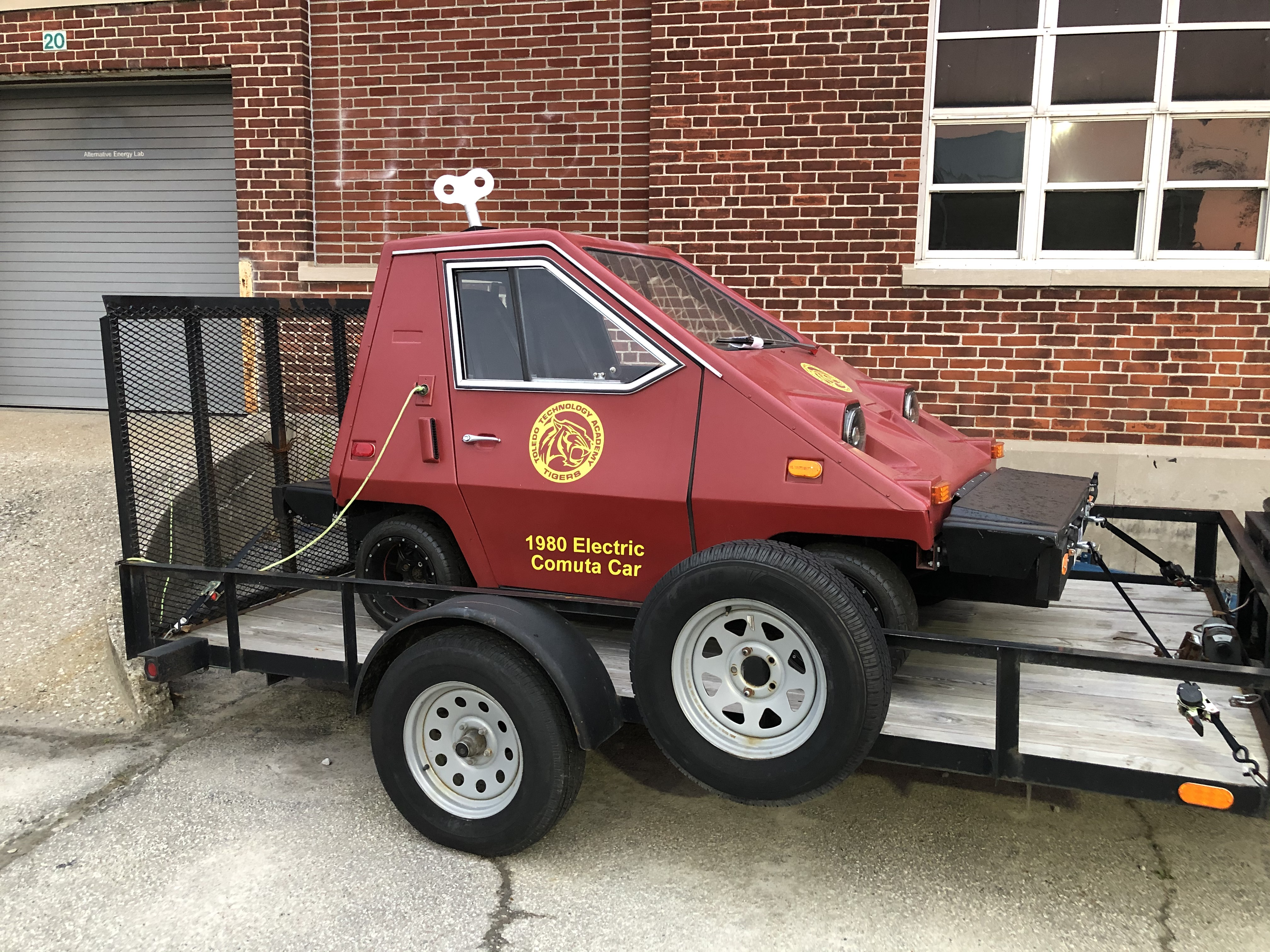
An Commuta Car at Toledo Technology Academy

TTA began as a two-year program within a traditional high school. In 1997, a collaborative partnership was formed with the school system, teaching and administrative unions, area businesses and the United Auto Workers, and a four-year high school was opened. What was found at that time continues to be true today. Technology, manufacturing, and engineering continue to be one of Toledo's largest opportunities for growth. Our small and large manufacturers continually express an ongoing need for well-trained, high-quality, entry-level employees in trade, technical and engineering positions. Increasingly, these entry-level workers need more advanced high tech skills in addition to higher-level thinking/reasoning skills and teamwork experiences. Currently, 75% of the persons applying and/or interviewed for these positions are not qualified. Nationally and regionally schools are preparing only about 30% of this needed workforce. This information was gathered at the National Skill Standards Board meetings and continues to be true.

The mission of the original project was as follows: To support a four-year high school technical program related to Manufacturing Engineering Technology within Toledo Public School Systems known as the Toledo Technology Academy (TTA). TTA's instructional system uses project-based learning, allowing the students to have maximum decision-making responsibility. Skills are taught to support this process and technology is used to support all instruction. TTA provides a complete academic complement of courses for graduation and college entry. Weekly common planning meetings are held to incorporate and integrate instruction. Where appropriate, the academic course content is related to the manufacturing curriculum and vice versa.

== Tech Fusion Team 279 ==
Tech Fusion Team 279 is the FIRST Robotics team located at Toledo Technology Academy. It is open to all Toledo Public Schools students. The team is sponsored by Dana Holding Corporation in Maumee, Ohio. Team 279 had accomplished major achievements in the 21st century.
