= DeVilbiss High School (Toledo, Ohio) =

Coordinates: 41°40′56″N 83°35′33″W

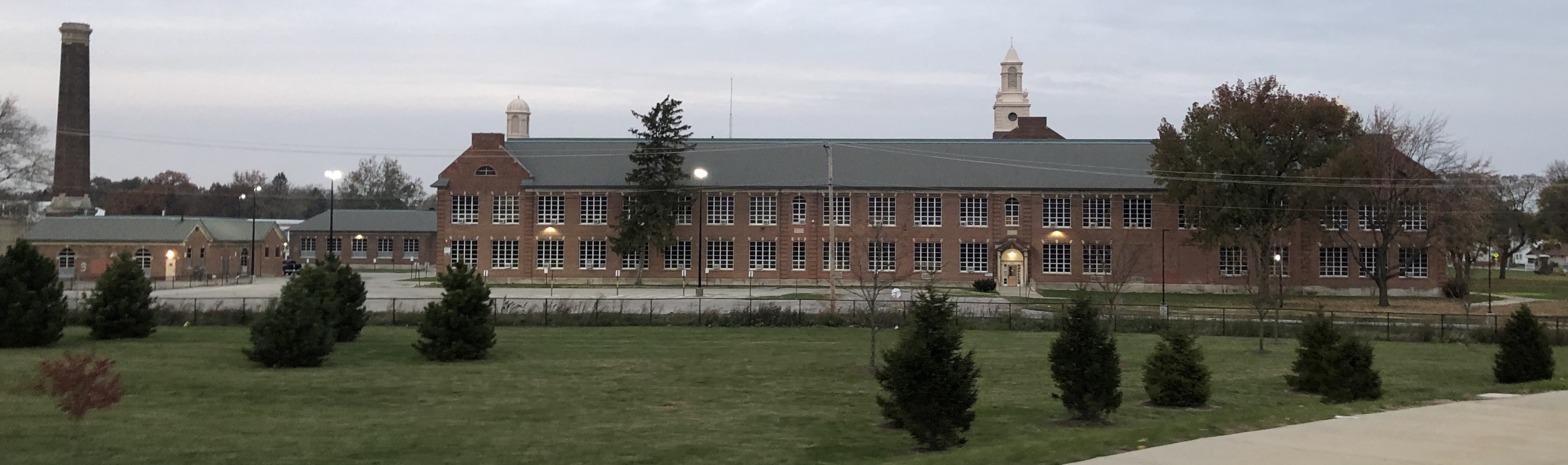

Location
- 3301 Upton Avenue; Toledo, Lucas Co., Ohio 43613

Information
- Type: Public School
- Opened: 1931
- Closed: 1991
- School district: Toledo City School District
- Grades: 9–12
- Colors: Orange & Black, the rainbow
- Athletics conference: Toledo City League
- Nickname: Tigers
- Yearbook: Pot O' Gold

Thomas A. DeVilbiss High School was a public high school in Toledo, Ohio from 1931 to June 1991. It was part of the Toledo Public Schools, serving students from the DeVeaux, Elmhurst, Grove Patterson, Longfellow, Mayfair, McKinley, Nathan Hale, Old Orchard, and Whittier elementary schools. The building sits at 3301 Upton Avenue near the Central Avenue intersection.

== History ==
DeVilbiss opened its doors in 1931 to serve Toledo's growing west side and was built to accommodate 2,400 students. The DeVilbiss Tigers were members of the Toledo City League and donned the colors of orange and black for sporting events. On the contrary, the school colors were the colors of the rainbow, hence the yearbook being the Pot O' Gold, and the school newspaper/newsletter the Prism. Their main rivals were the Start Spartans, although rivalries existed with the St. Francis Knights and the Libbey Cowboys, whom they annually played football against on Thanksgiving day from 1933–1963.

In 1974 DeVilbiss received an obscure salute when 1965 alumnus, and then budding satirist P. J. O'Rourke, along with fellow Ohioan Doug Kenney, used the Pot O’ Gold and DeVilbiss as templates for the National Lampoon 1964 High School Yearbook Parody. That issue contains dozens of direct and indirect references to DeVilbiss and west Toledo. O’Rourke later said that they “… used DeVilbiss because Ohio and Toledo and DHS just seemed so perfectly 1964 American prelapsarian typical…” By “prelapsarian” he meant before the social and political unrest and violence that occurred in the intervening ten years.

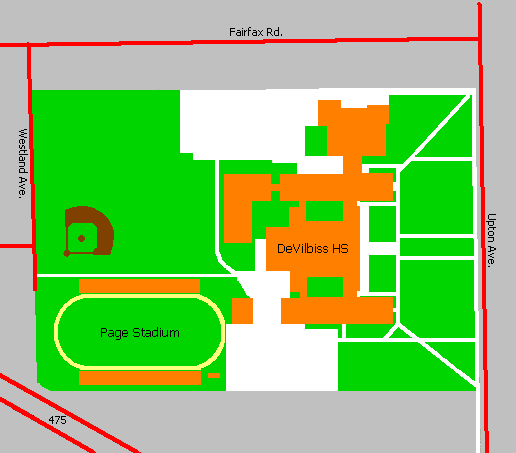
A map of campus

Due to a declining enrollment and low finances, DeVilbiss was closed along with Macomber and Whitney high schools by TPS at the end of the 1990–1991 school year. The DeVilbiss district was split up so students could attend Bowsher, Rogers, Scott, or Start high schools.

In 1999, as the DHS Class of 1960 was preparing for its 40th class reunion, Dave Wise began to assemble a list of 1960 graduates, their addresses and other contact information. By email he shared some high school memories and received many more in return. The give-and-take was great fun and interest in the reunion mushroomed. After the event, communication continued to expand and another 1960 graduate, Ron Thompson, stepped up to help handle composition and assembly. Wise continued to distribute the newsletter and build the alumni database, which came to include DeVilbiss Tiger grads from every year. After about ten years, Thompson adopted the multi-pun name, “Tiger Rag,” for the newsletter. The distribution, which had been as often as once a week, settled down to monthly. As of 2025, the “Tiger Rag” is still published and welcoming new readers.

The DeVilbiss High School building was renovated by Duket Architects and serves as Toledo Technology Academy, which opened in 1997.

DeVilbiss served as the home of Scott High School for two years while Scott's building underwent renovations from 2010–2012.

DeVilbiss' Page Stadium was torn down at the end of May 2012.

== Ohio High School Athletic Association state championships ==
- Boys Cross Country: 1970 Class AAA
- Boys Golf: 1940, 1950
- Boys Track & Field: 1946 (Class A), 1987 (Class AAA)

== Toledo City League Championships ==
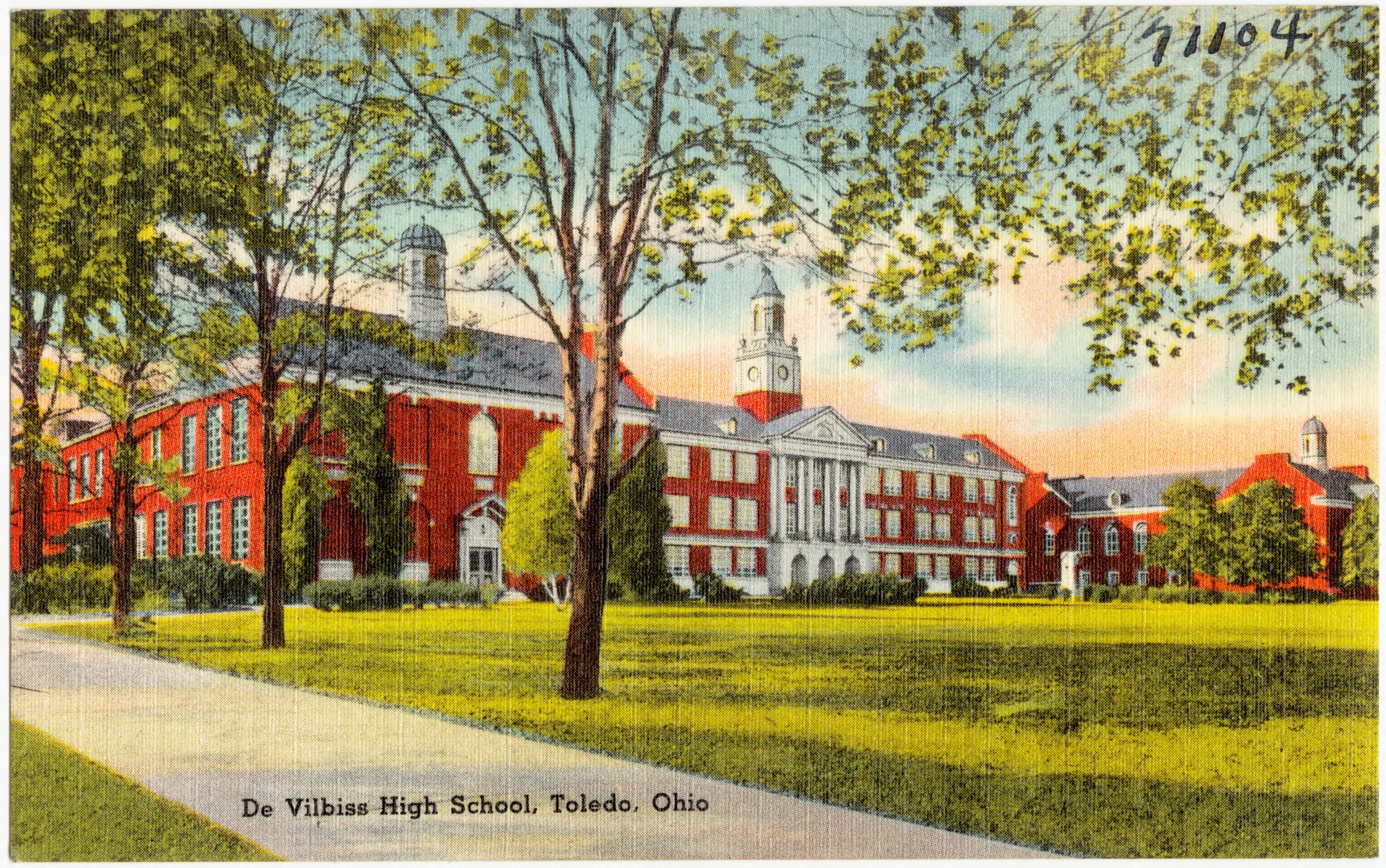
A postcard featuring the building.

- Baseball: 1935, 1936, 1937, 1940*, 1950, 1954*, 1957, 1962, 1964, 1980
- Boys Basketball: 1934–35, 1935–36, 1943–44*, 1949–50, 1951–52*
- Boys Cross Country: 1964. 1965, 1969, 1970, 1971, 1973, 1974, 1975, 1981
- Girls Basketball: 1983–84
- Girls Cross Country: 1984
- Football: 1938*, 1953, 1954, 1955, 1957, 1958, 1959, 1961*, 1973, 1974, 1989
- Boys Track & Field: 1933, 1942, 1943, 1944, 1945, 1946, 1947, 1949, 1951, 1954, 1981, 1982, 1987, 1988, 1989
- Girls Track & Field: 1985, 1986, 1988, 1989
- Volleyball: 1977, 1984, 1986
- Chess: 1973, 1974, 1975
- Golf: 1967
- Tennis: 1962, 1963, 1964, 1967

(years marked with an asterisk (*) denote a shared title)

== Notable alumni ==
- Dusty Anderson actress and WWII-era pin up model
- Jerry Blanton (1974): football player who later starred at the University of Kentucky and then went on to play a long career in the NFL with the Kansas City Chiefs.
- William Blinn (1955): screenwriter of Purple Rain, Roots, Fame, Brian's Song, and Eight Is Enough.
- Bob Chappuis (1941): football player who later starred at the University of Michigan.
- Dosia Carlson: minister, non-profit administrator, and hymnwriter
- Terry Crosby (1975): basketball standout that played for the University of Tennessee and Kansas City Kings.
- Jim Detwiler (1963): football standout who competed for the University of Michigan Wolverines.
- Terry Harmon (1962/3): played baseball at Ohio University and for the Philadelphia Phillies.
- Karen Harper (1963): author
- Lyfe Jennings: R&B singer and songwriter
- Brett Leonard (1977): film director and producer of The Lawnmower Man and Virtuosity; virtual reality and sci-fi tech pioneer
- Jeremy Lincoln (1987): played football for the University of Tennessee and in the NFL for the Chicago Bears, St. Louis Rams, Seattle Seahawks, New York Giants, and the Detroit Lions.
- Ron McDole (1957): played football for the University of Nebraska and in the NFL for the St. Louis Cardinals, Houston Oilers, Buffalo Bills, and the Washington Redskins.
- Bob Meyer Former MLB player (Kansas City Athletics, New York Yankees, Los Angeles Angels, Seattle Pilots, Milwaukee Brewers)
- P.J. O'Rourke (1965): political satirist, journalist, writer, and author.
- Geoff Zahn (1964): baseball player for the University of Michigan and later played for the Los Angeles Dodgers, Chicago Cubs, Minnesota Twins, and California Angels.
- Jack Zouhary (1969): Federal Judge Northwest Ohio.
- Jan Wahl (1948): author of over 100 bestselling children's books, historian of American literature and film.
