= List of people from Toledo, Ohio =

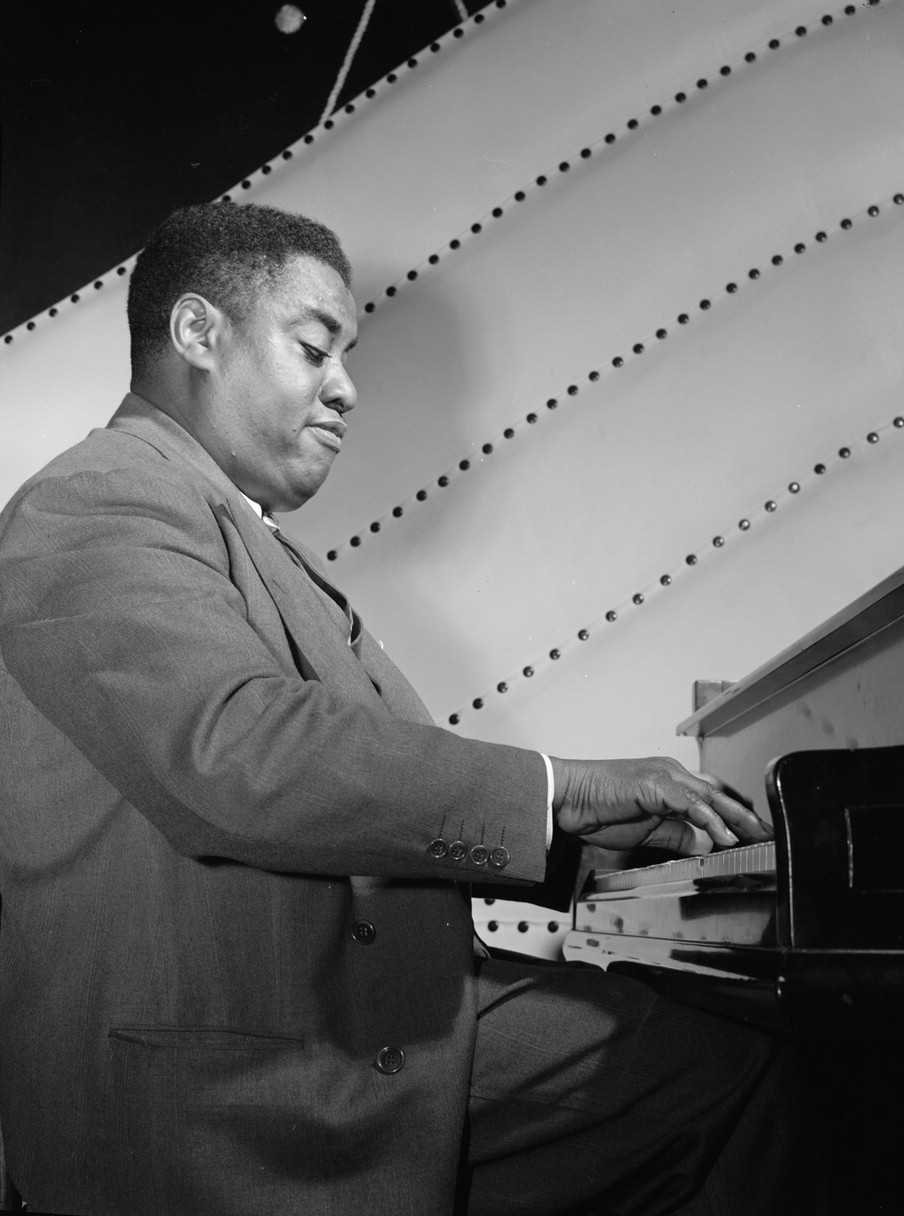
Art Tatum, at the Vogue Room, New York (between 1946 and 1948)

The city of Toledo, Ohio, the largest city and the county seat of Lucas County, Ohio, is the birthplace and home of several notable individuals. This is a list of people from Toledo, Ohio and includes people that were born or lived in Toledo and the surrounding area. Individuals included in this listing are people presumed to be notable because they have received significant coverage in reliable sources that are independent of the subject.

== Arts and entertainment ==
=== Architecture and design ===
- E. O. Fallis – architect with works throughout Ohio, Michigan, and Indiana
- Norman Bel Geddes – industrial designer, Hollywood set designer, noted modernist architect
- Alfred Hahn – architect, contributing designer of Ohio State Office Building
- Timothy Y. Hewlett – architect, artist, member of the American Institute of Architects
- Thaddeus B. Hurd – architect, professor of architecture, historian
- Arland W. Johnson – architect with works throughout the Midwest and New England
- George S. Mills – architect, Fellow of the American Institute of Architects, vice president of American Institute of Architects, founding partner of Mills, Rhines, Bellman & Nordhoff
- John N. Richards – architect, president of the American Institute of Architects
- Lutah Maria Riggs – architect, known for her work in Santa Barbara, California
- David L. Stine – architect with prominent works in Toledo
- Harry W. Wachter – architect, fellow of the American Institute of Architects

=== Art ===
- Israel Abramofsky – modern artist
- Richard DeVore – ceramic artist
- Sheree Hovsepian – Iranian-American collage artist and photographer, raised in Toledo
- Joseph Kosuth – conceptual artist
- Paul Timman – Hollywood tattoo artist

=== Journalism ===
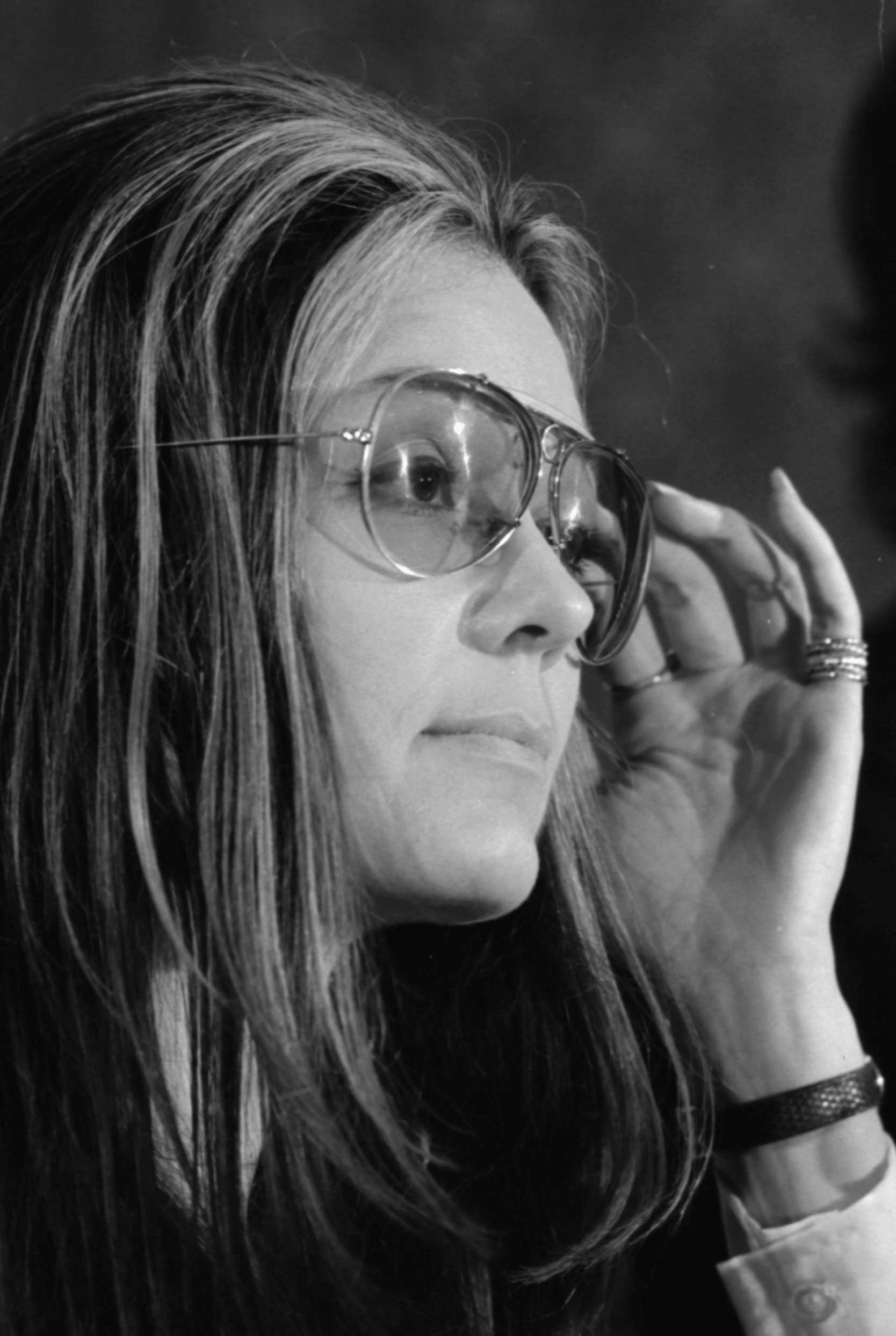
Gloria Steinem, pictured here in 1972, is a feminist icon.

- Emily St. John Bouton – journalist, author, educator
- Amy Braunschweiger – freelance journalist for The New York Times and The Wall Street Journal
- Christine Brennan – USA Today sports columnist; ESPN, ABC, and NPR sports analyst; author of seven books
- Janet Cooke – disgraced journalist, forced to return a Pulitzer Prize for a fabricated story
- Steve Hartman – CBS News reporter
- Louise Markscheffel – journalist, editor, critic
- David Ross Locke – journalist and political commentator during American Civil War under pen name Petroleum V. Nasby
- Claudia Quigley Murphy – journalist, economic consultant, advisory counsel, author
- P. J. O'Rourke – political satirist, journalist, writer
- Gloria Steinem – founder of Ms.; feminist icon; journalist; women's rights advocate
- Hermon Franklin Titus – newspaper publisher, socialist activist

=== Literature and poetry ===
- Mildred Benson – author of the original books in the Nancy Drew series
- Michael Brooks – historian and journalist
- Paul Laurence Dunbar – poet, originally from Dayton, Ohio
- Edward Eager – author of children's books
- Louis Effler – medical writer and doctor
- Mari Evans – author, dramatist
- Sara Rowsey Foley — biographer
- Margaret Wynne Lawless (1847–1926) – poet, author, educator, philanthropist
- Christopher Moore – novelist
- Scott Nearing – conservationist, peace activist, educator, writer
- Allen Saunders – cartoonist, creator of Mary Worth and Steve Roper comic strips
- Scott Smith – novelist, author of A Simple Plan and The Ruins
- Mildred D. Taylor – author of various novels concerning race relations, particularly Roll of Thunder, Hear My Cry and its sequels
- Elizabeth Witherell – editor-in-chief of The Writings of Henry D. Thoreau

=== Modeling ===
- Runa Lucienne – model, actress, social media influencer
- Cynthia Myers – Playboy Playmate, model, actress
- Jan Roberts – Playboy Playmate, model

=== Music ===
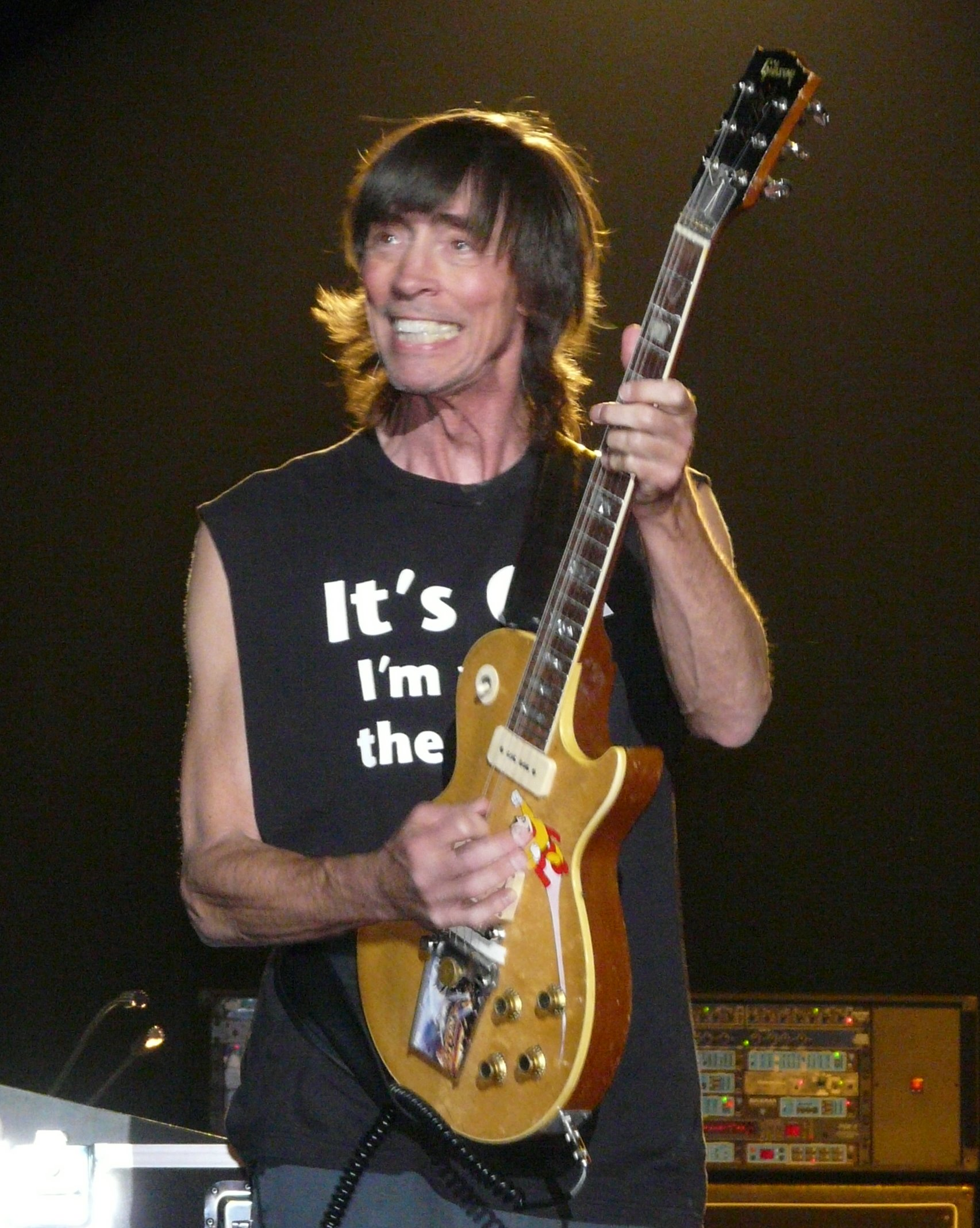
Tom Scholz is the founder of the 1970s rock band Boston.

- Rance Allen – gospel singer
- Anita Baker – R&B singer, eight-time Grammy Award winner
- Crystal Bowersox – singer-songwriter
- Teresa Brewer – singer and actress
- Chris Byrd – gospel singer
- Stanley Cowell – pianist, composer
- Citizen – rock band
- Larry Fuller – jazz pianist
- Jon Hendricks – member of the jazz group Lambert, Hendricks & Ross
- Chester "Lyfe" Jennings – singer
- Johnny and the Hurricanes – rock band
- Koufax – alternative rock band
- Lollipop Lust Kill – heavy metal/alternative band
- Gary Louris – singer and guitarist for The Jayhawks
- Shirley Murdock – R&B singer
- Jeff Nelson – drummer of the punk rock band Minor Threat
- Helen O'Connell – singer and TV personality
- Frank Proffitt – banjoist
- Jim Riggs – musician and music educator, University of North Texas Regents Professor Emeritus of Music
- Sanctus Real – Christian rock band
- Tom Scholz – founder of 1970s rock group Boston
- Scott Shriner – bassist of the rock band Weezer
- Ruby Starr – rock singer
- Static Rituals – alternative rock band
- Stylex – electroclash/new wave band
- Art Tatum – jazz pianist, recipient of Grammy Lifetime Achievement Award
- This Beautiful Republic – Christian rock band
- Cecile Vashaw – composer and music educator
- We are the Fury – alternative rock band
- Mary Zilba – singer

=== Theater and film ===
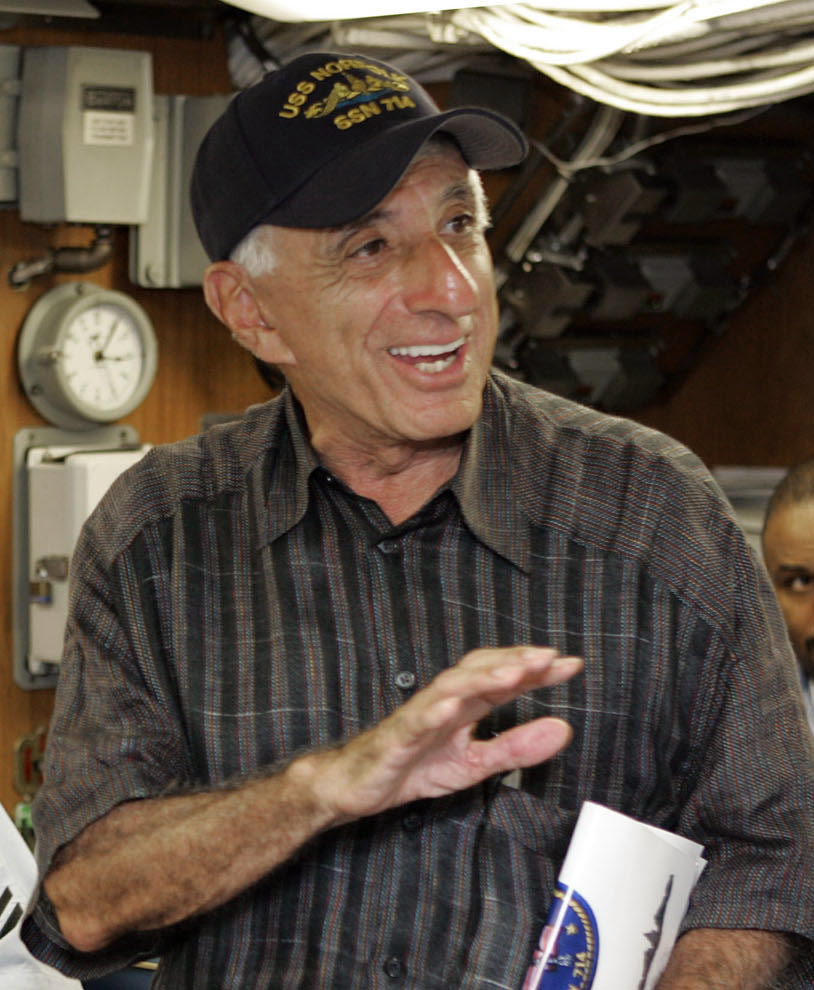
Jamie Farr played Maxwell Klinger on the long-running TV series M*A*S*H.

- Dusty Anderson – actress and model
- Cliff Arquette – actor, comedian, grandfather of David, Patricia, Alexis, and Rosanna Arquette
- Jonathan Bennett – film actor
- Casey Biggs – actor
- William Blinn – screenwriter of Purple Rain, Roots, Fame, Brian's Song and Eight Is Enough
- Pat Brady – actor, born Robert Ellsworth Patrick Aloysious
- Lizze Broadway – film and television actress
- Joe E. Brown – actor, comedian
- Daws Butler – voice actor, voice of Yogi Bear, Huckleberry Hound
- Jason Cameron – actor, television presenter, model
- John Cromwell – actor, film producer and director, father of James Cromwell
- Jason Dohring – actor
- Robert Drew – director and pioneer of cinéma-verité
- Gracie Dzienny – actress
- Dominick Evans – filmmaker and activist
- Jamie Farr – actor
- Teresa Ganzel – actress
- Philip Baker Hall – actor
- Sandy Helberg – film and television actor
- Katie Holmes – actress
- Rich Iott – television and film producer
- Eric Kripke – television writer, director, and producer
- Otto Kruger – actor
- Lenore Lonergan – actress
- Phyllis Welch MacDonald – actress
- Brent Miller – film and television producer
- Shirley Mitchell – radio and television actress
- Cassie Okenka – Broadway actress
- Adrianne Palicki – film and television actress
- Rose La Rose – Burlesque dancer, actress, and theater owner
- Kate Shindle – Broadway actress
- Robert B. Sinclair – film and theater director
- Alyson Stoner – actor and dancer
- Lloyd Thaxton – producer, director, writer, hosted self-titled TV show in 1960s
- Danny Thomas – actor, comedian, singer and father of Marlo Thomas
- Bonnie Turner – creator of That '70s Show and 3rd Rock from the Sun
- Derek Westerman – film director, screenwriter, and producer
- Afton Williamson – television and film actress
- Scott Wozniak – YouTuber, creator, actor, director of Scott the Woz

== Business ==
- Frederick Baldwin Adams – railroad man, banker, philanthropist
- Charles Edmund Beard – president of Braniff International Airways
- George A. Blair – entrepreneur and owner of waterskiing schools
- Thomas M. Connelly Jr. – chemical engineer, exectuve director and CEO of American Chemical Society
- Allen DeVilbiss Jr. – inventor and businessman
- Doug Dohring – former CEO and co-founder of Neopets
- Sarah E. Goode - entrepreneur and inventor
- John E. Gunckel – founder and life president of the Old Newsboys Goodfellow Association
- Samuel M. Jones – oilman, inventor, philanthropist, 32nd mayor of Toledo
- Edward Drummond Libbey – glassmaker, philanthropist, founder of Libbey Incorporated
- Michael Mery – owner of Chico Iron Foundry, inventor and president of the Chico Board of Trustees
- Clement O. Miniger – founder, president, chairman of the board of the Electric Auto-Lite Company, philanthropist
- Daniel H. Overmyer – entrepreneur, warehouse chain operator, and television station founder
- Michael Joseph Owens – inventor, glass manufacturer, founder of O-I Glass
- Anthony Packo – founder of Tony Packo's Cafe
- Jacob J. Rosenthal – theater manager
- Becky Schroeder - inventor and entrepreneur
- Ella P. Stewart – one of the first African-American female pharmacists, business owner, philanthropist
- Frank D. Stranahan – co-founder and treasurer of The Champion Spark Plug Co.
- Robert A. Stranahan – co-founder, president, and chairman of The Champion Spark Plug Co.
- Henry Theobald – founder of the Toledo Scale Company
- John Tiedtke – son of Tiedtke's founder, businessman, philanthropist, professor of economics
- John Willys – automobile manufacturer, founder of Willys (later Jeep), diplomat

== Criminals ==
- Dellmus Colvin – serial killer
- Anthony Cook – serial killer
- Nathaniel Cook – serial killer
- Bruce Alan Davis – serial killer
- Martin Frankel – former financier convicted in 2002 of insurance fraud, racketeering and money laundering
- Donald Harvey – serial killer
- James T. "Jack White" Licavoli – mobster, bootlegger, boss of the Cleveland crime family
- Peter "Horseface" Licavoli – gangster, bootlegger, member of the Purple Gang
- Thomas "Yonnie" Licavoli – gangster, bootlegger, member of the Purple Gang
- Thomas Noe – Republican fundraiser and activist guilty of money laundering for the George W. Bush 2004 presidential campaign and the Coingate scandal
- Gerald Robinson - Roman Catholic priest convicted of murdering a nun

== Government and politicians ==
- Stephen Bolles – U.S. representative from Wisconsin
- Walter Folger Brown – former Postmaster General of the United States
- James M. Comly – United States Minister to Hawaii, postmaster of Columbus, brevet brigadier general
- Doug Ducey – Arizona secretary of the treasury, then governor
- Ernest E. Debs – Los Angeles City Council member and county supervisor, born in Toledo
- Thomas Francis Ford – member of the U.S. Congress, elected to Los Angeles City Council by write-in vote
- Marcy Kaptur – U.S. representative for Ohio's 9th congressional district
- Kristina Keneally – premier of New South Wales, Australia
- Foy D. Kohler – U.S. ambassador to the Soviet Union, assistant secretary of state for European Affairs
- Daniel Poneman – former U.S. deputy secretary of Energy
- Natalie Price – member of the Michigan House of Representatives
- Julia Rice Seney (1853-1915), Toledo post office administrator
- Jason Sheppard – member of the Michigan House of Representatives
- Isaac R. Sherwood – U.S. representative from Ohio's 6th and 9th congressional district, Ohio secretary of state, mayor of Toledo
- Morrison Waite – 7th chief justice of the United States
- Brand Whitlock – mayor and U.S. ambassador to Belgium during World War I

== Military ==
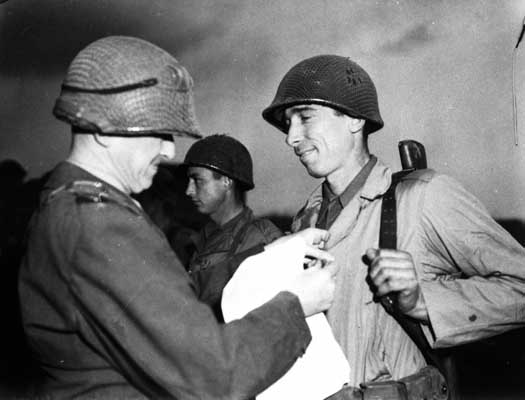
Alexander Drabik being awarded the Distinguished Service Cross by Lieutenant General John W. Leonard, both Toledo natives

- Christian Albert – Medal of Honor recipient (Civil War)
- William Clarence Braisted – Surgeon General of the U.S. Navy
- Edward Byers – U.S. Navy SEAL, Medal of Honor recipient (Afghanistan)
- Robert Craig – Medal of Honor recipient (WWII)
- Charles Doolittle – U.S. Army brevet major general
- Alexander Drabik – first American soldier to cross the Ludendorff Bridge at the Battle of Remagen
- John W. Fuller – U.S. Army brevet major general
- Burke Hanford – Medal of Honor recipient (Boxer Rebellion)
- John S. Kountz – Medal of Honor recipient (Civil War)
- John W. Leonard – U.S. Army lieutenant general
- Carwood Lipton – World War II U.S. Army officer of the 101st Airborne Division who was portrayed in the book and television series Band of Brothers
- Robert H. McMahon – U.S. Air Force major general, assistant secretary of Defense for Sustainment
- William Vance McMaken – U.S. Army major general
- William Alexander Morgan – guerrilla commander in Cuban Revolution, leader of Escambray rebellion
- Peter Navarre – War of 1812 soldier, frontiersmen
- Stephanie Rader – OSS spy in WWII
- James E. Robinson Jr. – Medal of Honor recipient (WWII)
- Webb D. Sawyer – USMC brigadier general
- James B. Steedman – U.S. Army major general
- Ernst Torgler – Medal of Honor recipient (Civil War)
- Oscar J. Upham – Medal of Honor recipient (Boxer Rebellion)

== Science and technology ==
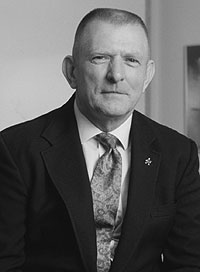
NASA flight director Gene Kranz

- Sean B. Carroll (born 1960), evolutionary developmental biologist
- John Dabiri – engineer and professor at Caltech
- Gerard Gaynor – electrical engineer and IEEE fellow
- Albert William Herre (1868–1962), ichthyologist and lichenologist.
- Eugene F. "Gene" Kranz – retired NASA flight director who served during the Gemini and Apollo space programs, known for his role in the rescue of Apollo 13
- Lyman Spitzer Jr. – theoretical physicist, astronomer, driving force behind the Hubble Space Telescope
- Philip A. Welker – geodetic engineer and civil engineer with the United States Coast and Geodetic Survey
- Michael S. Witherell – particle physicist, former director of Fermilab, and presently director of Lawrence Berkeley National Laboratory

== Sports ==
=== Baseball ===
- A.J. Achter – college baseball coach and former MLB baseball pitcher
- Roger Bresnahan – nicknamed "The Duke of Tralee", Baseball Hall of Fame member, played for New York Giants and also owned Toledo Mud Hens
- Stan Clarke – former pitcher in Major League Baseball
- Gene Cook – longtime executive of Toledo Mud Hens, International League Hall of Fame member
- Jack Hallett – former Major League Baseball pitcher, Chicago White Sox, Pittsburgh Pirates, and New York Giants
- Terry Harmon – former professional baseball player, Philadelphia Phillies
- Brad Hennessey – former professional baseball pitcher, San Francisco Giants
- Addie Joss – nicknamed "the Human Hairpin"; Baseball Hall of Fame pitcher; pitched for Cleveland Naps
- Jim Joyce – former professional baseball umpire
- Bill Laskey – former professional baseball pitcher, San Francisco Giants
- Jim Leyland – former professional baseball player, coach and manager; special assistant to the Detroit Tigers
- Zach McClellan – former professional baseball pitcher, Colorado Rockies
- Zach McKinstry, MLB player, Detroit Tigers, born in Toledo
- Bob Meyer – former Major League Baseball pitcher, New York Yankees, Milwaukee Brewers
- Doug Mientkiewicz – retired professional baseball player, who also served as the manager for the Toledo Mud Hens; one of five American players to win both an Olympic gold medal and a World Series championship
- George Mullin – known by the nickname "Wabash George", baseball pitcher for the Detroit Tigers
- Lee Richmond – pitcher in Major League Baseball; pitched first perfect game in MLB history
- Ron Rightnowar – former major league baseball player, Milwaukee Brewers
- Joey Wiemer - professional baseball outfielder

=== Basketball ===
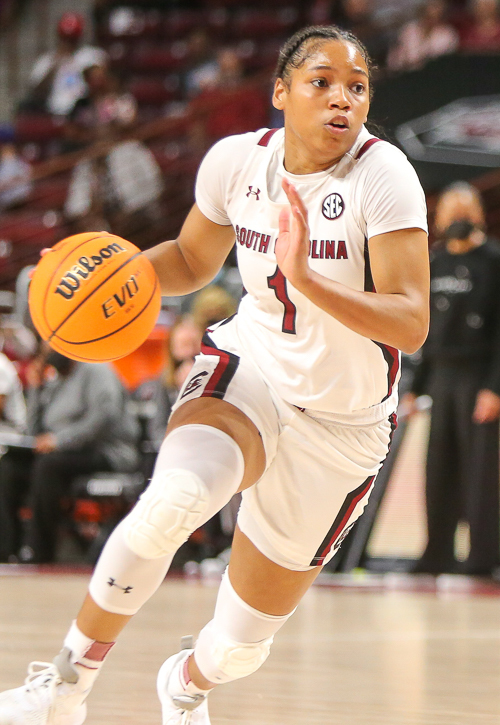
Zia Cooke

- John Amaechi – NBA player
- Sonny Boswell – Inducted into the Naismith Basketball Hall of Fame, class of 2022
- William Buford – Ohio Mr. Basketball in 2008; currently playing for Darüşşafaka Tekfen
- Don Donoher – University of Dayton head coach
- Don Collins – NBA player
- L. J. Cooke – first men's basketball head coach for Minnesota Golden Gophers
- Zia Cooke – WNBA player
- Duke Cumberland – Harlem Globetrotter
- Don Donoher – head coach and athletic director for Dayton Flyers men's basketball; College Basketball Hall of Famer
- Bob Harrison – NBA player
- Dennis Hopson – NBA player
- Melvin Newbern – NBA player
- Natasha Howard – WNBA player
- Jim Jackson – NBA player; olympic bronze medalist (1991 Pan American Games); analyst for Big Ten Network & Fox Sports 1
- Bill Jones – one of the first African-American players in NBL history
- Howard "Butch" Komives – NBA player
- Todd Mitchell – NBA player
- Steve Mix – NBA player
- Tony Peyton – last of the original Harlem Globetrotters; one of the first African-American players in NBL history
- Walt Piatkowski – ABA player
- Kelvin Ransey – NBA player
- Brian Roberts – NBA & international basketball player
- Paul Seymour – NBA player; All-Star Game head coach (1961)
- Jae'Sean Tate – NBA player

=== Football ===
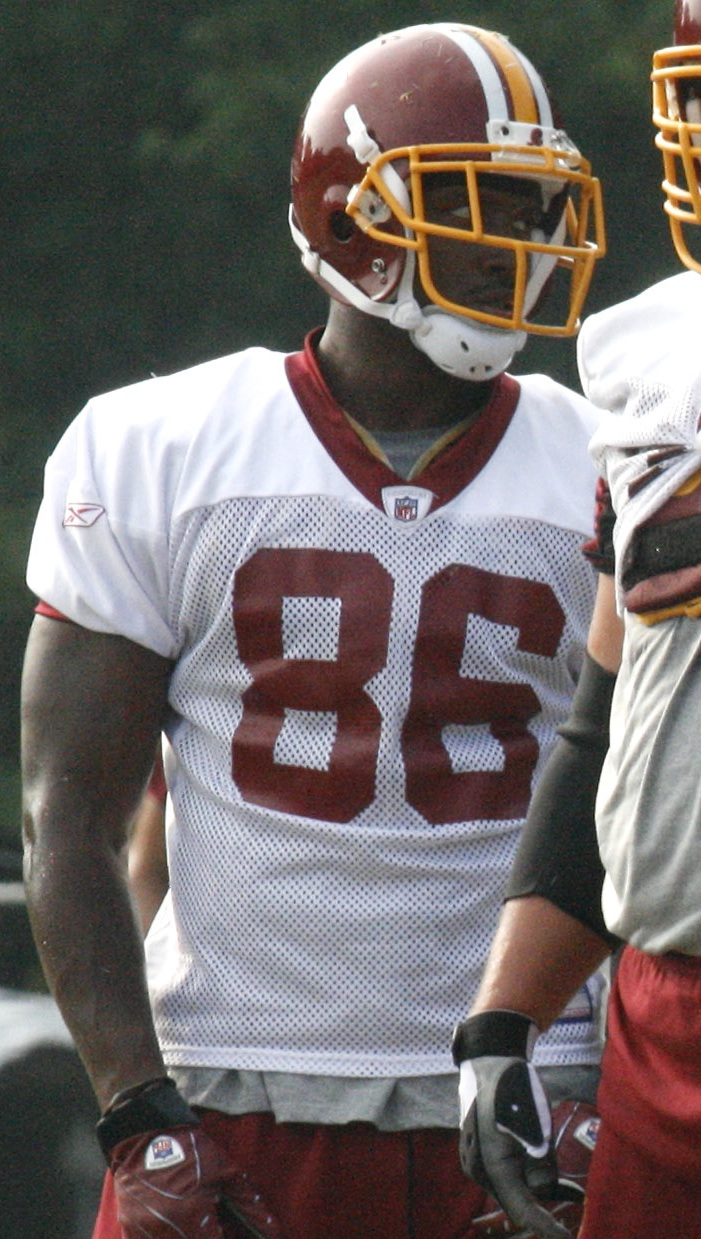
Fred Davis played tight end for the Washington Redskins.

- Tom Amstutz – head coach for University of Toledo Rockets
- JoJuan Armour – NFL player (safety); CFL (linebacker)
- Travis Baltz – NFL player (punter for Indianapolis Colts, New York Jets)
- Myron Bell – NFL player (safety for Pittsburgh Steelers, Cincinnati Bengals)
- Gerald (Jerry) Blanton – NFL player (linebacker for Kansas City Chiefs)
- Sam Brandon – NFL player (safety for Denver Broncos)
- Bob Briggs – AFL and NFL player (lineman for San Diego Chargers, Cleveland Browns, Kansas City Chiefs)
- Khary Campbell – NFL player (linebacker for New York Jets, Washington Redskins); Bowling Green player
- Jalil Carter – NFL player (cornerback for St. Louis Rams, Minnesota Vikings); CFL player (cornerback for Toronto Argonauts)
- Bob Chappuis – AAFC quarterback; University of Michigan player; College Football Hall of Famer
- Rob Chudzinski – NFL player and coach, former Cleveland Browns head coach
- Don Coleman – NFL player for New Orleans Saints, New York Jets
- Marvin Crenshaw – NFL player (offensive tackle for Pittsburgh Steelers
- Frank Culver – NFL player for Buffalo All-Americans, Rochester Jeffersons, Canton Bulldogs
- Fred Davis – NFL player (tight end for New England Patriots, Washington Redskins); USC player
- Ray DiPierro – NFL player (guard for Green Bay Packers, New Orleans Saints)
- Matt Eberflus – former head coach of the Chicago Bears
- Brandon Fields – NFL player (punter for Miami Dolphins)
- Forrest England – head coach of Arkansas State Red Wolves and University of Toledo football
- Todd France – NFL player (kicker for Philadelphia Eagles, Tampa Bay Buccaneers); University of Toledo player
- Jon Giesler – NFL player (offensive tackle for Miami Dolphins)
- Al Hadden – NFL player for Providence Steam Roller, Chicago Bears
- Jack Harbaugh – college football coach
- Jim Harbaugh – NFL quarterback, 1st round draft pick of the Chicago Bears in 1987, head coach Los Angeles Chargers, University of Michigan, Stanford, San Francisco 49ers
- John Harbaugh – head coach of Baltimore Ravens
- Willie Harper – NFL player (defensive end for San Francisco 49ers); two Super Bowls; first-team All-American for Nebraska
- Stan Heath – NFL player (quarterback for Green Bay Packers); CFL player for Calgary Stampeders
- Marty Huff – NFL player (linebacker for San Francisco 49ers); CFL player for Edmonton Eskimos; WFL player for Charlotte Hornets
- Kareem Hunt – NFL player (running back for Kansas City Chiefs); University of Toledo player
- Curtis Johnson – NFL player (defensive back for Miami Dolphins)
- Dick Kazmaier – Princeton football player, 1951 Heisman Trophy winner
- DeShone Kizer – NFL player (quarterback for Green Bay Packers, Cleveland Browns); Notre Dame player
- Jerry Krall – NFL player (halfback/defensive back for Detroit Lions)
- Roy Kurrasch – NFL player (end for Pittsburgh Steelers)
- Jeremy Lincoln – NFL player (defensive back for New York Giants, Chicago Bears)
- Mel Long – NFL player (defensive lineman for Cleveland Browns); first-team All-American for Toledo; College Football Hall of Famer
- Ron McDole – NFL player (defensive end for Buffalo Bills, Washington Redskins)
- Jack Mewhort – NFL player (offensive guard for Indianapolis Colts)
- Urban Meyer – head coach of Jacksonville Jaguars, Ohio State, Bowling Green, Utah, Florida
- Bob Momsen – NFL player (guard, linebacker for Detroit Lions, San Francisco 49ers)
- Tony Momsen – NFL player (center, linebacker for Pittsburgh Steelers, Washington Redskins); CFL player for Calgary Stampeders
- Jim Nicholson – University of Toledo football coach, businessman
- Roosevelt Nix – NFL player (defensive end for Cincinnati Bengals, Minnesota Vikings)
- Storm Norton – NFL player (offensive tackle for Detroit Lions, Arizona Cardinals, Minnesota Vikings)
- Bill Orwig – head coach for University of Toledo Rockets
- Eric Page – NFL player (wide receiver/punt returner for Denver Broncos, Tampa Bay Buccaneers; University of Toledo player
- Gerry Palmer – CFL player for Winnipeg Blue Bombers, BC Lions; University of Toledo player
- Jim Parker – NFL player (offensive tackle for Baltimore Colts); College Football and Pro Football Hall of Famer
- Shea Patterson – college football player (quarterback for University of Michigan)
- Frank Pauly – NFL player (tackle for Chicago Bears)
- Boni Petcoff – NFL player (tackle for Columbus Tigers); head coach for University of Toledo Rockets
- Damond Powell – NFL football (wide receiver for Arizona Cardinals)
- Bryan Robinson – NFL player (defensive tackle for Arizona Cardinals, Cincinnati Bengals, Miami Dolphins, Chicago Bears, St. Louis Rams)
- Ryne Robinson – NFL player for Carolina Panthers, former Miami University player
- James O. Rodgers – head coach for Yale
- Jim Root – NFL player (quarterback for Chicago Cardinals); head coach for New Hampshire, William & Mary
- Dane Sanzenbacher – NFL player (wide receiver for Cincinnati Bengals), Ohio State player
- Eddie Scharer – NFL player for Detroit Panthers, Pottsville Maroons, Detroit Wolverines
- Warren Schmakel – head coach for Central Michigan, Boston University
- Bob Snyder – NFL player for Chicago Bears; three-time NFL champion; head coach for Los Angeles Rams, Toledo Rockets
- Bob Spitulski – NFL player (linebacker for Seattle Seahawks, St. Louis Rams)
- Clint Stickdorn – NFL player (offensive tackle for Detroit Lions); University of Cincinnati player
- Dick Strahm – College Football Hall of Famer; head coach for University of Findlay
- Fred Sturt – NFL player for Washington Redskins, New England Patriots, New Orleans Saints; Bowling Green player
- Dick Szymanski – NFL player (center/guard for Baltimore Colts; 3-time NFL champion & Pro-Bowl player
- Chester Taylor – NFL player (running back for Minnesota Vikings); University of Toledo player
- Joe Tiller – head coach for Purdue, Wyoming
- Rick Upchurch – NFL player (wide receiver for Denver Broncos), 5-time All-Pro selection
- Doc Urich – head coach for Buffalo, Northern Illinois
- Eddie Usher – NFL player for Green Bay Packers
- Dick Vick – NFL player for Kenosha Maroons, Detroit Panthers, Canton Bulldogs
- Rick Volk – NFL player (safety for Baltimore Colts, New York Giants, Miami Dolphins; Super Bowl champion
- Nate Washington – NFL player (wide receiver for Pittsburgh Steelers, Tennessee Titans); 2-time Super Bowl champion
- Chuck Webb – NFL player (running back for Green Bay Packers)
- Ivy Williamson – head coach for Wisconsin
- Heath Wingate – NFL player (center for Washington Redskins; Bowling Green player
- Chris Wormley – NFL player (defensive end for Baltimore Ravens, Pittsburgh Steelers)
- Ernie Wright – NFL player (tackle for Los Angeles/San Diego Chargers, Cincinnati Bengals)

=== Ice hockey ===
- Cecil Dillon – NHL player
- Rick Hayward – NHL player
- Gordie Howe – NHL player
- Pat Jablonski – NHL goaltender
- Mitchell Miller – KHL player
- Bryan Smolinski – NHL player

=== Golf ===
- John Cook – PGA Tour golfer
- Arthur Hills – golf course designer
- Stacy Lewis – LPGA Tour golfer, winner of 2013 Women's British Open
- Pat Lindsey – PGA Tour golfer; winner of 1983 B.C. Open
- Frank Stranahan – PGA Tour golfer; British Open and Masters runner-up; weightlifter
- A. W. Tillinghast – golf course designer

=== Combat sports ===
- Jared Anderson – professional boxer, heavyweight contender
- Robert Easter Jr. – professional boxer, IBF lightweight world champion
- Sonny Fredrickson – professional boxer
- Sawyer Fulton – professional wrestler, former WWE wrestler, current IMPACT Wrestling Superstar
- Mark Kerr – Syracuse University Division I champion, US senior champion, professional mixed martial arts fighter
- Dante Leon – Brazilian jiu-jitsu black belt, world champion, instructor
- Wilbert McClure – gold medalist in boxing in 1960 Summer Olympics
- Trey Miguel – IMPACT Wrestling Superstar, current X Division Champion
- Devin Vargas – professional boxer, former Olympian
- Greg Wojciechowski – 1980 Olympic wrestler, unable to compete due to U.S. boycott; alternate in 1984 and 1988

=== Other sports ===
- Joey Akpunonu – soccer player
- Gretchen Bleiler – silver medalist at 2006 Turin Olympics in snowboarding; three-time X Games champion (2003, 2005, 2008)
- Paul Chamberlin – tennis player
- Edmund Coffin – saddle maker, equestrian Olympic gold medalist
- Terry Cook – driver in the NASCAR Camping World Truck Series
- Iggy Katona – ARCA and NASCAR driver
- Erik Kynard – silver medalist in men's high jump at 2012 London Olympics
- Brenda Morehead – 100 meter sprinter, competed in 1976 Montreal Olympics; graduate of Toledo Scott
- Frances Schroth – swimmer, winner of one gold and two bronze medals in 1920 Olympic Games
- Angela Yeo – professional bodybuilder

== Other notables ==
- Alvina Costilla – social worker and activist
- David Jeremiah – Evangelical Christian author, senior pastor of Shadow Mountain Community Church
- Carl James Joseph – "Jesus Guy"
- Henry Noble MacCracken – longtime president of Vassar College, a founder of Sarah Lawrence College
- Ernest M. McSorley – captain of the ill-fated lake freighter SS Edmund Fitzgerald
- Selma Rubin – environmental activist based in Santa Barbara, California
- Rosa L. Segur – suffragist
- Samuel "Joe the Plumber" Wurzelbacher - political activist and commentator

== See also ==
- List of mayors of Toledo, Ohio
- List of people from Ohio
