= Michael Stewart Witherell =

American physicist (born 1949)

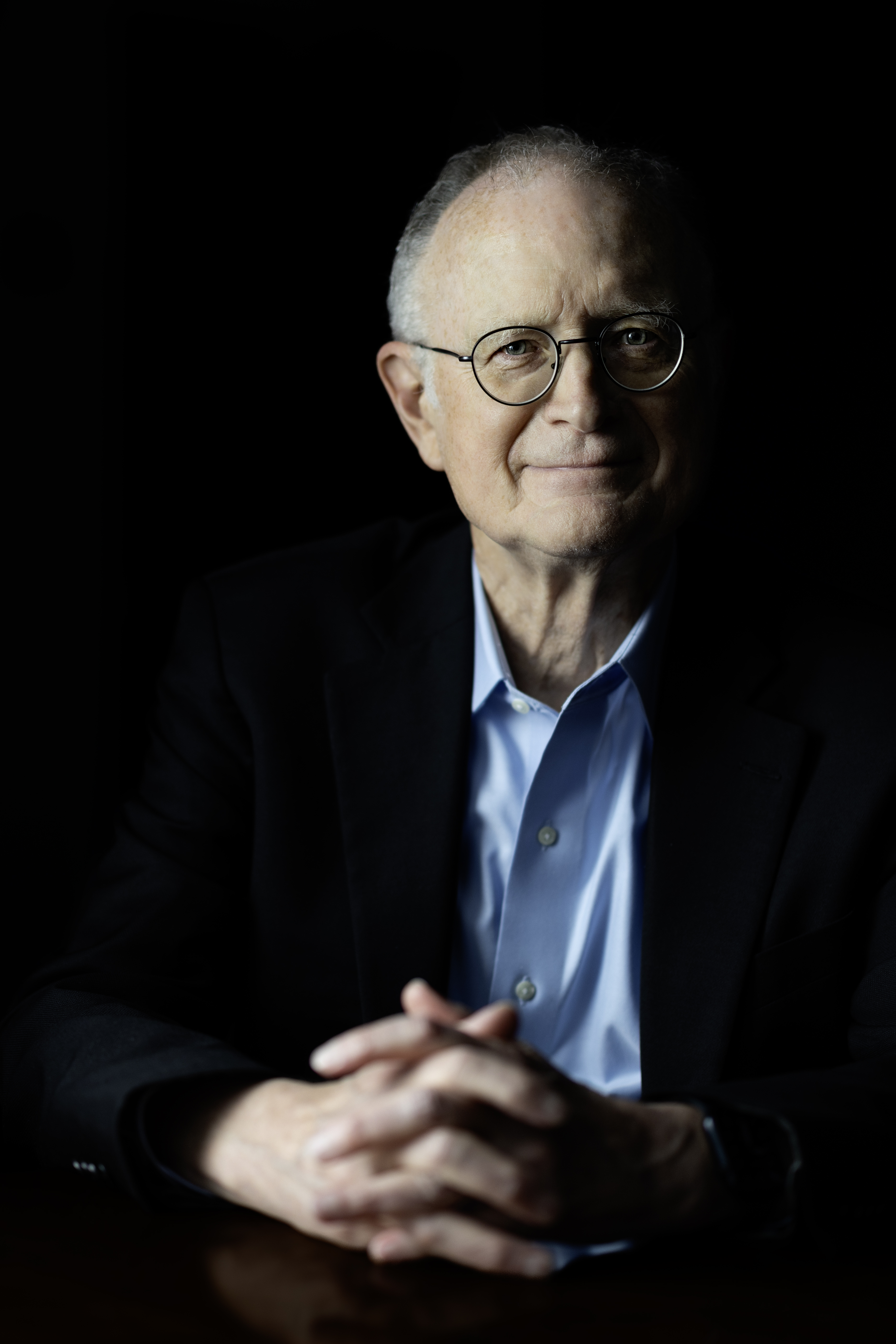
- Witherell in 2025

8th Director of the Lawrence Berkeley National Laboratory
- In office March 1, 2016 – June 30, 2026
- President: Barack Obama; Donald Trump; Joe Biden; Donald Trump
- Preceded by: Paul Alivisatos
- Succeeded by: Katherine Yelick

4th Director of the Fermilab
- In office July 1, 1999 – June 30, 2005
- President: Bill Clinton; George W. Bush
- Preceded by: John Peoples Jr.
- Succeeded by: Piermaria Oddone

Personal details
- Born: 22 September 1949 (age 76) Toledo, Ohio, U.S.
- Education: University of Michigan (BS); University of Wisconsin (PhD)
- Scientific career
- Fields: Physics (high-energy particle physics)
- Workplaces: Lawrence Berkeley National Laboratory, University of California, Santa Barbara, Fermilab, Princeton University
- Thesis: The eta-pion mass-spectrum from threshold to 1200 mev/c-square in the reaction negative pion-proton ---> (negative pion,eta-meson,proton) (1973)
- Doctoral advisor: Richard Prepost

Michael Stewart Witherell (born 22 September 1949) is an American particle physicist and laboratory director emeritus of Lawrence Berkeley National Laboratory, which he led from March, 2016 to June, 2026. Witherell previously served as Director of Fermilab, and was a professor and vice chancellor for research at the University of California, Santa Barbara.

== Early life and education ==
He was born 22 September 1949 in Toledo, Ohio. Witherell received a Bachelor of Science from the University of Michigan in 1968 and a Ph.D. from the University of Wisconsin, Madison in 1973.

== Career ==
From 1973 to 1981 he was on the faculty of Princeton University. He was a member of the physics faculty at the University of California, Santa Barbara from 1981 to 1999.

In 1985 Witherell led an experiment at Fermilab which was the first to isolate a large sample of particles containing the charm quark using the new technology of silicon microstrip detectors. He received the 1990 Panofsky Prize from the American Physical Society for this research. In 1998 he was elected to the National Academy of Sciences.

Witherell served as the Director of the Fermilab from 1999 to 2005. In 2005 he returned to UC Santa Barbara as the Vice Chancellor for Research, serving in that role until 2016.

In January 2016, the University of California Board of Regents appointed him to be the Director of Lawrence Berkeley National Laboratory. In 2017 he was elected to the American Academy of Arts and Sciences.

== Service to the national science enterprise ==
Witherell is the chair of the National Academies' Committee on Science, Engineering, Medicine and Public Policy (COSEMPUP), starting in September, 2026. He previously served on COSEMPUP from 2017-2021. He also served a three-year term on the National Academy of Sciences Council from 2023-2026.

Witherell chaired the Fermilab Program Advisory Committee from 1987 to 1989 and the SLAC Scientific Policy Committee from 1994 to 1996, and the High Energy Physics Advisory Panel of the United States Department of Energy from 1997 to 1999. He chaired the Mathematical and Physical Sciences Advisory Committee (MPSAC) of the NSF from 2006 to 2008 and the National Academy of Science's Board on Physics and Astronomy from 2015 to 2016.

== Personal life ==
His wife Elizabeth Witherell, a literary historian and scholarly editor, is editor-in-chief of The Writings of Henry D. Thoreau project at UC Santa Barbara.

== Awards and honors ==
- 1986: elected a Fellow of the American Physical Society
- 1988: Guggenheim Fellow for the academic year 1988–1989
- 1990: awarded the Panofsky Prize
- 1998: elected a member of the National Academy of Sciences
- 2004: received the Gold Award of the US Secretary of Energy
- 2017: elected a member of the American Academy of Arts and Sciences
