= Effler =

Effler is a surname. Notable people with the surname include:

- Anamaria Effler, Romanian-American physicist
- Johann Friedrich Heinrich Effler (1772–1837), German clergyman and teacher
- Louis Effler (1888–1978), American physician and writer

== See also ==
- Effler, West Virginia
