= Rufus Mayes =

American football player (1947–1990)

No. 71, 77
- Positions: Tackle, Guard

Personal information
- Born: December 5, 1947; Memphis, Tennessee, U.S.
- Died: January 9, 1990 (aged 42); Bellevue, Washington, U.S.
- Listed height: 6 ft 5 in (1.96 m)
- Listed weight: 260 lb (118 kg)

Career information
- High school: Macomber-Whitney (Toledo, Ohio)
- College: Ohio State (1965-1968)
- NFL draft: 1969: 1st round, 14th overall pick

Career history
- Chicago Bears (1969); Cincinnati Bengals (1970–1978); Philadelphia Eagles (1979)

Awards and highlights
- National champion (1968); Second-team All-American (1968); First-team All-Big Ten (1968)

Career NFL statistics
- Games Played: 139
- Games Started: 111
- Stats at Pro Football Reference

Rufus Lee Mayes (December 5, 1947 – January 9, 1990) was an American professional football offensive lineman in the National Football League (NFL) for the Chicago Bears, the Cincinnati Bengals, and the Philadelphia Eagles.

== Early life ==
Mayes grew up in Toledo, Ohio, the son of Mr. and Mrs. Roosevelt Mayes, who also had three daughters. He attended Toledo Macomber High School in Toledo, where he led the team to the 1964 City League championship.

== College career ==
Mayes attended Ohio State University and was a starting lineman for all 28 games he played for the Ohio State Buckeyes. His first two years, he was a tight end. After the Buckeyes had records of 4-5 and 6-3, respectively, in his first two-season, in his senior year he was switched to offensive tackle. The Buckeyes went 10-0, won the Big Ten championship, defeated the University of Southern California in the 1969 Rose Bowl and were named national champions.

Following his senior season, Mayes was named Second-Team All-American by the Associated Press.

== Professional career ==
Mayes was selected in the first round (14th overall) of the 1969 NFL/AFL draft by the Chicago Bears, for whom he played one season and 13 games.

In January 1970, he was traded by the Bears to the Cincinnati Bengals in return for defensive lineman Bill Staley and Harry Gunner. In 2004, the Chicago Tribune rated the trade of Mayes by the Bears to the Bengals the sixth-worst in Bears history.

Mayes' first season with the Bengals, 1970, was the Bengals' first in the NFL following the NFL/AFL merger. He proceeded to become a perennial starter at offensive left tackle for eight seasons with the Bengals. During his eight-year Bengals career, Mayes started 98 of the 110 games he played.

He played out his option and became a free agent. In June 1978, he signed with the Philadelphia Eagles, for whom he played his final NFL season. As a backup, he played in all 16 games.

== Personal life ==
After football, Mayes was a marketing representative for Hewlett-Packard in Bellevue, Washington, and resided in Redmond, Washington, with his wife, Aishah, and son, Taysir.

In 1994, he was inducted into the Ohio State Men's Varsity "O" Hall of Fame

Rufus Mayes died on January 9, 1990, at age 42 of bacterial meningitis. His coach at Macomber High School, Steve Contos, called Mayes "a great guy, a very bright, very concerned, happy, easy to get along with type of guy."
