= Garde Arts Center =

Non-profit performing arts center and cinema in New London, Connecticut

Coordinates: 41°21′19″N 72°05′57″W

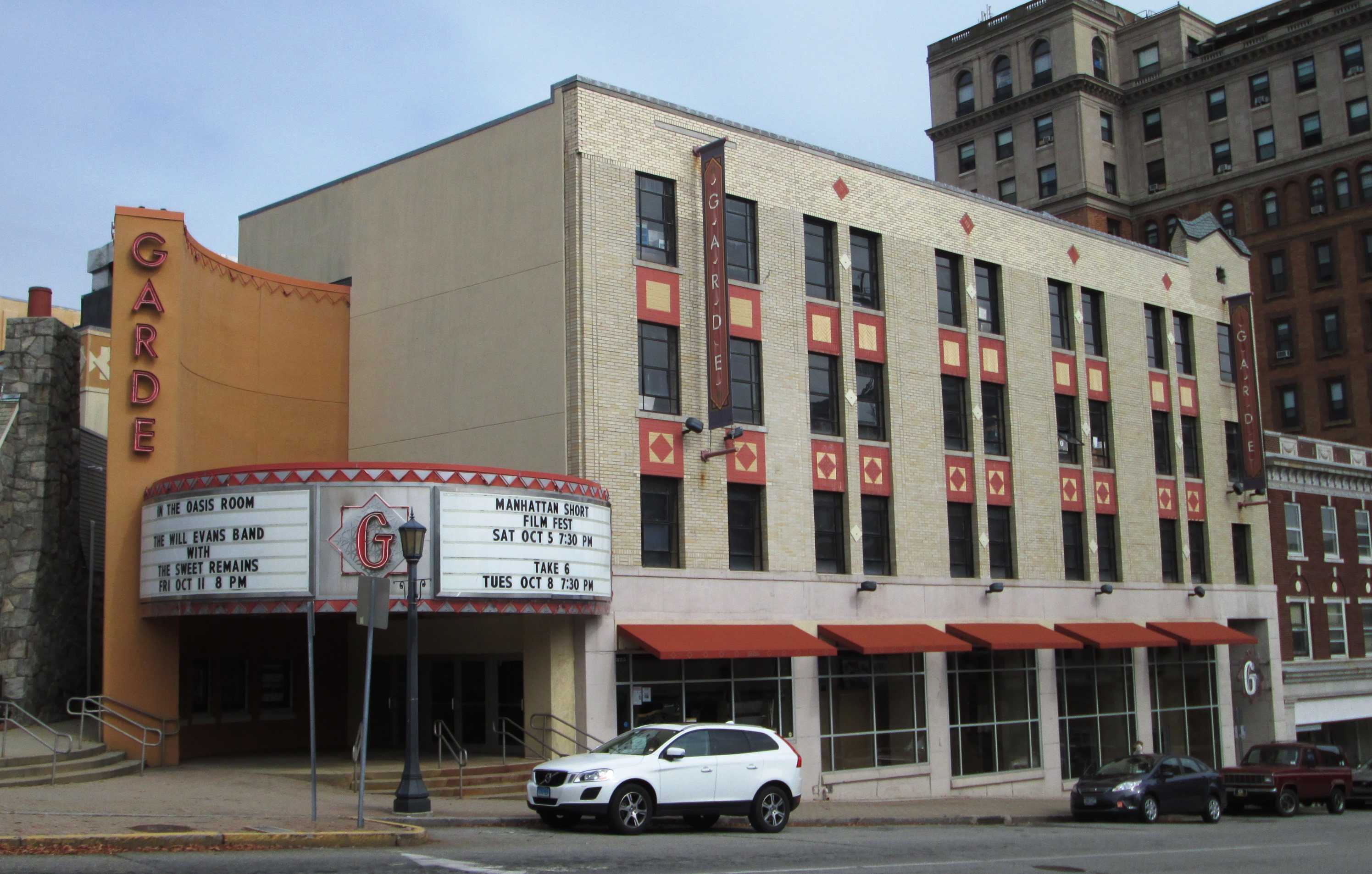
Garde Arts Center from the southwest

The Garde Arts Center is a non-profit performing arts center and cinema located at 325 State Street at the corner of Huntington Street in New London, Connecticut. It owns and operates the Garde Theatre, a historic movie palace and current concert venue with approximately 1,425 seats.

== History ==
The theater was built in 1926, designed by architect Arland W. Johnson as a vaudeville house and movie theater. It has a Moroccan-style interior featuring middle-eastern themed wall murals by Vera Leeper. The Garde Arts Center includes the Garde Office Building, the Oasis Room, a 120-seat music performance space, the Mercer Building where the Center's offices are located, and the Meridian Building, a service facility. All three buildings are located on the site of the mansion of whaling merchant William Williams.

The theater was built under the direction of Arthur S. Friend, a New York movie studio attorney who was a partner in Famous Players–Lasky, a movie distribution company that became Paramount Pictures Corporation. The Garde was named after Walter Garde, a Hartford and New London businessman; it opened on September 22, 1926 with the silent film The Marriage Clause starring matinee idols Francis X. Bushman (1883-1966) and Billie Dove (1903-1997). It was hailed by the press as one of the finest theaters in New England. It was a stage for Vaudeville as well as film, as was typical in that time, and variety acts of music, comedy, acrobatics, and magic were interspersed between feature films, comedy shorts, and newsreels.

In September 1929, the theater and the four-story Garde office building were purchased by Warner Bros. for $1 million, one of 18 theaters in New England that the studio purchased to introduce their new "talking pictures" technology. The Garde was closed in 1977 under the ownership of RKO-Stanley-Warner and sold to a local business family. It was in danger of being demolished until 1985 when the Garde Arts Center was founded to save and reuse the theatre.
