= Macomber High School (Toledo, Ohio) =

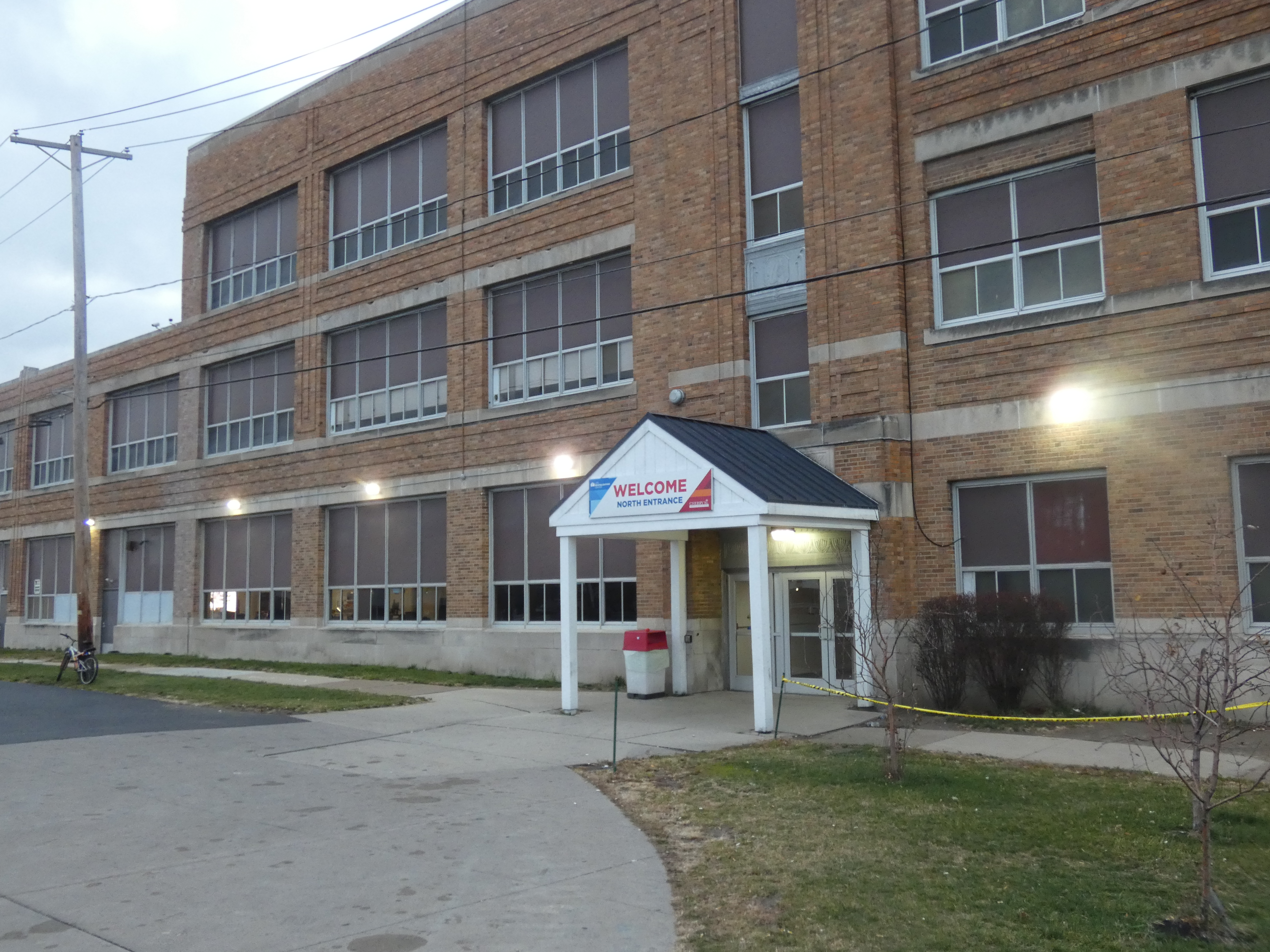
- Front entrance of Macomber High School. Now operated by Cherry Street Mission.

Location
- 1501 Monroe Street; Toledo, Ohio 43604; United States; 41°39′12″N 83°32′52″W

Information
- Type: Vocational School
- Opened: 1938
- Closed: 1991
- School district: Toledo City School District
- Grades: 9-12
- Colors: Black & Gold
- Athletics conference: Toledo City League
- Nickname: Macmen/Craftsmen
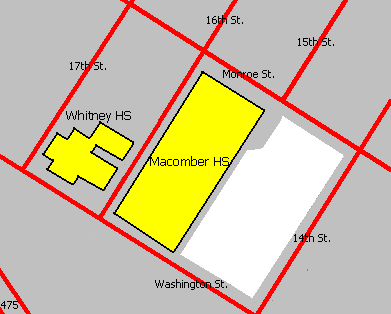
- Map drawing of the building, including Whitney High School.

Irving E. Macomber Vocational Technical High School was a vocational public high school in Toledo, Ohio, United States, from 1938 to June 1991. It was named for the man who helped develop the city's schools and parks, and who used to live on the property the school was built on. Macomber served the entire city and was part of the Toledo Public School District. The school began as Vocational High School in the original Toledo high school in 1927 before moving to its location on Monroe Street in 1938. In 1959, the school became joint-operational with Whitney High School, an all-girls vocational school located just across 16th St., and the two buildings came to be known as Macomber-Whitney. The building still sits on Monroe Street, just northwest of Fifth Third Field.

== History ==
The Macomber Macmen/Craftsmen were members of the Toledo City League and donned the colors of black and gold. Their main rivals were the Scott Bulldogs, which was especially heated in their basketball match-ups. Macomber's lone team state title came in 1989, when their boys' basketball team won the Division I state championship.

A "unique" situation for Macomber was that they were only able to have true home games for basketball and volleyball. Lacking a football stadium, ball diamonds, and a track, the Macmen made use of neighboring schools for "home" events, notably at Bowsher, Central Catholic, DeVilbiss, and Waite. During the 1980s when the boys basketball team had its greatest success, their home games were moved to other fieldhouses in order to accommodate the large crowds that turned out for their games.

Due to a declining enrollment and low finances, Macomber and Whitney were closed along with DeVilbiss High School by TPS at the end of the 1990–1991 school year. The school was spared after an attempt to shutter its doors in 1989 and had its freshman class eliminated during its last year in operation.

Macomber remained empty until 1998 when TPS sold the building for $425,000 to an industrial roofing company. After changing ownership a few times and finding a few other purposes for use, the building was purchased by the Cherry Street Mission in 2013 to help them have a centralized location for their ministry efforts to the homeless.

In early 2014, TPS superintendent Romules Durant proposed re-opening Macomber-Whitney (likely at another location due to Cherry Street Mission's purchase of the building) so that Toledo could have a centralized vocational high school again.

== Ohio High School Athletic Association State Championships ==
- Basketball, Division I: 1989

== Notable alumni ==
- Myron Bell (1989): NFL football player for the Pittsburgh Steelers and Cincinnati Bengals
- Jim Jackson (1989): former NBA basketball player and Ohio State Buckeye, currently a basketball analyst for Fox Sports and TNT Sports, formerly at the Big Ten Network
- Wardell Jackson (1970): retired basketball player for the Ohio State University and the Seattle SuperSonics
- Leo Kubiak (1944): former NBA player
- Mel Long (1964): football player for the University of Toledo during their 35-game undefeated streak
- Rufus Mayes (1965): NFL football player that was a member of the 1968 Ohio State national champions team
- Kelvin Ransey (1976): former basketball star with the Portland Trail Blazers and Ohio State Buckeyes
- Chuck Webb (1988): a former football player with the Green Bay Packers and Tennessee Volunteers
