= Proctor's Theater (Troy, New York) =

- U.S. National Register of Historic Places
- U.S. Historic district – Contributing property
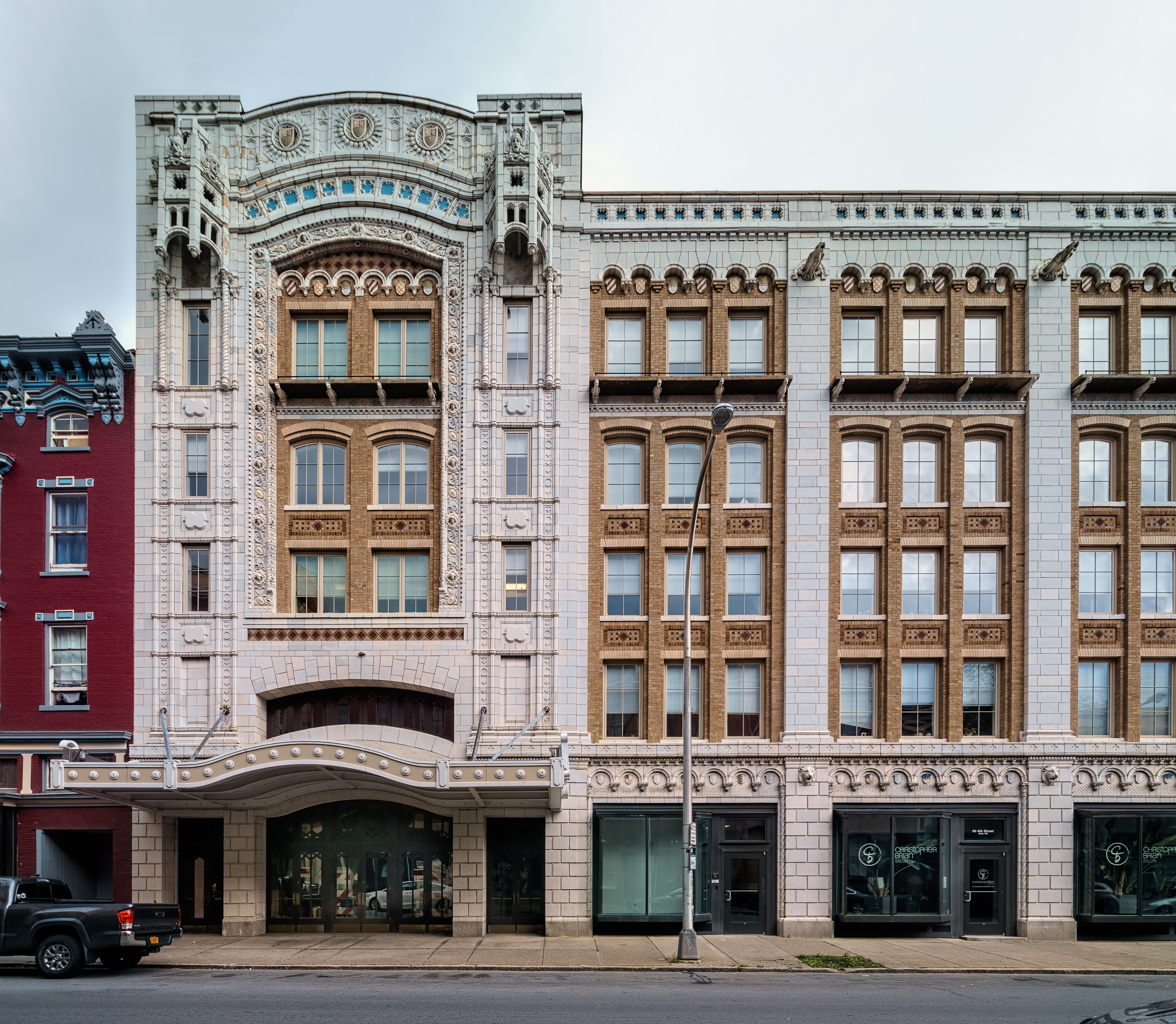
- Front (west) elevation, 2021

- Location within New York Location within the United States
- Location: Troy, NY
- Coordinates: 42°43′50″N 73°41′20″W
- Built: 1914
- Architect: Arland W. Johnson
- Part of: Central Troy Historic District (ID86001527)
- MPS: Movie Palaces of the Tri-Cities TR
- NRHP reference No.: 79001623
- Added to NRHP: 1979

Proctor's Theater is located on Fourth Street (northbound US 4) in Troy, New York, United States. It was listed on the National Register of Historic Places in 1979, and is a contributing property to the Central Troy Historic District, added to the Register in 1986.

It was built in 1914 for vaudeville performances by Capital District entrepreneur Frederick Freeman Proctor, who also built another theater with his name in nearby Schenectady. Its double-balcony auditorium made it easily adaptable for showing motion pictures when that entertainment came into fashion soon after it opened. The building is credited to architect Arland W. Johnson.

In the late 1970s it closed. Since then it has been through several owners, including Rensselaer Polytechnic Institute (RPI), which have had various plans, including renovating it into office space or reusing it as a theater. In 2014, it was announced that Columbia Development would be renovating the building for the Rensselaer County Chamber of Commerce.

As of September 2018, the building has been repurposed into a modern office space behind the preserved façade. Current tenants include the Rensselaer County Chamber of Commerce, Rensselaer Polytechnic Institute and Christopher Brian Salon.

== Building ==
The theater is part of a row of buildings along the east side of Fourth Street. It is five stories high, with a highly decorative facade of brick and marble covered in glazed terra-cotta. On the ground level, rusticated columns rise up to lion's heads. Five engaged marble columns frame the upper floors, rising to gargoyle-like figures, and two towers rise above the roofline at either end of the facade. The one above the main entry features a variety of terra cotta details: colonettes, dentils, escutcheons, and paretae.

The interior has suffered from years of neglect, but its basic plan remains. The tiled lobby with arched ceilings and paneled walls leads via staircases to the two balconies, and into a foyer to the orchestra floor. Gold leaf adorned (or originally did) the arches in that section. The proscenium features a David Lithgow painting of Lafayette's visit to Troy in 1824. All these fixtures remain unchanged from the theater's original construction.

== History ==
Proctor, who had already built and operated several successful vaudeville theaters in Albany and New York City hired Arland Johnson to design the theater, hoping to make it his grandest project since entering the business nearly three decades before. It cost $325,000 to construct, and when it opened in 1914 it became the largest theater in the state and was praised as "a structure ranking foremost in American theatrical circles."

From their inception, he had realized the potential of motion pictures and had begun adapting his theaters to the new medium. The Troy Proctor's classically inspired double-balcony form lent itself well to the movies because it put the audience close to the stage no matter where they were in the theater. It had not been designed to accommodate a projector and screen, but by the 1920s a booth had been added. During that era, its productions, like many other theaters of the time, included both live and filmed entertainment. In the 1930s, with the advent of the sound era making the live act superfluous, the central chandelier was removed along with some other renovations, including removing the paintings from the lobby and painting over the gold leaf in the orchestra.

After Proctor's death in 1929, the theater continued to operate as a popular downtown destination. After the mid-20th century, it began to lose business due to television and suburbanization. In 1977, it finally closed, its last show seen by a crowd of around 170 people. The final show was The Longest Yard starring Burt Reynolds. A year later the city acquired the property when it foreclosed on the then-owners. It is the only remaining movie palace in Troy, albeit unused for that purpose ever since then.

=== Relationship with Rensselaer Polytechnic Institute ===
RPI students frequented Proctor's Theater for movie screenings, live performances, and vaudeville acts during its run as a performance hall. Ads featuring performances at Proctor's Theater were featured in the RPI Student Newspaper, The Polytechnic, until Proctor's Theater closed in 1977.

In the early 1900s, RPI students performed vaudeville and musical acts at Proctor's Theater. The “RPI Nights” act originated in 1915 under the direction of C. F. Matthews, referred to as "Matty" by his peers at RPI. Matthews graduated from RPI in 1916, and the weekly RPI Nights performances also ended.

In March 1922, a group of RPI students re-established the RPI Nights as a weekly act at Proctor's Theater. After a successful opening night, as described in The Polytechnic, the “Campus Five” was established. The group featured five RPI students and was led by Mark Albert “Pete” Gerwig. Their repertoire included musical performances on the banjo, saxophone, violin, and included clog dancing, folk singing, jazz, and more. While the Campus Five had its origins at Proctor's Theater, the group performed at a range of RPI-hosted events, including dances, events, and dinners for various organizations on and off campus.

The RPI Nights performances were very well attended by the public. At one point, The Polytechnic stated "Tute nights are a great success. The size of the audience that attended the first performance was the largest ever assembled in the history of Proctor’s; according to the Manager Emde." After “Pete” Gerwig and the RPI Five graduated from RPI, it is unclear whether Rensselaer students continued to perform at Proctor's Theater as the Campus Five.

In later years, RPI hosted events and acts at Proctor's Theater. In the 1970s, the Rensselaer Concert Board hosted several musical and entertainment acts for the RPI community. In October 1975, the Rensselaer Concert Board presented in concert folk-rock groups Poco and McKendree Spring at Proctors. This event was organized by RPI's Union Programs and Activities Committee (UPAC). UPAC also hosted the comedy radio show National Lampoon Radio Hour in 1975 at Proctor's Theater.

RPI purchased Proctor's Theater in 2004.

=== Redevelopment proposal ===
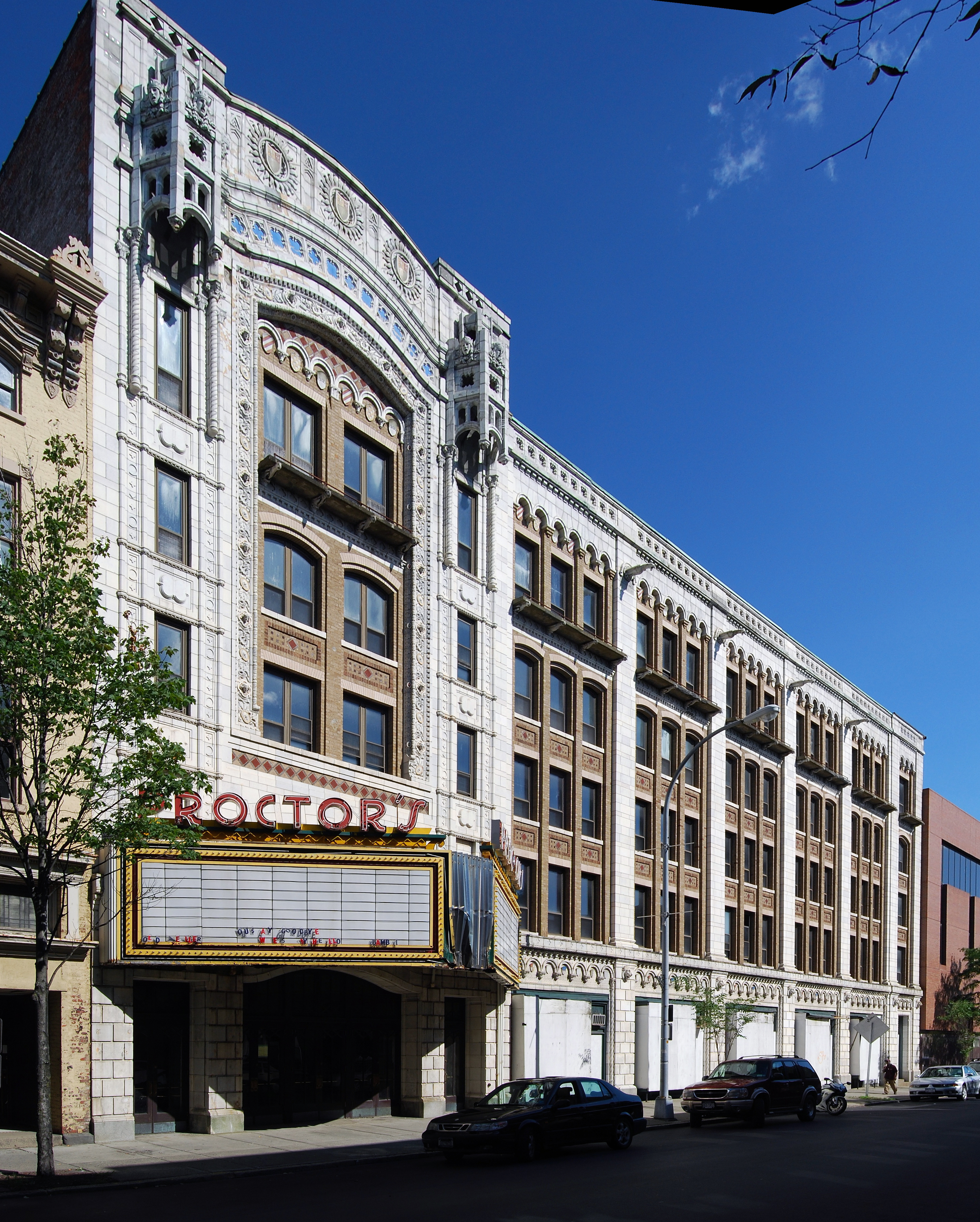
The facade in 2008. Note the theater marquee.

In the early 2000s, RPI acquired the building and hoped to partially use it as office space and keep the theater. They eventually brought in a developer who proposed to use a state grant to gut the building's interior and replace the auditorium with office space, while keeping the facade. Residents organized a group and online petition in opposition to this, pointing to how successful the restoration of the Schenectady Proctor's had been for that city. The building was structurally sound, and could easily be restored to its original purpose.

Proponents of the plan responded that the theater had not been successfully redeveloped in the years since it had closed and it was time to try something else to revitalize a block of downtown Troy that remained dilapidated. They noted that the Schenectady Proctor's still lost money and that the project would create jobs the city needed in a slow economy.

=== Restore NY grant ===
As of March, 2011, the theatre is expected to receive $3.3 million from a "Restore NY" grant. The money would be used by Columbia Development to rehabilitate the theatre building and two adjacent office buildings, including the Chasan Building, which is also owned by RPI.

In October 2011 it was announced that, in a $14.4 million public-private project including a $3.3 million Restore New York grant, Columbia Development Companies would acquire Proctor's Theater and launch a restoration.

== See also ==
- National Register of Historic Places listings in Rensselaer County, New York
