= Proctor's Theatre (Schenectady, New York) =

Historic theatre in Schenectady, New York

Proctors
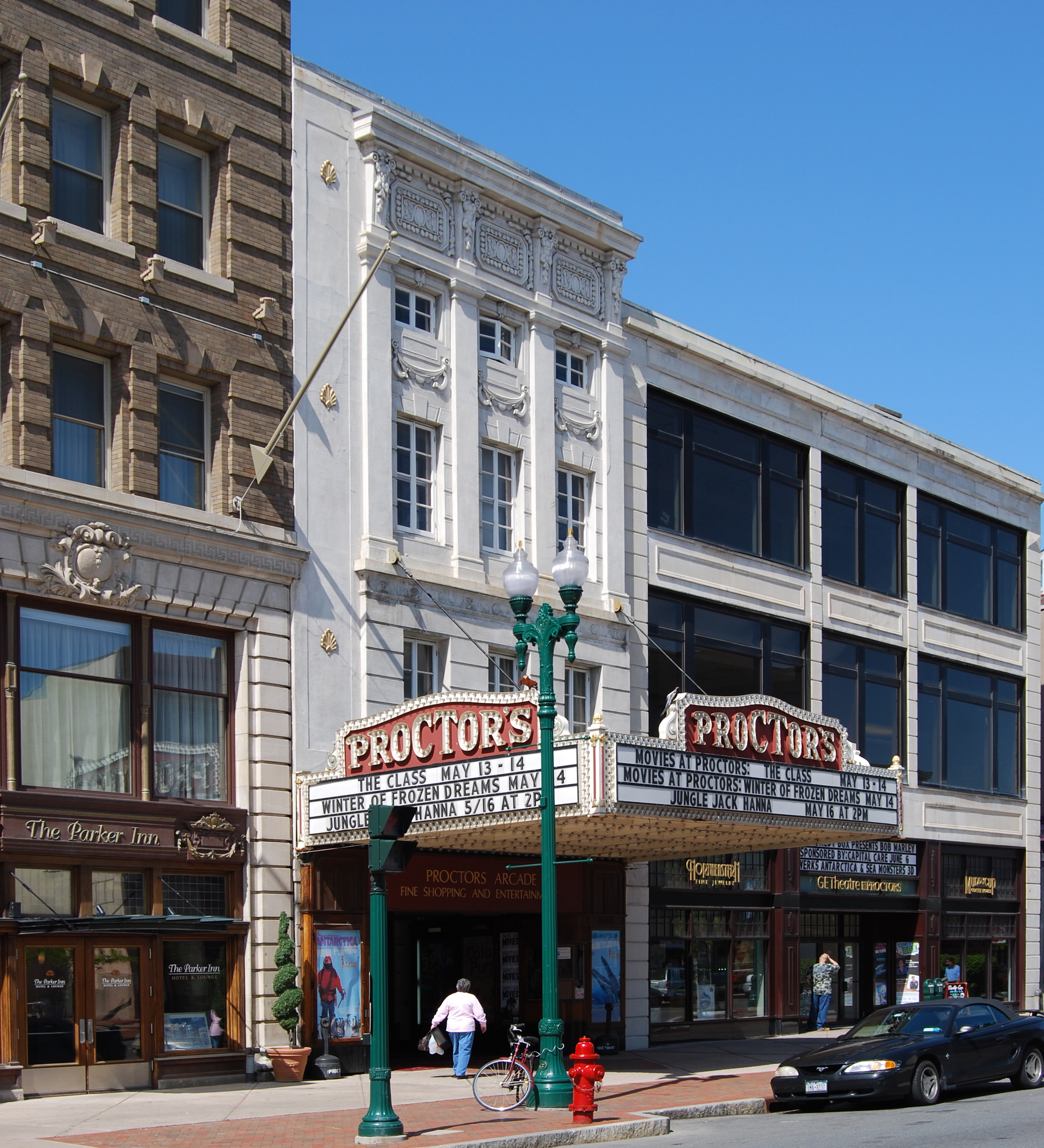
- North elevation and marquee, 2009
- Interactive map of Proctors
- Address: 432 State Street; Schenectady, New York; United States
- Owner: Arts Center and Theatre of Schenectady
- Capacity: 3,250
- Type: Movie palace
- Designation: NRHP #79003237

Construction
- Opened: 1926
- Reopened: 1980
- Architect: Thomas W. Lamb

Website
- www.atproctors.org
- Proctor's Theatre
- U.S. National Register of Historic Places
- Location within New York Location within the United States
- Location: 432 State Street, Schenectady, New York
- Coordinates: 42°48′44″N 73°56′31″W
- Area: less than one acre
- Built: 1926
- Architect: Lamb, Thomas
- MPS: Movie Palaces of the Tri-Cities TR
- NRHP reference No.: 79003237
- Added to NRHP: October 4, 1979

Proctor's Theatre (officially stylized as Proctors since 2007; however, the marquee retains the apostrophe) is a theatre and former vaudeville house located in Schenectady, New York, United States. Many famous artists have performed there, including Mariah Carey (whose 1993 top-rated Thanksgiving special was taped there), Britney Spears, Hal Holbrook, Ted Wiles, and George Burns, as well as many others. It has one of the largest movie screens in the Northeast.

The theatre was opened on December 27, 1926. It was designed by architect Thomas Lamb. In 1979 the building was added to the National Register of Historic Places, shortly before being renovated after a long period of decline and neglect. A renovation completed in 2007 added two theatres to the complex, providing a variety of performance spaces.

== Building ==
The theater building is located on the south side of State Street (NY 5), in a densely developed commercial area. The exterior of the building and its interior arcade are included in the Register listing.

It is a three-story building with attic. The North (front) facade is faced in stucco, with engaged Doric pilasters. Ornamentation includes garlands and paterae on the friezes. A large marquee covers the sidewalk in front.

Inside, the arcade that connects the entrance to the theatre features space for (originally) 14 boutiques, with five copper-framed glass windows. A marble staircase leads to the upstairs offices, and the box office and showcase are paneled in Walnut.

The foyer is carpeted in red, with men's and women's smoking rooms on either side. Two more marble staircases lead to the balcony level. A pastoral mural in sepia decorates the wall. The staircases lead to a balcony promenade with an authentic Louis XV style sofa. Decoration includes Corinthian columns, iron railings and extensive gold leaf detailing.

Corinthian columns also flank the proscenium arch over the stage. Gold leaf detail is all over the domed ceiling and entrance arches, in contrast to the black and silver damask wall coverings. The side loges are trimmed with iron grilles in the arches and heavy velvet drapes. Light is provided by a central black and gold chandelier with 192 lamps, flanked by six smaller fixtures.

== History ==
The arrival of General Electric led to rapid growth in Schenectady through the late 19th and early 20th century. The city's streetcar network made its downtown more accessible to the city. The vaudeville impresario Frederick Freeman Proctor chose to build his first theater in 1912. In the last years of his life, he decided to replace it. It cost $1.5 million ($27.3 million in contemporary dollars) to build and opened on December 27, 1926, with a showing of the silent film Stranded in Paris. The audience was so impressed by the lavish facilities that no one complained about the malfunctioning Wurlitzer theatre organ, an "F 3M" style, model# Opus 1469.

Proctor had sound equipment installed two years later for the new sound films. Shortly before his death in 1929, Proctor sold his theater chain to RKO Pictures.

On May 22, 1930, the theatre hosted Ernst Alexanderson, who conducted an early public demonstration of television, utilizing his closed-circuit system and projecting a large screen image on a six by six foot screen.

The theatre had fallen into disrepair throughout the 1960s and '70s while population shifted and moved out of Schenectady. The theatre was going to be torn down for use of the plot as a parking lot until a group of activists joined together and created the Arts Districts of Schenectady.

In 1984, the Golub Family donated "Goldie" a 1931 Wurlitzer theatre organ to the theatre, replacing the long-lost original organ. The project to restore and install Goldie was undertaken by the Hudson-Mohawk chapter of the American Theatre Organ Society. That year, Proctors named organist Allen Mills as its first artist in residence. The theatre produced two albums of music with Mills: Allen Mills Plays Proctor's and An Old Fashioned Christmas.

In 1988, PBS affiliate WMHT recorded Susannah McCorkle and Friends: Jazz Meets Pop at Proctors, a live concert later broadcast on television featuring jazz vocalist Susannah McCorkle.

Artist Hiroshi Sugimoto visited the theatre to photograph it in 1996. The resulting work was published in his Theaters book in 2000.

In the fall of 2007, Proctors finished a $24.5 million expansion. Several local firms were involved, including Stracher Roth Gilmore (architectural), Ryan-Biggs Associates (structural), M/E Engineering (mechanical, electrical, plumbing) and Adirondack Scenic (theatrical & rigging designers). The renovation added two theatres, making three separate theatre venues available for the public:

1. Main Theatre, with a historic proscenium stage, seats about 2700
2. GE Black Box Theatre, which will seat 450. This multifunctional theatre has retractable seating. This will allow the space to be reconfigured in unusual ways for experimental performances.
3. 440 Upstairs, this 100-seat theatre located in the Wright Family Building at 440 State Street will support smaller performances, such as one man/woman shows, jazz performances, or a place for playwrights to showcase new material with staged readings. {This venue was sold off and the building was demolished in 2011 to make room for construction of the headquarters building of Transfinder.}

In September 2007, upon completion of the expansion project, Proctor's Theatre changed its name to "Proctors" to reflect its three theatres.

On July 18, 2009, the theatre won the Outstanding Historic Theatre Award, presented by the League of Historic American Theatres at their annual meeting in Cleveland. Proctors hosted the group's convention in 2011.

In 2011, with the closure of the Muddy Cup Café chain, Proctors opened their own in-house café. It is named Apostrophe Café as a reference to the removal of the apostrophe from the name of the company.

=== Timeline of the expansion ===
2004:

- Replacement of the 25+ year-old roof
- Acoustic wall built in main theatre to improve sound quality
- Foundation work for new stagehouse begins

2005:

- $1 million sound system installed
- Revamped candy counter
- Tripling the size of the former stagehouse, including a three-bay enclosed loading dock, crossover, and new dressing & multi purpose rooms backstage

2006:

- Construction started for the GE Theatre, which includes 4,000 sq-flat floor theatre, 450 seats that are retractable, and a 60' x 60' wide-format screen and equipment known as iWERKS-ExtremeScreen.
- New carpet in the main theatre
- New furniture in the men's’ lounge of the main theatre
- Restoration of the Golub Arcade
  - Creation of the Ed Sells & Eveline Ward-Sells Green Room
  - Larger and improved gift shops
  - Restoration on decorative plaster work and plaster
  - Removal of paint from frosted glass panels and copper edging

2007:

- Additional construction of the former Carl company

2018:

- In 2018, Proctors Theater took seven weeks and replaced all their main stage seating to bigger and comfier seats, while also fitting in more than originally installed. They now can seat 2,594 patrons in the theaters fixed seating. After adding the total of pit orchestra seats and handicapped seating they can fit 2,700 patrons in the theater.

1st Floor:

- Completion of the GE Theatre
- New box office
- Expanded lobby space for easier patron traffic flow
- More restroom facilities for patrons
- 3-story atrium outside of GE Theatre
- Various retail outlets: Northeastern Fine Jewelry and The Muddy Cup Coffee House & Cafe

2nd Floor:

- Gallery & various conference spaces
- New administrative offices & board room

3rd Floor:
TBD

== See also ==
- Proctor's Theater (Troy, New York)
- National Register of Historic Places listings in Schenectady County, New York
