= John Dabiri =

American engineer and academic (born 1980)

John O. Dabiri
- Dabiri in 2026
- Born: 1980 (age 45–46); Toledo, Ohio
- Citizenship: United States
- Education: Princeton University (BSE); California Institute of Technology (MS, PhD)
- Known for: Vortex formation Reverse engineering of jellyfish Applications to wind turbines
- Awards: PECASE (2008); MacArthur Fellow (2010); Alan T. Waterman Award (2020); National Medal of Science (2025)
- Scientific career
- Fields: Aeronautics; Bioengineering; Mechanical engineering
- Workplaces: California Institute of Technology; Stanford University
- Doctoral advisor: Morteza Gharib

John Oluseun Dabiri is an American engineer and professor at the California Institute of Technology, where he holds appointments in aerospace engineering and mechanical engineering. He is also an independent director on the Board of Directors of NVIDIA. His research focuses on fluid mechanics and fluid dynamics, including applications in biological systems, renewable energy, and environmental flows.

Dabiri studies biological fluid dynamics, including investigations of jellyfish propulsion. He has also developed and studied vertical-axis wind turbine systems inspired by observations of schooling fish.

== Early life and education ==
Born in 1980, Dabiri was raised in Toledo, Ohio, by Nigerian immigrant parents. During his childhood, Dabiri was exposed to engineering concepts through his father's technical work. He attended a Baptist high school where he received his high school diploma.

Dabiri graduated from Princeton University in 2001 with a B.S.E. degree in mechanical and aerospace engineering. He then went to Caltech for graduate studies, graduating with a Master of Science degree in Aeronautics in 2003, a Ph.D. in Bioengineering, and a minor in Aeronautics in 2005.

== Career ==
From 2005 to 2009, Dabiri worked as an assistant professor at Caltech in aeronautics and biological engineering. He was promoted to full professor in 2010. From 2013 to 2014, he was chair of the Faculty Board. During the following school year, he was the Dean of Undergraduates. In 2015, Dabiri became a professor in civil, environmental, and mechanical engineering at Stanford University. He was a senior fellow in Stanford's Center for Turbulence Research and founding director of the Catalyst for Collaborative Solutions initiative. In 2019, he returned to Caltech as the Centennial Chair Professor in aeronautics and mechanical engineering. Dabiri was on the President’s Council of Advisors on Science and Technology (PCAST) from 2021 to January 2025.

Dabiri is on the board of directors of NVIDIA Corporation, the board of trustees of the Gordon and Betty Moore Foundation, and the United States Secretary of Energy Advisory Board (SEAB), and as an advisor to X at Alphabet Inc. (formerly Google X). Additionally, he was the chair of the American Physical Society Division of Fluid Dynamics, and a member of the National Academies' Committee on Science, Technology, and Law. He was on the editorial boards of the Journal of Fluid Mechanics in 2016 and the Journal of the Royal Society Interface in 2014-2023. He was co-chairman of the U.S. National Committee for Theoretical and Applied Mechanics (USNC/TAM) in 2015-2018, and a plenary lecturer at the 2022 USNC/TAM congress.

== Research ==
During his first tenure at Caltech, Dabiri was the director of the Biological Propulsion Laboratory. The lab conducted research on fluid transport applications in aquatic locomotion, fluid dynamic energy conversion, blood flow, and theoretical methods in fluid dynamics and vortex formation. He established the Caltech Field Laboratory for Optimized Wind Energy (FLOWE) in 2011, a wind farm that investigates energy exchange in an array of vertical-axis wind turbines. To further develop digital particle image velocimetry measurements of propulsion in aquatic animals, Dabiri and his student K. Katija designed and patented a device to measure the kinetic energy induced by swimming.

Noting constructive interference in the hydrodynamic wakes of schooling fish, his research suggested that extracting energy from flow vortices could aid more than locomotion. The design of an array of vertical-axis turbines was reported to increase power output per unit land area by more than an order of magnitude compared with horizontal-axis wind farms. Dabiri partnered with Windspire Energy for the use of three of the twenty-four turbines that stand approximately 30 feet tall and 4 feet wide. He founded Scalable Wind Solutions, a company focused on software for wind-turbine array placement optimization. Further research on wind farm design has been led by alumni of his lab working in both academia and industry. Dabiri's research on jellyfish swimming informed U.S. Navy-funded work on biologically inspired underwater propulsion, including the development of an underwater craft that propels itself with up to 30% less energy than conventionally-propelled crafts.

After returning to Caltech, Dabiri’s research has focused on the hydrodynamics of electromechanically modified jellyfish, which has been proposed as a mode for oceanographic sensing and exploration. Dabiri and colleagues have reported experiments in which low-power microelectronics were embedded in live jellyfish to modify propulsion and swimming behavior. An additional area of research in Dabiri’s lab focuses on the physics of turbulence transition. His recent work is exploring the role of the fluid-solid interface in theoretical predictions of turbulence transition.

== Teaching ==
Dabiri was named Professor of the Month at Caltech in February 2012. He has taught classes including a graduate class on propulsion, a biomechanics course, a lab class on experimental methods in aeronautics and applied physics, and the introduction to fluid mechanics course.

In an NPR interview, Dabiri discussed the role of early education and mentorship in STEM fields:

"Having two parents who encouraged me and, in some cases, forced me to study and to really take academics seriously was very important at an early stage. And then going through school, the role of my teachers was always so important. I remember my fourth-grade teacher ... [she] made me believe that I was smart and so I took that and sort of owned that and tried to live up to the expectations that she had placed on me, even as a fourth grader. And so we really want to grab hold of the imagination of the first graders and the second graders at a very early stage, and get them wondering about becoming scientists, as focused as they are about becoming a firefighter or the next rap star."

== Honors and awards ==
Dabiri's early honors include a Young Investigator Award from the Office of Naval Research, a Presidential Early Career Award for Scientists and Engineers, and being named as one of Popular Science magazine's "Brilliant 10" scientists in 2008.

In 2010 Dabiri was awarded a MacArthur Fellowship for his theoretical engineering work. That same year, he gave the Convocation Address at Caltech.

Bloomberg Businessweek magazine listed him among its 2012 Technology Innovators.

Dabiri was awarded the 2020 Alan T. Waterman Award from NSF. In 2023, he was awarded the G. Evelyn Hutchinson Award for aquatic sciences.

He is a Fellow of the American Physical Society and the American Institute for Medical and Biological Engineering.

Dabiri was awarded the National Medal of Science, “for outstanding achievements in aeronautical and biological engineering,” in 2024; the medal was presented at a White House ceremony on January 3, 2025.

== Film consulting ==
In 2021, Dabiri was a scientific consultant for Jordan Peele's science fiction film Nope. His role included advising on the design of the alien featured in the film, taking inspiration from the biology of marine invertebrates such as jellyfish and squid. The goal of the collaboration was to create an aerial predator with the ability to hide in the clouds (hence the scientific name of the fictional race: Occulonimbus edoequus), generate electric fields, and use electric propulsion.

== See also ==
- List of people from Toledo, Ohio

== Notable publications ==
- Dabiri, John O. (2009). "Optimal Vortex Formation as a Unifying Principle in Biological Propulsion". Annual Review of Fluid Mechanics. 41 (1). Annual Reviews: 17–33. Bibcode:2009AnRFM..41...17D. doi:10.1146/annurev.fluid.010908.165232. ISSN 0066-4189. S2CID 17088871. Caltech library # 14170.
