= Mel Long =

American football player (born 1946)

No. 53, 52
- Position: Linebacker

Personal information
- Born: November 22, 1946 (age 79); Toledo, Ohio, U.S.
- Listed height: 6 ft 1 in (1.85 m)
- Listed weight: 230 lb (104 kg)

Career information
- High school: Macomber (Toledo)
- College: Toledo
- NFL draft: 1972: 11th round, 278th overall pick

Career history
- Cleveland Browns (1972–1974)

Awards and highlights
- Consensus All-American (1971); First-team All-American (1970); MAC Defensive Player of the Year (1971); Toledo Rockets No. 77 retired

Career NFL statistics
- Games played: 46
- Stats at Pro Football Reference
- College Football Hall of Fame

Mel Long (born November 22, 1946) is an American former professional football player who was a linebacker in the National Football League (NFL).

== Career ==
=== College ===
He played college football for the Toledo Rockets and high school football for Macomber.

In 1998, he was inducted into the College Football Hall of Fame. The 6–1, 230-pound long played defensive tackle and was a two-time All-American, a first-team in 1970 and a consensus selection in 1971. Long was selected in the 11th round (278th selection) of the 1972 NFL draft by the Cleveland Browns and played for three seasons.

=== Military ===
After receiving his military draft notice, Long enlisted in the Marines and trained as a rifleman. He served in Vietnam from September 23, 1966, to October 18, 1967, where he received the Bronze Star and Navy Cross (after the Medal of Honor, the Navy Cross is the highest Marine/Navy decoration for valor). He participated in Operation Tuscaloosa (January 26, 1967) and Operations Union and Union II (April to June, 1967). During the Battle of Vin Huey, an eight-hour battle in which 70% of U.S. troops were wounded or killed, Long continued to fight for hours after being wounded. Long is the most highly decorated veteran to play professional football.

=== Professional football ===
After leaving the military, Long enrolled at the University of Toledo. Toledo led the nation in defensive statistics all three years. Toledo won the conference all three years and won the Tangerine Bowl all three seasons as well. The 1969 team went 11-0 and beat Davidson 56–35 in the Tangerine Bowl. The following season, their record was 12–0 with a 40–12 victory over William & Mary in the 1970 Tangerine Bowl. And in 1971, it was 12-0 (giving Toledo a 35–0 record for 3 years) and victory over Richmond (28-3) in the Tangerine Bowl.
