= Myron Bell =

American football player (born 1971)

No. 40, 42
- Position: Safety

Personal information
- Born: September 15, 1971 (age 55); Toledo, Ohio, U.S.
- Listed height: 5 ft 11 in (1.80 m)
- Listed weight: 203 lb (92 kg)

Career information
- High school: Macomber (Toledo)
- College: Michigan State
- NFL draft: 1994: 5th round, 140th overall pick

Career history
- Pittsburgh Steelers (1994–1997); Cincinnati Bengals (1998–1999); Pittsburgh Steelers (2000–2001)

Career NFL statistics
- Tackles: 280
- Interceptions: 4
- Sacks: 6.5
- Stats at Pro Football Reference

Myron Corey "Boo" Bell (born September 15, 1971) is an American former professional football player who was a safety in the National Football League (NFL). He played for the Pittsburgh Steelers and Cincinnati Bengals. He was selected in the fifth round of the 1994 NFL draft. He started in Super Bowl XXX. He is a member of the City of Toledo, Ohio Hall of Fame. As a teenager he played at Macomber High School (class of 1989) where he made the All-American 1st team in the state of Ohio for high school football players and also made the city of Toledo, Ohio Hall of Fame. He also teamed up with NBA star and Big Ten Network analyst Jim Jackson to win the 1988–1989 OHSAA Division I basketball championship. He currently works for the Charlotte-Mecklenburg School system with at-risk youth and helps his church with youth sports, with close friends and former NFL football players Brentson Buckner and Adrian Murrell. The youth football league in which they coach together is associated with former NFL football players Ethan Horton, Mike Minter, Michael Dean Perry, and Mike Rucker.
