= Stylex =

Electroclash/new wave band of Ohio

- Origin: Bowling Green, Ohio
- Genres: New wave, electroclash
- Years active: 1999–2007
- Label: Pretend Records
- Members: Joel Roberts; Brian Kantorski; Jeff Loose; Dustin Hostetler
- Website: http://www.stylexohio.com/

Stylex was an electroclash/new wave band formed in Ohio, USA, in 1999.

The band's official record releases include Wonder Program (LP - 2002), False Start (EP - 2003), Auto Focus (LP - 2003), and Tight Scrapes (LP - 2006).

The Auto Focus album was remixed by Thunderbirds Are Now!, Wicked Lung & the Wookalar, Mechanapoipoi, Jeff Loose, Mechanical Cat, goLAB, ANTON, Goodhands Team and Gil Mantera's Party Dream. The resulting LP, Potential Infection, was released in 2004.

In 2007, Stylex announced they would cease playing shows or releasing new music.
