= Michael Brooks (historian and journalist) =

American journalist (born 1964)

Michael E. Brooks
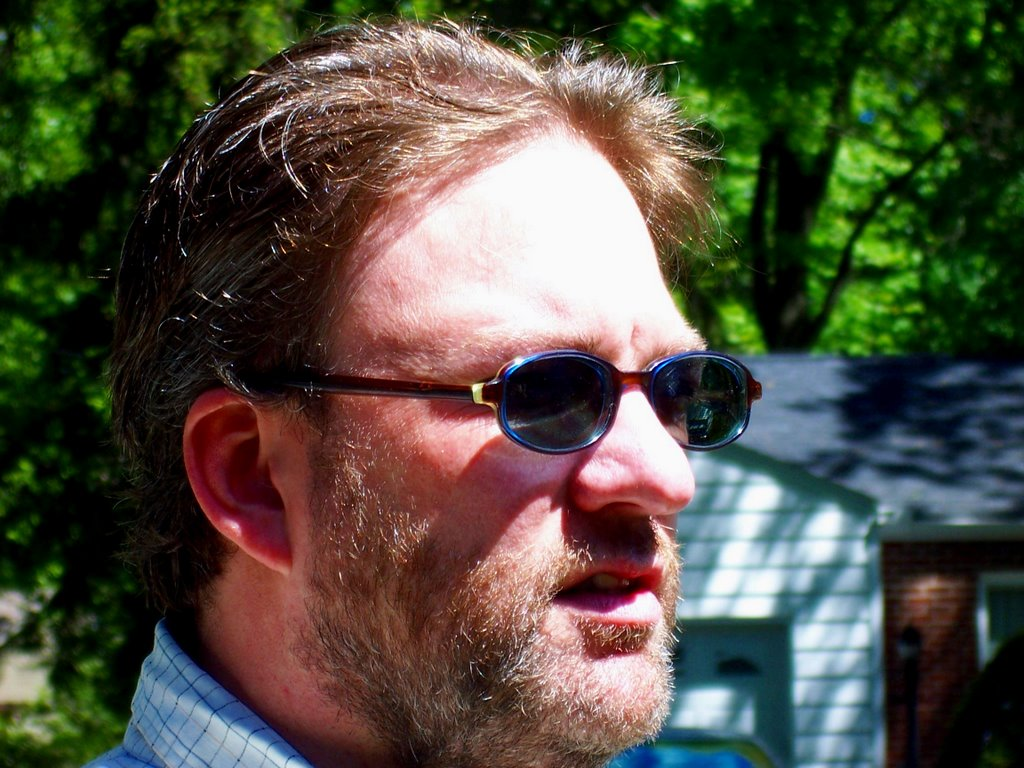
- Born: March 1, 1964 (age 62); Detroit, Michigan, US

Academic background
- Education: University of Toledo

Academic work
- Discipline: History
- Main interests: History of white supremacy

Michael Brooks (born March 1, 1964) is an American historian and investigative journalist. Brooks earned his PhD at the University of Toledo.

== Journalism ==
As a journalist he wrote for the Toledo Free Press, which ceased publication in 2015, and his work has been published in a variety of local, regional and national periodicals.

Brooks won Touchstone Awards in 2004 and 2005 for best news articles in a non-daily periodical, awarded by the Toledo Press Club. He was also awarded an Ohio Newspaper Association award in 2005 for his coverage of conditions at the Toledo Jeep facility, which has been translated into German, Spanish and Portuguese.

== Academia ==
As an academic, Brooks teaches at Bowling Green State University in Bowling Green, Ohio. He has also taught at the University of Toledo, Wayne State University, Monroe County Community College, Owens Community College and Lourdes University. As a historian, Brooks has research interests in epidemiological history, the history of hate groups, and Ohio history.

In 2007, Brooks was awarded a three-year research fellowship by the University of Toledo, which allowed him to travel to European archives. His work has been published in a variety of peer-reviewed journals, and he has contributed chapters to several academic texts, including Natives and Newcomers: Great Lakes Peoples (2010).

Brooks has been engaged in research on the history of the Ku Klux Klan in Northwest Ohio. This work resulted in the publication of his book, The Ku Klux Klan in Wood County, Ohio (2014). In 2021, Brooks published his second book, co-authored with Bob Fitrakis, a study of white supremacy and hate groups in Ohio.

== Bibliography ==
- Brooks, Michael E. The Ku Klux Klan in Wood County. The History Press, 2014.
- Brooks, Michael E. and Fitrakis, Robert. A History of Hate in Ohio: Then and Now. Ohio State University Press, 2021.
