= Louise Markscheffel =

American journalist

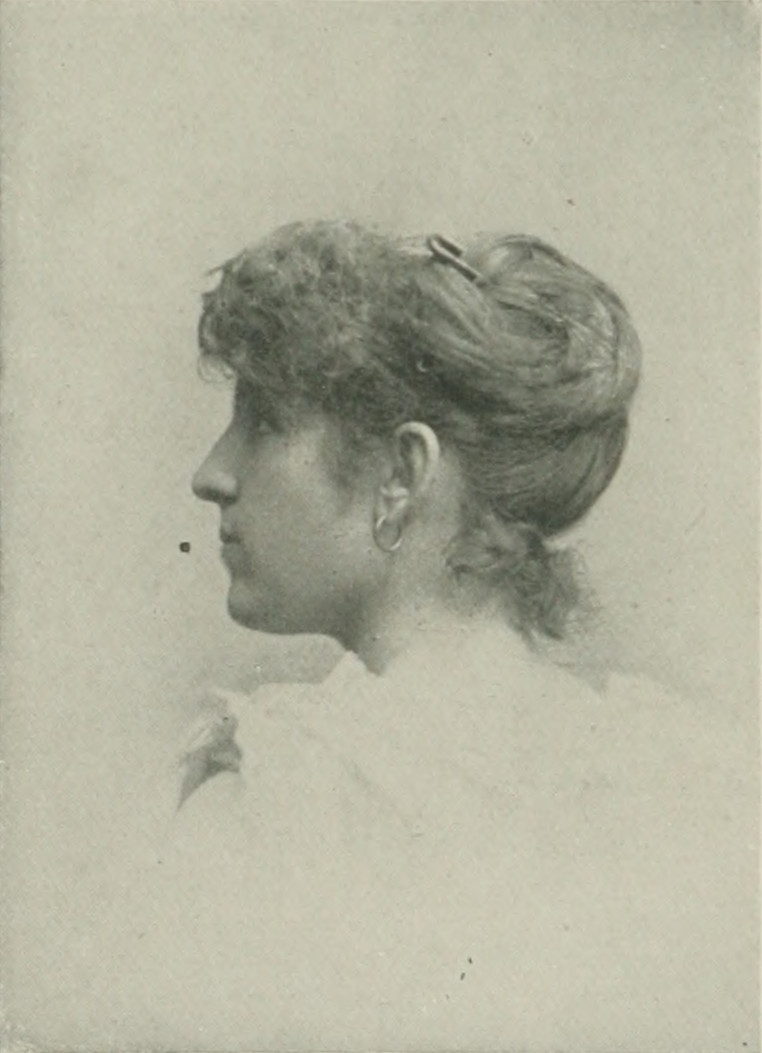
- Photo in A Woman of the Century
- Born: Louise (or Louisa) Weber; 1857; Toledo, Ohio, U.S.
- Died: 1911 (aged 53–54)
- Occupations: editor, critic
- Spouse: Carl Markscheffel (m. 1872; died 1892)
- Children: Carlos Markscheffel
- Writing career
- Notable work: Hints on coffee making : for the use of housekeepers who aim for the best

Signature
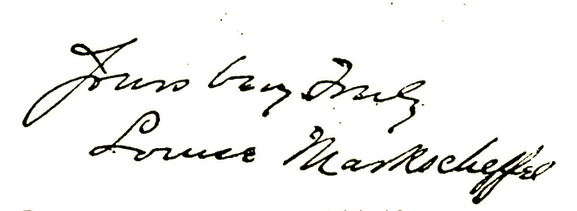

Louise Markscheffel (née, Weber; 1857–1911) was an American literary and society editor of the long nineteenth century, as well as dramatic, musical and literary critic. Beginning in 1887, she served as society editor of the Toledo Journal. In 1897, she published Hints on coffee making : for the use of housekeepers who aim for the best.

== Early life and education ==
Louise (or Louisa) Weber was born in Toledo, Ohio, in 1857. Her mother's father was the president of one of the Cantons of Switzerland. His daughter, Kathrina Zimmerman (July 5, 1832, Siblingen, Schaffhausen, Switzerland - November 29, 1916, Toledo), fell in love and eloped with Caspar Weber (May 30, 1826, Siblingen, Schaffhausen, Switzerland - 18 March 18, 1897, Toledo), a teacher in a Swiss university. The young couple came to the United States, finally fixing their home in Toledo. There, in a strange land, after a hand-to-hand struggle with poverty during those earlier years, Mrs. Weber died during childbirth, bringing Louise the youngest of her children, into the world. Louise's siblings included: Elizabeth, Charlotte, Jacob, Minnie, Emma, John, Helena, Flora, and Gustave.

When but two weeks old, Louise was taken by her father's brother, George Weber, and his wife, to be brought up by them as their own child. She attended the public schools and showed great aptness as a scholar, but at the age of fifteen, her school career was brought to a close by her betrothal and marriage.

== Career ==
She married Carl (or Charles) Markscheffel, a prosperous business man of large property on October 15, 1872. Markscheffel & Co. engaged in wholesale liquors, fancy groceries, and cheese. Four years later her son, Carlos, was born. She was widowed in August, 1892, after her husband suffered a long and painful illness.

Markscheffel began her regular literary work around 1888, when continued misfortunes caused the husband's loss of fortune and bereft him of health and ambition. She became the literary and society editor of the Toledo Sunday Journal. Her work immediately became a marked feature of the publication. She created social columns that were absolutely unique, and delightful even to those who cared nothing for the news details. Her leaders sparkled with bright comments upon things in general, with witty sayings, mingled with pathetic incidents, while underneath ran a current of kindly thought. She was an excellent dramatic, musical and literary critic. She occasionally found time to contribute short stories and sketches to eastern papers.

== Selected works ==
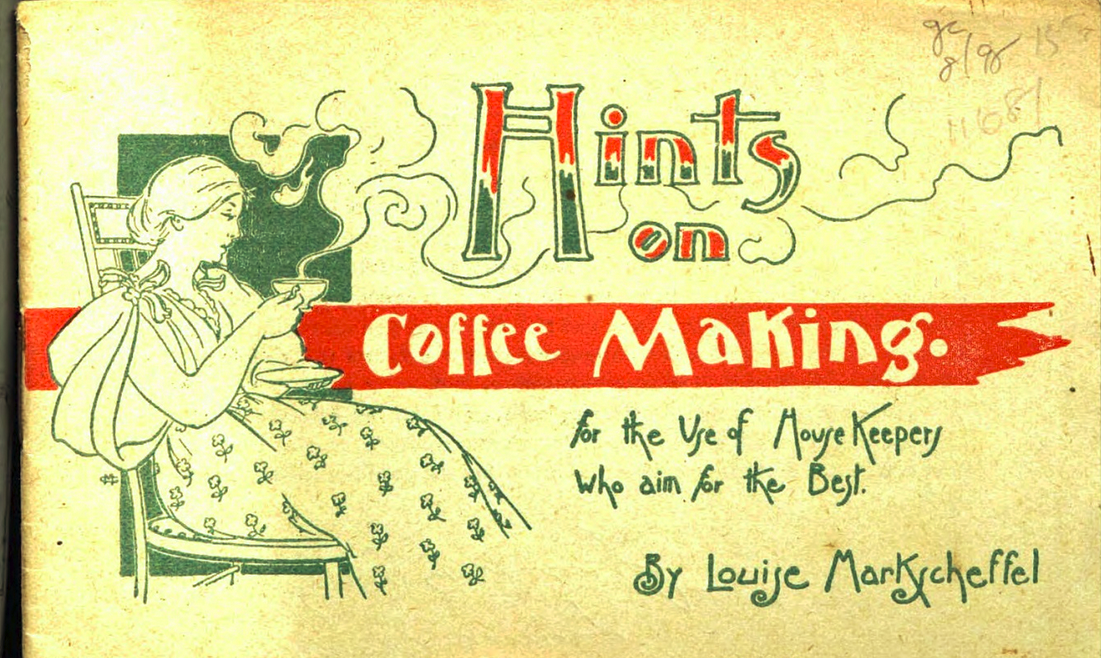
Hints on coffee making, 1897

- Hints on coffee making : for the use of housekeepers who aim for the best, 1897
