= Arland W. Johnson =

American architect

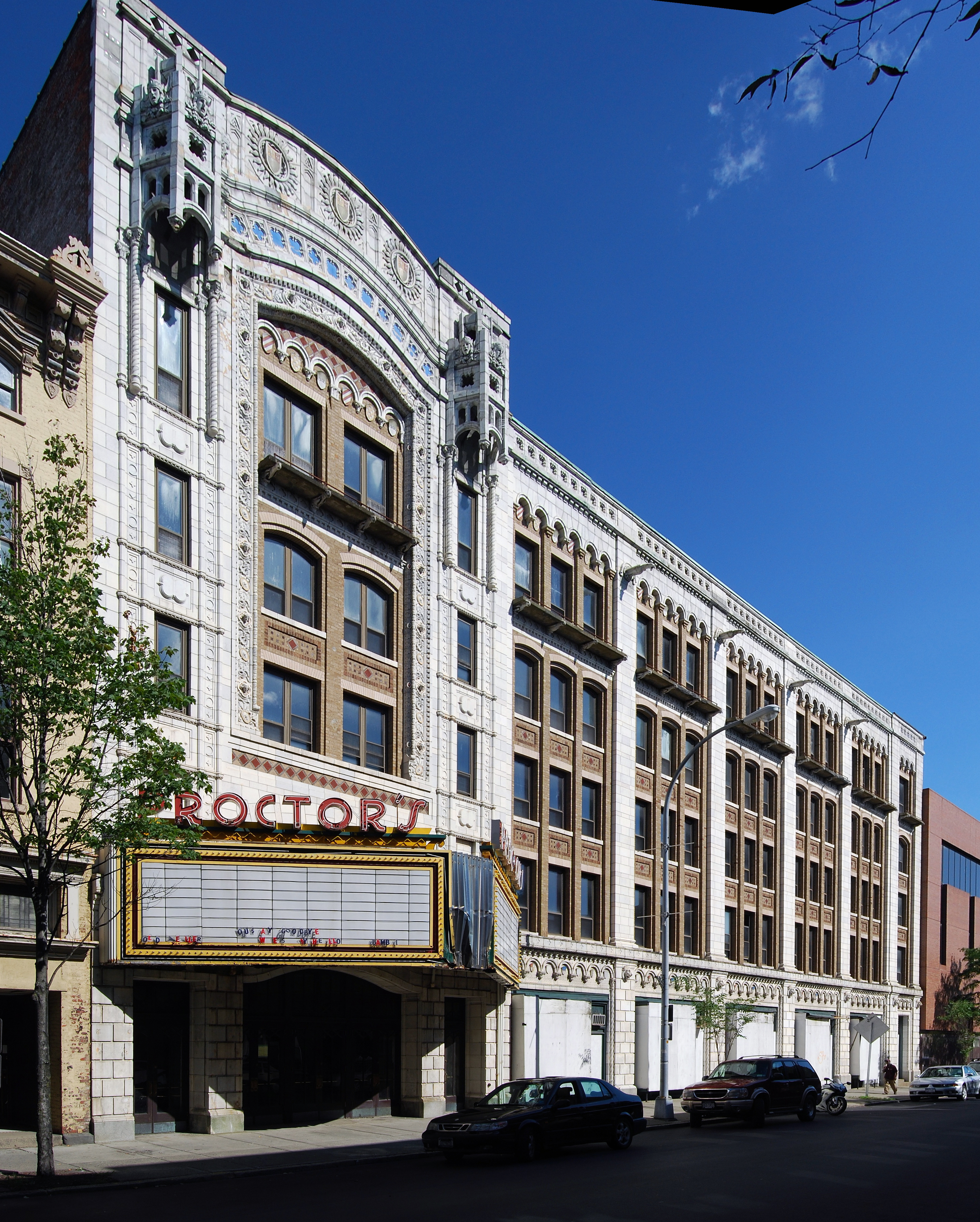
Proctor's Theatre (Troy, New York)

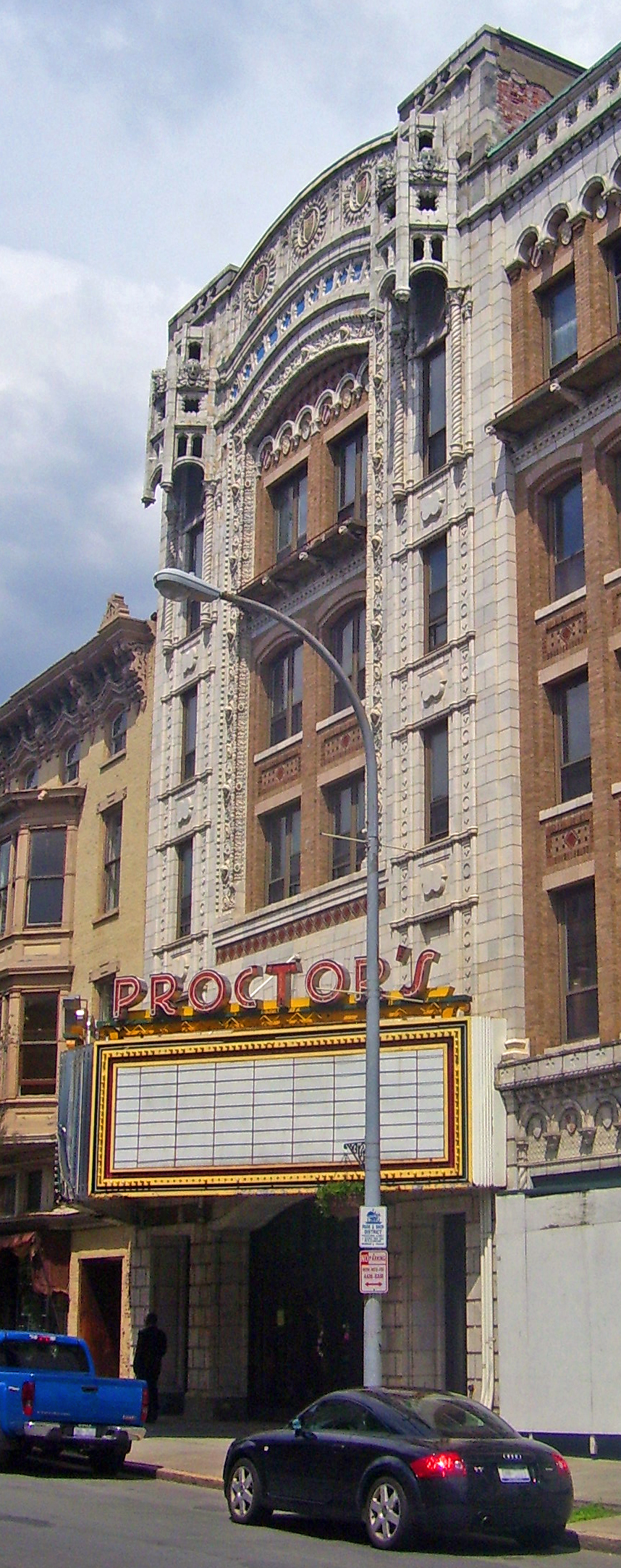
Proctor's Theatre (Troy, New York)

Arland W. Johnson (February 1871 – April 2, 1957) was an American architect. His work included theaters such as Proctor's Theatre in Troy, New York.

Johnson was born in Attica, Indiana to Charles Johnson, a carpenter from Sweden. Arland married Mary E. Hathaway on June 12, 1895. They lived in Toledo, Ohio, where he had an office, then moved to Westchester County, New York in 1912, where he maintained an office in New York City.

== Works ==
- Palladium Theatre (Worcester, Massachusetts) at 261 Main Street (still in use)
- Garde Arts Center at 325 State Street in New London, Connecticut (still in use)
- Eagles Theatre at 106 W. Market Street in Wabash, Indiana (still in use)
- Proctor's Theatre (Troy, New York) at 82 Fourth Street
- Proctor's Theatre (Mount Vernon, New York) at 6 Gramatan Avenue
- Broadway Theatre (Detroit, Michigan) at 1337 Broadway
- Columbia Theater (Sharon, Pennsylvania) at 82 W. State Street
- Commodore Hull Theatre at 65-67 Elizabeth Street in Derby, Connecticut Some of the building's features remain although it has been converted into a parking garage.
- Jefferson Theater (Auburn, New York) at 61 State Street
- Palace Performing Arts Center at 246 College Street in New Haven, Connecticut
- Washington Theatre (Detroit, Michigan) at 1505-1513 Washington Boulevard
