= Static Rituals =

American post-punk band

- Origin: Toledo, Ohio
- Genres: Indie rock, garage rock, new wave
- Years active: 1996–2004, 2012
- Labels: Sin Klub Entertainment, Style Over Substance, Beatboxblues Records, Norka
- Past members: Brett Jan; M Short; William Tuite; Thaddeus Wolfe; Steve Irbe; Mayuko Hayachi; Matthew "Doty" Wood; Alicia Marston; Ben Langlois Jr. Kevin Whaley; Bret Brown; Sam Woldenberg
- Website: staticrituals.bandcamp.com

Static Rituals were a Toledo, OH alternative post-punk band formed in 1996 by M Short and Brett R. Jan (1981–2014). They went through many incarnations over the years, and played their final show in 2011.

== Discography ==
=== Studio albums ===
- Ten Second Dynasty (album, 1997, Style Over Substance)

=== Singles/EPs ===
- Style Over Substance EP (1999, Beatboxblues Records)
- Problems With My Head Cassette Single (2000, Beatboxblues Records)

=== Compilations/Cover Albums ===
- Trading Sirens (2001, Style Over Substance)
- Pre-Curser(2003, Norka)
- All Action, All Gone (2004, Style Over Substance)

== History 1996 - 2004 ==
The band formed in Southeast Michigan, but became a staple in Toledo, Ohio in the mid-to-late 1990s at local rock venues such as Frankie's Inner-City and Mickey Finn's Pub. To date, their most well-known release is their contributions to the Purr Like a Kitten LP compilation, which featured tracks from other Toledo, Ohio and Detroit area musicians such as Jessica Bailiff and Soledad Brothers, among others. There have been many line-up changes in the 12-year history, and because they have slowed down their pace, their live shows in recent years have been up in the air as to whether or not it is going to be a 2-piece, a 5-piece, a punk show, a cover show, drag show, or any other combination of former, special guest or current members. There have been many falling outs, on-stage and off, break-ups and reunions.

== The Steadfast Passion Vacuum 2012 - FUTURE ==
Members are split between Chicago, IL, Toledo, Ohio and Detroit, MI. The only known future plan was to be the release of their fourth full-length studio album, entitled The Steadfast Passion Vacuum. A cassette of the album in its entirety recorded by Jan from start to finish on acoustic guitar and vocals has been floating around in the hands of potential album participants, producers, current & ex-members since 2006. Doug Walker (former drummer for Brian Jonestown Massacre* & former leader of legendary Toledo, Ohio space-noise-pop quartet Xebec has agreed to produce. As for what format (EP, split compilation of EP's being referred to as The 4-EP Project* with The Zimmerman Twins among others; or as a full-length) the album will hit the record store shelves courtesy of one of two old familiar friends of the band: Edward Shimborske III's revamped Sin Klub Entertainment (who released two Rituals' songs on 2000s Exposed III compilation), or former Rituals' bassist Ben Langlois's upstart Old West End Records.*
