= Chuck Webb =

American football player (born 1969)

No. 30
- Position: Running back

Personal information
- Born: November 17, 1969 (age 56); Toledo, Ohio, U.S.
- Listed height: 5 ft 9 in (1.75 m)
- Listed weight: 201 lb (91 kg)

Career information
- High school: Toledo (OH) Macomber
- College: Tennessee
- NFL draft: 1991: 3rd round, 82nd overall pick

Career history
- Green Bay Packers (1991–1992)

Awards and highlights
- First-team All-SEC (1989)

Career NFL statistics
- Kick returns: 2
- Returns yards: 40
- Stats at Pro Football Reference

Charles Eugene Webb (born November 17, 1969) is an American former professional football player who was a running back for two seasons (1991–1992) with the Green Bay Packers of the National Football League (NFL). He was selected by the Packers in the third round of the 1991 NFL draft. He played college football for the Tennessee Volunteers, earning All-SEC honors in 1989, and setting the school's single-game rushing record of 294 yards in a game against Ole Miss on November 18, 1989.

During the second game of Tennessee's 1990 season, Webb suffered a season-ending knee injury from which he never completely recovered.

== Early life ==
Webb was raised in Toledo, Ohio. At age 10, he suffered a broken leg, and was told by doctors at the time that a future in sports was unlikely. He recovered, however, and was a three-year starter at tailback for Toledo's Macomber High School. During his junior year, he rushed for nearly 1,800 yards, and was named "Ohio Back of the Year." In the championship game against Waite, Webb carried 24 times for 311 yards, and twice scored on runs longer than 95 yards. He also ran track, and won the state championship in the 100-meter dash with a time of 10.5 seconds.

Webb entered his senior year at Macomber a preseason All-American. In spite of playing part of the season with a broken hand, he rushed for 1,590 yards, averaging 10.7 yards per carry. He rushed 13 times for 275 yards in a game against DeVilbiss, and carried 13 times for 268 yards and three touchdowns in just one half against Woodward. In an important game against Central Catholic, Webb rushed for 213 yards on just 12 carries, and scored touchdowns on runs of 56 yards, 76 yards, and 15 yards, the latter pulling Macomber to within a point with just a few seconds left in the fourth quarter (a subsequent two-point conversion attempt failed). He was named an All-American by USA Today and several other publications at the end of the season.

Webb's speed (4.3 seconds in the 40-yard dash) and his phenomenal game stats made him one of the top 25 prospects in the nation. He surprisingly chose Tennessee over regional schools Ohio State and Michigan State. He stated in an interview that he preferred the run-oriented offense of Tennessee head coach Johnny Majors.

== College career ==
Webb redshirted during the 1988 season at Tennessee as star running back Reggie Cobb handled the bulk of the rushing duties. Following a disastrous start to the season, Tennessee's young offensive line began to gel, and the Vols finished the year with five consecutive wins. With Cobb suspended during spring practice in 1989, Webb carried 11 times for 83 yards in the Orange and White Game.

Webb entered the 1989 season as a backup to Cobb. The two talented backs formed a powerful running combination that became known as "the Cobb-Webb connection". Playing behind Cobb, Webb rushed for 134 yards and two touchdowns in a win over UCLA, picked up 93 yards and a touchdown in a key win over Auburn, and ran for 83 yards and a touchdown in a win over Georgia. After Cobb was kicked off the team for failing a drug test, Webb became the starter. He carried 23 times for 111 yards and a touchdown in a losing effort to Alabama before reeling off a string of impressive games, including a 132-yard outing against LSU, and a 162-yard outing against Akron. In the Vols' win over Ole Miss, Webb rushed 35 times for 294 yards, breaking the single-game rushing record of 248 yards set by Johnnie Jones in 1983. He finished his regular season with 27 carries for 145 yards against Kentucky (he missed the regular season finale against Vanderbilt with an injury). In Tennessee's win over Arkansas in the 1990 Cotton Bowl, Webb exploded for 250 yards and two touchdowns, including a 78-yard score in the third quarter, to win "Offensive Player of the Game" honors. Though he started just five games, Webb finished the regular season with 1,236 yards, the second-highest total in the SEC behind Emmitt Smith, and the eighth-highest in the nation.

Entering the 1990 season as one of the nation's premier running backs, Webb carried 27 times for 131 yards in Tennessee's season-opening tie against Colorado. During the second game of the season against Pacific, Webb suffered a torn ACL early in the first quarter, effectively ending his season. Rather than risk further injury, Webb opted to forgo his remaining eligibility and enter the 1991 NFL draft.

As of the 2012 season, Webb's 294-yard outing against Ole Miss in 1989 remains the highest single-game total in school history, and his 250-yard tally in the 1990 Cotton Bowl remains the school's second-highest single-game total. His average of 5.91 yards-per-carry in 1989 remains a school single-season record for running backs with a minimum of 200 carries. In 2013, Webb was honored as a Vol "Legend of the Game" during Tennessee's season-opener against Austin Peay.

== Professional career ==
Undergoing surgery to repair his right knee, Webb was selected by the Green Bay Packers in the third round of the 1991 NFL draft with the 82nd overall pick. His knee continued bothering him during training camp, however, and he again underwent surgery to repair torn cartilage in the knee. He spent the first part of his rookie year on injured reserve, and wasn't activated until the Packers' game against Minnesota in November. He played only marginally, however, and retired following the 1992 season.
