= Louis Effler =

American doctor and writer (1888–1978)

Louis Robert Effler
- Born: 9 December 1888; Toledo, Ohio, United States
- Died: 23 December 1978 (aged 90)
- Scientific career
- Fields: Medicine

Louis Robert Effler was an American ear, nose and throat doctor, popular medical writer and occasional travel writer and local historian.
