= The Writings of Henry D. Thoreau =

The Writings of Henry D. Thoreau is a project that aims to provide, for the first time, accurate texts of the complete works of American author Henry David Thoreau, including his journal, personal letters, and writings for publication. Since the project was founded in 1966, Princeton University Press has published 18 of its volumes. It is based at the University of California, Santa Barbara Library, and has been directed by Elizabeth Witherell since 1980. The project has in the past been funded by the National Endowment for the Humanities (NEH) and the National Trust for the Humanities, and is now funded by UC Santa Barbara.

There were already editions of Thoreau's works until the title The Writings of Henry David Thoreau in 1893 (10 volumes), 1899, 1900, and 1906 (20 volumes).

== Progress ==
The project has published 19 volumes:

- Walden (1971)
- The Maine Woods (1972)
- Reform Papers (1973)
- Early Essays and Miscellanies (1975)
- A Week on the Concord and Merrimack Rivers (1980)
- Journal 1: 1837-1844 (1981)
- Journal 2: 1842-1848 (1984)
- Translations (1986)
- Cape Cod (1988)
- Journal 3: 1848-1851 (1990)
- Journal 4: 1851-1852 (1992)
- Journal 5: 1852-1853 (1997)
- Journal 6: 1853 (2000)
- Journal 8: 1854 (2002)
- Excursions (2007)
- Journal 7: 1853-1854 (2009)
- Correspondence 1: 1834-1848 (2013)
- Correspondence 2: 1849-1856 (2018)
- Correspondence 3: 1857-1862 (2026) .

When complete, the project will comprise 30 volumes. The remaining 11, now in progress, contain works that are either unpublished or that have previously been incorrectly or incompletely transcribed: Poems, Nature Essays (2 volumes), and Journals 9-16.

== Online journal transcripts ==
Images of the sixteen manuscript volumes Thoreau kept from 1854 through 1861 are available online by the courtesy of the Morgan Library & Museum. Links to these transcripts can be found on the project's website.

== Award ==
In June 2003, NEH designated the Thoreau Edition a "We the People" project, citing Thoreau's important influence on American history and culture.

== See also ==
- Henry David Thoreau
- Princeton University Press
