= Elizabeth Hall Witherell =

- Born: August 15, 1948 (age 77); Columbus, Ohio, USA
- Occupations: Literary historian and scholarly editor
- Known for: Editor-in-chief of The Writings of Henry D. Thoreau

Elizabeth Hall Witherell (born August 15, 1948) is a literary historian and scholarly editor. Since 1980, she has been the editor-in-chief of The Writings of Henry D. Thoreau, a documentary editing project founded in 1966 that aims to provide, for the first time, accurate and complete texts of the published works, the Journal, and the correspondence of the 19th century American scientific naturalist, transcendalist, and writer Henry David Thoreau (1817-1862). Witherell served as President of the Association for Documentary Editing from 1992 to 1993 and as President of the Thoreau Society from 1996 to 2000.

== Career ==
Witherell was appointed editor-in-chief of the Thoreau Edition in 1980, when it was a research project at Princeton University. She moved the project to the University of California, Santa Barbara (UCSB) in 1983, to Northern Illinois University in 1999, and back to UCSB in 2005. The project is headquartered in the UCSB library.

Under Witherell's direction, the Thoreau project has published 14 volumes with Princeton University Press

- A Week on the Concord and Merrimack Rivers (1980)
- Journal, volumes 1-8 (1981-2002)
- Translations (1986)
- Cape Cod (1988)
- Excursions (2007)
- Correspondence, volumes 1-3 (2013-2026).
The full list of the volumes published by the Thoreau project can be found at The Writings of Henry D. Thoreau. In addition to her role as editor-in-chief, Witherell served as a co-editor on A Week on the Concord and Merrimack Rivers, Journal Vol. 1, Correspondence Vol. 2 and Correspondence Vol. 3.

Witherell also was the editor for Thoreau: Collected Essays and Poems, a volume in The Library of America's Thoreau series.

Witherell is one of the editors of Digital Thoreau, a joint project of the State University of New York at Geneseo, the Thoreau Society, and the Walden Woods Project. Digital Thoreau publishes a fluid text edition of Walden, the Walden manuscript project, and The Readers' Thoreau.

In the process of preparing the volumes of the Thoreau Edition, Witherell has compiled a great deal of information about the contents and locations of Thoreau's manuscripts. Some of this information is available on the project's website. In the Walter Harding lecture, delivered at the campus of SUNY Geneseo in 2016, Witherell demonstrated how new imaging methods and policies of open access to archival material have made it possible to glean new information about Thoreau's life and thought from careful, contextualized examination of his manuscripts. Witherell also delivered the keynote address at the annual meeting of the Thoreau Society in 2016.

Witherell wrote a commentary for the Ninja Press volume Emerson & Thoreau/Spirit & Matter, a fine press edition including experts from two essays, "Nature" by Ralph Waldo Emerson and "Ktaadn" by Henry David Thoreau.

== In the press ==
New Yorker staff writer John McPhee consulted with Witherell when he was working on the 38-page introduction he contributed to the Princeton Classic Edition of A Week on the Concord and Merrimack Rivers. He also published a slightly modified version of this introduction as a New Yorker article, "Paddling after Henry David Thoreau". In both versions of the essay, McPhee quotes Witherell's description of how Thoreau came to write A Week:

"John died in January, 1842. His younger brother decided to memorialize him in a book in which he would combine an account of the trip with philosophical observations and meditations.” And she went on to say that “Thoreau looks first at and then through the landscape”; he is demonstrating “the timelessness at the heart of change.”

Several writers have interviewed Witherell about her research on Thoreau's life and work. Israel Shenker wrote a 1977 feature article about Thoreau and the project in the New York Times. Carla Hall wrote a 1990 profile for the Washington Post that covered Witherell's first 24 years research on Thoreau and his writings. Donovan Hohn quoted her in his 2015 article "Everybody Hates Henry" in the New Republic.

The Harvard Gazette, the official news website for Harvard University, interviewed Witherell in connection with a 2015 article titled "Uncovering what Thoreau uncovered." The article describes the context for Thoreau's notes from the scene of the Fire Island shipwreck in which social reformer and writer Margaret Fuller died. The Houghton Library had recently acquired these notes in the form of a 18-page manuscript, and Witherell offered her expert services to transcribe them.

Over many years, Witherell has become accomplished at reading Thoreau's handwriting. Megan Marshall quoted her as a subject expert in a Slate article entitled "The Impossible Art of Deciphering Manuscripts."

== Service and Honors ==
Witherell served as president of the Thoreau Society from 1996 to 2000. The Society honored her with the Thoreau Society medal at their annual meeting in 2008. Witherell also delivered the keynote address at the annual meeting of the Thoreau Society in 2016.

Witherell served on the Ecological Land Management committee at Fermilab from 1999 to 2005. She was the Executive Producer for a video about the Fermilab tallgrass prairie project, Part and Parcel of Nature: Illinois Tallgrass Prairie at Fermilab. The title of the video is taken from the first sentence of Thoreau's essay "Walking", which was published in the Atlantic in 1862, a month after his death:

I wish to speak a word for Nature, for absolute freedom and wildness, as contrasted with a freedom and culture merely civil, — to regard man as an inhabitant, or a part and parcel of Nature, rather than a member of society.

Witherell recruited actor Hector Elizondo to narrate this video.
