= September 10 =

September 10 this year in various calendars
- Thursday, 10 September 2026
Akan	Nkyiyaw
Armenian	22 Hoṙi 1476
Aztec	Tititl 3, 10 Ozomahtli
Babylonian	27 Abu, 2337 SE
Balinese pawukon	Menga, Kajeng, Sri, Keliwon, Urukung, Wraspati of Menail, Ludra, Gigis, Manusa
Bengali	26 Bhadro, BS 1433
Chinese	Yin Fire Pig・Well Mansion; Fire Horse Year, Month 7, Day 29 (Bailu, 13 days until Qiufen)
Common Era	10 September 2026 CE
Coptic	5 Nesi, AM 1742
Egyptian	27 Tybi, 2775 NE
Ethiopian	5 Pāguemēn, 2018 Amätä Məhrät
French Republican	Décade III, Quartidi de Fructidor de l'Année 234 de la République
Gregorian	10 September, AD 2026
Hebrew	28 Elul, AM 5786
Hindu	Maghā・Siddha; Solar: 25 Bhādrapada, 1948 SE; Lunisolar: Caturdaśī, Kṛishna pakṣa of Śrāvaṇa, 2083 VE; Rāudra・5127 KY・1,872,828
Icelandic	Fimmtudagur, 17 Tvímánuður 2026
Islamic	27 Rabi' al-awwal, AH 1448 (using tabular method)
ISO week date	2026-W37-4
Japanese	29 Fumizuki, Reiwa 8 (Hakuro, 13 days until Shūbun)
Julian	28 August, AD 2026 (AM 7534)
Julian day	2461294
Korean	29 Wonsungidal, 4359 DE
Maya	13.0.13.16.11; 4 Chen, 10 Chuen
Roman	ante diem V Kalendas Septembres, MMDCCLXXIX AUC
Solar Hijri	19 Shahrivar, SH 1405
Tibetan	29 gro bzhin, me pho rta 2153 or 1772 or 1000

<<	September					>>
Su	Mo	Tu	We	Th	Fr	Sa
		1	2	3	4	5
6	7	8	9	10	11	12
13	14	15	16	17	18	19
20	21	22	23	24	25	26
27	28	29	30
2026

September 10 in recent years
2026 (Thursday)
2025 (Wednesday)
2024 (Tuesday)
2023 (Sunday)
2022 (Saturday)
2021 (Friday)
2020 (Thursday)
2019 (Tuesday)
2018 (Monday)
2017 (Sunday)

September 10 is the 253rd day of the year (254th in leap years) in the Gregorian calendar; 112 days remain until the end of the year.

== Events ==
=== Pre-1600 ===
- 422 – Election of pope Celestine I following the death of pope Boniface I earlier that month.
- 506 – The bishops of Visigothic Gaul meet in the Council of Agde.
- 1089 – The first synod of pope Urban II starts in Melfi, with seventy bishops and twelve abbots in attendance. The synod issues several decrees about church law and deals with the relation with the Greek part of the Church.
- 1419 – John the Fearless, Duke of Burgundy is assassinated by adherents of the Dauphin, the future Charles VII of France.
- 1509 – An earthquake known as "The Lesser Judgment Day" hits Constantinople.
- 1515 – Thomas Wolsey is invested as a Cardinal.
- 1547 – The Battle of Pinkie, the last full-scale military confrontation between England and Scotland, resulting in a decisive victory for the forces of Edward VI.
- 1561 – Fourth Battle of Kawanakajima: Takeda Shingen defeats Uesugi Kenshin in the climax of their ongoing conflicts.
- 1570 – Spanish Jesuit missionaries land in present-day Virginia to establish the short-lived Ajacán Mission.
- 1573 – German pirate Klein Henszlein and 33 of his crew are beheaded in Hamburg.

=== 1601–1900 ===
- 1607 – Edward Maria Wingfield is ousted as first president of the governing council of the Colony of Virginia; he is replaced by John Ratcliffe.
- 1608 – John Smith is elected council president of Jamestown, Virginia.
- 1622 – Fifty-five Christians are executed in Nagasaki during the Great Genna Martyrdom.
- 1640 – Reapers' War: Junta de Braços (Assembly of Estates) of the Principality of Catalonia summoned. It assumes the sovereignty and enacts a series of revolutionary measures which will lead to the Catalan Republic.
- 1724 – Johann Sebastian Bach leads the first performance of Jesu, der du meine Seele, BWV 78, a chorale cantata based on a passion hymn by Johann Rist.
- 1776 – American Revolutionary War: Nathan Hale volunteers to spy for the Continental Army.
- 1798 – At the Battle of St. George's Caye, British Honduras defeats Spain.
- 1813 – The United States defeats a British Fleet at the Battle of Lake Erie during the War of 1812.
- 1844 – The treaty of Tangier ends the Franco-Moroccan War, which Morocco lost, and forces it to recognise the French possessions in Algeria.
- 1846 – Elias Howe is granted a patent for the sewing machine.
- 1858 – George Mary Searle discovers the asteroid 55 Pandora.
- 1897 – Lattimer massacre: A sheriff's posse kills 19 unarmed striking immigrant miners in Lattimer, Pennsylvania, United States.
- 1898 – Empress Elisabeth of Austria is assassinated by Luigi Lucheni.

=== 1901–present ===
- 1918 – Russian Civil War: The Red Army captures Kazan.
- 1919 – The Republic of German-Austria signs the Treaty of Saint-Germain-en-Laye, ceding significant territories to Italy, Yugoslavia, and Czechoslovakia.
- 1932 – The New York City Subway's third competing subway system, the municipally owned IND, is opened.
- 1936 – The first world individual Speedway World Championship was held at London's Wembley Stadium.
- 1937 – Nine nations attend the Nyon Conference to address international piracy in the Mediterranean Sea.
- 1939 – World War II: The submarine HMS Oxley is mistakenly sunk by the submarine HMS Triton near Norway and becomes the Royal Navy's first loss of a submarine in the war.
- 1939 – World War II: The Canadian declaration of war on Germany receives royal assent.
- 1942 – World War II: The British Army carries out an amphibious landing on Madagascar to re-launch Allied offensive operations in the Madagascar Campaign.
- 1943 – World War II: In the course of Operation Achse, German troops begin their occupation of Rome.
- 1960 – At the Summer Olympics in Rome, Abebe Bikila becomes the first sub-Saharan African to win a gold medal, winning the marathon in bare feet.
- 1961 – In the Italian Grand Prix, a crash causes the death of German Formula One driver Wolfgang von Trips and 15 spectators who are hit by his Ferrari, the deadliest accident in F1 history.
- 1961 – A President Airlines Douglas DC-6 crashes just after takeoff from Shannon Airport, Ireland. All 83 passengers and crew are killed.
- 1967 – The people of Gibraltar vote to remain a British dependency rather than becoming part of Spain.
- 1974 – Guinea-Bissau gains independence from Portugal.
- 1976 – A British Airways Hawker Siddeley Trident and an Inex-Adria DC-9 collide near Zagreb, Yugoslavia, killing 176.
- 1976 – TWA Flight 355 is hijacked by five Croatian nationalists. The hijackers surrender upon landing in Paris.
- 1976 – An Indian Airlines flight is hijacked by six Kashmiri separatists and diverted to Lahore International Airport, where the passengers and crew are released.
- 1977 – Hamida Djandoubi, convicted of torture and murder, is the last person to be executed by guillotine in France.
- 2000 – Operation Barras successfully frees six British soldiers held captive for over two weeks and contributes to the end of the Sierra Leone Civil War.
- 2001 – Antônio da Costa Santos, mayor of Campinas, Brazil is assassinated.
- 2001 – During his appearance on the British TV game show Who Wants to be a Millionaire?, contestant Charles Ingram reaches the £1 million top prize, but it was later revealed that he had cheated to the top prize by listening to coughs from his wife and another contestant.
- 2002 – Switzerland, traditionally a neutral country, becomes a full member of the United Nations.
- 2007 – Former Prime Minister of Pakistan Nawaz Sharif returns to Pakistan after seven years in exile, following a military coup in October 1999.
- 2008 – The Large Hadron Collider at CERN, described as the biggest scientific experiment in history, is powered up in Geneva, Switzerland.
- 2017 – Hurricane Irma makes landfall on Cudjoe Key, Florida as a Category 4, after causing catastrophic damage throughout the Caribbean. Irma resulted in 134 deaths and $77.2 billion (2017 USD) in damage.
- 2024 – Polaris Dawn, the first private crewed spaceflight to involve a spacewalk, is launched from the Kennedy Space Center in Florida.
- 2025 – American right-wing political activist Charlie Kirk is assassinated while onstage at Utah Valley University in Orem, Utah.
- 2025 – A liquefied petroleum gas tank truck overturns and explodes in Iztapalapa, Mexico City, killing 32 people and injuring 90 others.

== Births ==
=== Pre-1600 ===
- 877 – Eutychius, patriarch of Alexandria (died 940)
- 904 – Guo Wei, posthumously known as Emperor Taizu of Later Zhou
- 1423 – Eleanor, Princess of Asturias (died 1425)
- 1487 – Pope Julius III (died 1555)
- 1497 – Wolfgang Musculus, German theologian (died 1563)
- 1547 – George I, Landgrave of Hesse-Darmstadt (died 1596)
- 1550 – Alonso Pérez de Guzmán, 7th Duke of Medina Sidonia, Spanish general (died 1615)
- 1561 – Hernando Arias de Saavedra, Paraguayan-Argentinian soldier and politician (died 1634)
- 1588 – Nicholas Lanier, English singer-songwriter and lute player (died 1666)

=== 1601–1900 ===
- 1624 – Thomas Sydenham, English physician and author (died 1689)
- 1638 – Maria Theresa of Spain (died 1683)
- 1655 – Caspar Bartholin the Younger, Danish anatomist (died 1738)
- 1659 – Henry Purcell, English organist and composer (died 1695)
- 1714 – Niccolò Jommelli, Italian composer (died 1774)
- 1753 – John Soane, English architect and academic, designed the Royal Academy and Freemasons' Hall (died 1837)
- 1758 – Hannah Webster Foster, American author (died 1840)
- 1786 – Nicolás Bravo, Mexican soldier and politician, 11th President of Mexico (died 1854)
- 1786 – William Mason, American surgeon and politician (died 1860)
- 1787 – John J. Crittenden, American statesman and politician (died 1863)
- 1787 – Justina Jeffreys, Jamaican-born British gentlewoman (died 1869)
- 1788 – Jacques Boucher de Crèvecœur de Perthes, French archaeologist and author (died 1868)
- 1793 – Harriet Arbuthnot, English diarist (died 1834)
- 1801 – Marie Laveau, American voodoo practitioner (died 1881)
- 1821 – William Jervois, English captain, engineer, and politician, 10th Governor of South Australia (died 1897)
- 1836 – Joseph Wheeler, American general and politician (died 1906)
- 1839 – Isaac K. Funk, American minister and publisher, co-founded Funk & Wagnalls (died 1912)
- 1839 – Charles Sanders Peirce, American mathematician, statistician, and philosopher (died 1914)
- 1844 – Abel Hoadley, English-Australian confectioner, created the Violet Crumble (died 1918)
- 1852 – Hans Niels Andersen, Danish businessman, founded the East Asiatic Company (died 1937)
- 1852 – Alice Brown Davis, American tribal chief (died 1935)
- 1857 – James Edward Keeler, American astronomer (rings of Saturn) (died 1900)
- 1860 – Marianne von Werefkin, Russian-Swiss painter (died 1938)
- 1864 – Carl Correns, German botanist and geneticist (died 1933)
- 1866 – Jeppe Aakjær, Danish author and poet (died 1930)
- 1871 – Charles Collett, English engineer (died 1952)
- 1872 – Ranjitsinhji, Indian cricketer (died 1933)
- 1874 – Mamie Dillard, African American educator, clubwoman and suffragist (died 1954)
- 1875 – George Hewitt Myers, American forester and philanthropist (died 1957)
- 1875 – Nicolás Zamora, First Filipino to be ordained as Protestant minister (died 1914)
- 1876 – Hugh D. McIntosh, Australian businessman (died 1942)
- 1880 – Georgia Douglas Johnson, American poet and playwright (died 1966)
- 1880 – Laura Cornelius Kellogg, Native American activist (died 1947)
- 1884 – Herbert Johanson, Estonian architect (died 1964)
- 1885 – Johannes de Jong, Dutch cardinal (died 1955)
- 1885 – Carl Clinton Van Doren, American critic and biographer (died 1950)
- 1886 – H.D., American poet, novelist, and memoirist (died 1961)
- 1887 – Giovanni Gronchi, Italian soldier and politician, 3rd President of the Italian Republic (died 1978)
- 1887 – Kenneth Mason, English soldier and geographer (died 1976)
- 1887 – Govind Ballabh Pant, Indian lawyer and politician, 1st Chief Minister of Uttar Pradesh (died 1961)
- 1888 – Israel Abramofsky, Russian-American painter (died 1976)
- 1889 – Ivar Böhling, Finnish wrestler (died 1929)
- 1890 – Bob Heffron, New Zealand-Australian miner and politician, 30th Premier of New South Wales (died 1978)
- 1890 – Elsa Schiaparelli, Italian-French fashion designer (died 1973)
- 1890 – Franz Werfel, Austrian-Bohemian author, poet, and playwright (died 1945)
- 1890 – Mortimer Wheeler, British archaeologist and officer (died 1976)
- 1892 – Arthur Compton, American physicist and academic, Nobel Prize laureate (died 1962)
- 1894 – Alexander Dovzhenko, Soviet screenwriter/producer/director of Ukrainian origin (died 1956)
- 1895 – Viswanatha Satyanarayana, Indian poet and author (died 1976)
- 1896 – Adele Astaire, American actress and dancer (died 1981)
- 1896 – Robert Taschereau, Canadian lawyer, judge, and politician, 11th Chief Justice of Canada (died 1970)
- 1896 – Ye Ting, Chinese general (died 1946)
- 1897 – Georges Bataille, French philosopher, novelist, and poet (died 1962)
- 1897 – Hilde Hildebrand, German actress and singer (died 1976)
- 1898 – Bessie Love, American actress (died 1986)
- 1898 – Waldo Semon, American chemist and engineer (died 1999)

=== 1901–present ===
- 1903 – Cyril Connolly, English author and critic (died 1974)
- 1904 – Honey Craven, American horse rider and manager (died 2003)
- 1904 – Max Shachtman, American theorist and politician (died 1972)
- 1906 – Karl Wien, German geographer, academic, and mountaineer (died 1937)
- 1907 – Alva R. Fitch, American general (died 1989)
- 1907 – Dorothy Hill, Australian geologist and palaeontologist (died 1997)
- 1908 – Angus Bethune, Australian soldier and politician, 33rd Premier of Tasmania (died 2004)
- 1908 – Raymond Scott, American pianist, composer, and bandleader (died 1994)
- 1908 – Waldo Rudolph Wedel, American archaeologist and author (died 1996)
- 1912 – Basappa Danappa Jatti, Indian lawyer and politician, 5th Vice President of India (died 2002)
- 1913 – Lincoln Gordon, American academic and diplomat, United States Ambassador to Brazil (died 2009)
- 1914 – Terence O'Neill, Baron O'Neill of the Maine, Anglo-Irish captain and politician, 4th Prime Minister of Northern Ireland (died 1990)
- 1914 – Robert Wise, American director and producer (died 2005)
- 1915 – Edmond O'Brien, American actor (died 1985)
- 1917 – Miguel Serrano, Chilean poet and diplomat (died 2009)
- 1919 – Lex van Delden, Dutch composer (died 1988)
- 1920 – Fabio Taglioni, Italian engineer (died 2001)
- 1921 – Joann Lõssov, Estonian basketball player and coach (died 2000)
- 1921 – John W. Morris, American general (died 2013)
- 1923 – Glen P. Robinson, American businessman, founded Scientific Atlanta (died 2013)
- 1924 – Ted Kluszewski, American baseball player and coach (died 1988)
- 1924 – Boyd K. Packer, American educator and religious leader, 26th President of the Quorum of the Twelve Apostles (died 2015)
- 1925 – Roy Brown, American singer-songwriter (died 1981)
- 1925 – Dick Lucas, English minister and cleric
- 1925 – Boris Tchaikovsky, Russian pianist and composer (died 1996)
- 1926 – Beryl Cook, English painter and illustrator (died 2008)
- 1927 – Johnny Keating, Scottish trombonist, composer, and producer (died 2015)
- 1928 – Roch Bolduc, Canadian civil servant and politician
- 1928 – Walter Ralston Martin, American minister and author, founded the Christian Research Institute (died 1989)
- 1928 – Jean Vanier, Canadian philosopher and humanitarian, founded L'Arche (died 2019)
- 1929 – Michel Bélanger, Canadian businessman and banker (died 1997)
- 1929 – John Golding, English historian, scholar, and curator (died 2012)
- 1929 – Arnold Palmer, American golfer and businessman (died 2016)
- 1929 – Paul Terasaki, American scientist, invented tissue typing for organ transplants and founded first kidney transplant registry (died 2016)
- 1930 – Aino Kukk, Estonian chess player and engineer (died 2006)
- 1931 – Isabel Colegate, English author and agent (died 2023)
- 1931 – Philip Baker Hall, American actor (died 2022)
- 1932 – Bo Goldman, American playwright, screenwriter, and producer (died 2023)
- 1933 – Yevgeny Khrunov, Russian colonel and cosmonaut (died 2000)
- 1933 – Karl Lagerfeld, German-French fashion designer and photographer (died 2019)
- 1934 – Charles Kuralt, American journalist (died 1997)
- 1934 – Roger Maris, American baseball player and coach (died 1985)
- 1934 – Jim Oberstar, American educator and politician (died 2014)
- 1934 – Larry Sitsky, Australian pianist, composer, and educator
- 1934 – Mr. Wrestling II, American wrestler (died 2020)
- 1935 – Mary Oliver, American poet (died 2019)
- 1936 – Peter Lovesey, British writer (died 2025)
- 1937 – Jared Diamond, American biologist, geographer, and author
- 1937 – Tommy Overstreet, American singer-songwriter and guitarist (died 2015)
- 1938 – David Hamilton, English radio and television host
- 1939 – Cynthia Lennon, first wife of Beatle John Lennon (1962–68), and mother of Julian Lennon (died 2015)
- 1940 – Roy Ayers, American singer-songwriter, keyboard player, vibraphonist, and producer (died 2025)
- 1940 – Buck Buchanan, American football player (died 1992)
- 1940 – Bob Chance, American baseball player (died 2013)
- 1941 – Stephen Jay Gould, American paleontologist, biologist, and author (died 2002)
- 1941 – Christopher Hogwood, English harpsichord player and conductor, founded the Academy of Ancient Music (died 2014)
- 1941 – Gunpei Yokoi, Japanese video game designer, invented Game Boy (died 1997)
- 1942 – Danny Hutton, Irish-American singer
- 1944 – Thomas Allen, English actor, singer, and academic
- 1945 – José Feliciano, Puerto Rican singer-songwriter and guitarist
- 1945 – Gerard Henderson, Australian journalist and author
- 1945 – Mike Mullane, American colonel and astronaut
- 1946 – Michèle Alliot-Marie, French lawyer and politician, French Minister of Foreign and European Affairs
- 1946 – Jim Hines, American sprinter and football player (died 2023)
- 1946 – Don Powell, English rock drummer
- 1946 – Patrick Norman, Canadian singer-songwriter
- 1947 – Larry Nelson, American golfer
- 1947 – David Pountney, English director and manager
- 1948 – Zhang Chengzhi, Chinese historian and author
- 1948 – Brian Donohoe, Scottish politician
- 1948 – Judy Geeson, English actress
- 1948 – Bob Lanier, American basketball player and coach (died 2022)
- 1948 – Charles Simonyi, Hungarian-American software architect, businessman, and space tourist
- 1948 – Margaret Trudeau, Canadian actress and talk show host, spouse of Pierre Trudeau, the 15th Prime Minister of Canada
- 1948 – Charlie Waters, American football player, coach, and radio host
- 1949 – Barriemore Barlow, English rock drummer and songwriter
- 1949 – Babette Cole, English author and illustrator (died 2017)
- 1949 – Don Muraco, American wrestler
- 1949 – Bill O'Reilly, American journalist and author
- 1950 – Rosie Flores, American singer and guitarist
- 1950 – Tom Lund, Norwegian football player
- 1950 – Joe Perry, American singer-songwriter and guitarist
- 1951 – Sarah Coakley, English philosopher, theologian, and academic
- 1951 – Steve Keirn, American wrestler
- 1951 – Bill Rogers, American golfer
- 1952 – Medea Benjamin, American activist, founder of Code Pink
- 1952 – Vic Toews, Paraguayan-Canadian lawyer and politician, 48th Canadian Minister of Justice
- 1953 – Pat Cadigan, American science fiction author
- 1953 – Amy Irving, American actress
- 1953 – John Thurso, Scottish businessman and politician
- 1954 – Jackie Ashley, English journalist
- 1954 – Lorely Burt, English politician
- 1954 – Clark Johnson, American-Canadian actor
- 1954 – Don Wilson, American kickboxer and actor
- 1955 – Pat Mastelotto, American rock drummer
- 1956 – Johnnie Fingers, Irish keyboard player and songwriter
- 1957 – Kate Burton, British-American actress
- 1957 – Carol Decker, English singer-songwriter
- 1958 – Chris Columbus, American director, producer, and screenwriter
- 1958 – Siobhan Fahey, Irish singer-songwriter and producer
- 1959 – Michael Earl, American actor, singer, and puppeteer (died 2015)
- 1960 – Alison Bechdel, American author and illustrator
- 1960 – Margaret Ferrier, Scottish politician
- 1960 – Colin Firth, English actor and producer
- 1960 – Tim Hunter, Canadian ice hockey player and coach
- 1960 – David Lowery, American singer-songwriter and guitarist
- 1963 – Randy Johnson, American baseball player
- 1963 – Bill Stevenson, American drummer, songwriter, and producer
- 1964 – Jack Ma, Chinese businessman, co-founder of Alibaba Group
- 1964 – John E. Sununu, American engineer and politician
- 1966 – Yuki Saito, Japanese singer and actress
- 1966 – Joe Nieuwendyk, Canadian ice hockey player and manager
- 1968 – Andreas Herzog, Austrian footballer and manager
- 1968 – Big Daddy Kane, American rapper, producer, and actor
- 1968 – Guy Ritchie, English director, producer, and screenwriter
- 1969 – Craig Innes, New Zealand rugby player
- 1969 – Johnathon Schaech, American actor, producer, and screenwriter
- 1970 – Ménélik, Cameroonian-French rapper
- 1970 – Dean Gorré, Surinamese footballer and manager
- 1970 – Paula Kelley, American singer-songwriter
- 1970 – Neera Tanden, American lawyer and policy analyst
- 1971 – Joe Bravo, American jockey
- 1972 – James Duval, American actor and producer
- 1972 – Bente Skari, Norwegian skier
- 1973 – Ferdinand Coly, Senegalese footballer
- 1973 – Mark Huizinga, Dutch martial artist
- 1973 – Tim Stimpson, English rugby player
- 1974 – Mohammad Akram, Pakistani cricketer and coach
- 1974 – Mirko Filipović, Croatian mixed martial artist, boxer, and politician
- 1974 – Ryan Phillippe, American actor and producer
- 1974 – Ben Wallace, American basketball player
- 1975 – Dan O'Toole, Canadian sportscaster
- 1975 – Melanie Pullen, American photographer
- 1976 – Marty Holah, New Zealand rugby player
- 1976 – Gustavo Kuerten, Brazilian tennis player
- 1976 – Vasilios Lakis, Greek footballer
- 1976 – Matt Morgan, American wrestler
- 1976 – Reinder Nummerdor, Dutch volleyball player
- 1977 – Mike DiBiase, American wrestler
- 1977 – Caleb Ralph, New Zealand rugby player
- 1978 – Julia Goldsworthy, English politician
- 1978 – Alex Horne, British comedian
- 1978 – Ramūnas Šiškauskas, Lithuanian basketball player
- 1979 – Jacob Young, American actor
- 1980 – Roger Mason Jr., American basketball player
- 1980 – Trevor Murdoch, American wrestler
- 1980 – Mikey Way, American bass player and songwriter
- 1980 – Tetsuya Yamagami, Japanese assassin of Shinzo Abe
- 1981 – Marco Chiudinelli, Swiss tennis player
- 1981 – Germán Denis, Argentinian footballer
- 1981 – Bonnie Maxon, American wrestler
- 1982 – Misty Copeland, American ballerina and author
- 1982 – Javi Varas, Spanish footballer
- 1983 – Shawn James, Guyanese-American basketball player
- 1983 – Jérémy Toulalan, French footballer
- 1983 – Joey Votto, Canadian baseball player
- 1984 – Sander Post, Estonian footballer
- 1984 – Harry Treadaway, English actor
- 1984 – Luke Treadaway, English actor
- 1984 – Drake Younger, American wrestler
- 1985 – Aleksandrs Čekulajevs, Latvian footballer
- 1985 – James Graham, English rugby league player
- 1985 – Neil Walker, American baseball player
- 1986 – Angel McCoughtry, American basketball player
- 1986 – Ashley Monroe, American singer-songwriter
- 1986 – Eoin Morgan, Irish- English cricketer
- 1987 – Paul Goldschmidt, American baseball player
- 1987 – Alex Saxon, American actor
- 1988 – Bobby Sharp, Canadian wrestler
- 1988 – Jordan Staal, Canadian ice hockey player
- 1988 – Jared Lee Loughner, American mass murderer
- 1989 – Manish Pandey, Indian cricketer
- 1989 – Matt Ritchie, English footballer
- 1990 – Corban Knight, Canadian ice hockey player
- 1991 – Sam Morsy, Egyptian footballer
- 1992 – Ricky Ledo, American basketball player
- 1992 – Ayub Masika, Kenyan footballer
- 1993 – Sam Kerr, Australian footballer
- 1995 – Jack Grealish, English footballer
- 1995 – Matt Rife, American comedian and actor
- 1997 – Brooke Henderson, Canadian golfer
- 1997 – Troy Terry, American ice hockey player
- 1998 – Anna Blinkova, Russian tennis player
- 1998 – Sheck Wes, American rapper
- 1999 – Laura Taylor, Australian swimmer
- 1999 – jschlatt, American YouTuber and singer
- 2001 – Armando Broja, Albanian-born English footballer
- 2001 – Nick Cross, American football player
- 2004 – Gabriel Bateman, American actor

== Deaths ==
=== Pre-1600 ===
- 210 BC – Qin Shi Huang, first emperor of China (born 259 BC)
- 602 – Dugu Qieluo, empress of the Chinese Sui dynasty (born 544)
- 689 – Guo Zhengyi, official of the Chinese Tang dynasty
- 710 – Li Chongfu, imperial prince of the Chinese Tang dynasty (born c. 680)
- 918 – Baldwin II, Frankish margrave (born c. 865)
- 952 – Gao Xingzhou, Chinese general (born 885)
- 954 – Louis IV, king of West Francia (born 920)
- 1167 – Matilda of England, Holy Roman Empress (born 1102)
- 1197 – Henry II, Count of Champagne (born 1166)
- 1217 – William de Redvers, 5th Earl of Devon, English politician
- 1281 – John II, Margrave of Brandenburg-Stendal (born 1237)
- 1306 – Nicholas of Tolentino, Italian mystic and saint (born 1245)
- 1308 – Emperor Go-Nijō of Japan (born 1285)
- 1364 – Robert of Taranto, King of Albania
- 1382 – Louis I of Hungary (born 1326)
- 1384 – Joanna of Dreux, Countess of Penthievre and Duchess of Brittany (born 1319)
- 1419 – John the Fearless, Duke of Burgundy (born 1371)
- 1479 – Jacopo Piccolomini-Ammannati, Italian cardinal and humanist (born 1422)
- 1482 – Federico da Montefeltro, Italian warlord (born 1422)
- 1504 – Philibert II, Duke of Savoy (born 1480)
- 1519 – John Colet, English theologian and scholar (born 1467)
- 1549 – Anthony Denny, English politician (born 1501)
- 1591 – Richard Grenville, English admiral and politician (born 1542)

=== 1601–1900 ===
- 1604 – William Morgan, Welsh bishop and translator (born 1545)
- 1607 – Luzzasco Luzzaschi, Italian organist and composer (born 1545)
- 1669 – Henrietta Maria of France, Queen Consort of England, Scotland and Ireland (born 1609)
- 1676 – Gerrard Winstanley, English activist (born 1609)
- 1748 – Ignacia del Espíritu Santo, Filipino nun, founded the Religious of the Virgin Mary (born 1663)
- 1749 – Émilie du Châtelet, French mathematician and physicist (born 1706)
- 1759 – Ferdinand Konščak, Croatian missionary and explorer (born 1703)
- 1797 – Mary Wollstonecraft, English philosopher, historian, and novelist (born 1759)
- 1842 – William Hobson, Irish-New Zealand soldier and politician, 1st Governor of New Zealand (born 1792)
- 1842 – Letitia Christian Tyler, American wife of John Tyler, 11th First Lady of the United States (born 1790)
- 1845 – Joseph Story, American lawyer, politician, and Associate Justice of the Supreme Court of the United States (born 1779)
- 1851 – Thomas Hopkins Gallaudet, American minister and educator (born 1787)
- 1867 – Simon Sechter, Austrian organist, composer, and conductor (born 1788)
- 1889 – Charles III, Prince of Monaco (born 1818)
- 1891 – David Humphreys Storer, American physician and naturalist (born 1804)
- 1898 – Empress Elisabeth of Austria (born 1837)

=== 1901–present ===
- 1905 – Pete Browning, American baseball player (born 1861)
- 1915 – Charles Boucher de Boucherville, Canadian physician and politician, 3rd Premier of Quebec (born 1822)
- 1915 – Bagha Jatin, Indian philosopher and author (born 1879)
- 1919 – J. F. Archibald, Australian journalist and publisher, founded the Archibald Prize (born 1856)
- 1922 – Wilfrid Scawen Blunt, English poet and activist (born 1840)
- 1923 – Sukumar Ray, Indian poet and playwright (born 1887)
- 1931 – Dmitri Egorov, Russian mathematician and academic (born 1869)
- 1931 – Salvatore Maranzano, Italian-American gangster (born 1886)
- 1933 – Giuseppe Campari, Italian race car driver (born 1892)
- 1933 – Baconin Borzacchini, Italian race car driver (born 1898)
- 1933 – Stanisław Czaykowski, Polish race car driver (born 1899)
- 1934 – George Henschel, German-English pianist, composer, and conductor (born 1850)
- 1935 – Huey Long, American lawyer and politician, 40th Governor of Louisiana (born 1893) - See Assassination of Huey Long
- 1937 – Sergei Tretyakov, Russian author and playwright (born 1892)
- 1938 – Charles Cruft, English businessman, founded Crufts (born 1852)
- 1939 – Wilhelm Fritz von Roettig, German general (born 1888)
- 1940 – Issy Smith, British-Australian soldier and Jewish recipient of the Victoria Cross (born 1890)
- 1948 – Ferdinand I of Bulgaria (born 1861)
- 1952 – Youssef Aftimus, Lebanese engineer and architect, designed the Beirut City Hall (born 1866)
- 1954 – Peter Anders, German tenor and actor (born 1908)
- 1961 – Leo Carrillo, American actor and singer (born 1880)
- 1961 – Wolfgang von Trips, German race car driver (born 1928)
- 1965 – Father Divine, American spiritual leader (born 1880)
- 1966 – Emil Julius Gumbel, German mathematician and statistician (born 1891)
- 1968 – Erna Mohr, German zoologist (born 1894)
- 1971 – Pier Angeli, Italian-American actress and singer (born 1932)
- 1973 – Cornelia Meigs, American author and playwright (born 1884)
- 1975 – Hans Swarowsky, Hungarian-Austrian conductor and educator (born 1899)
- 1975 – George Paget Thomson, English physicist and academic, Nobel Prize laureate (born 1892)
- 1976 – Dalton Trumbo, American screenwriter and novelist (born 1905)
- 1979 – Agostinho Neto, Angolan politician, 1st President of Angola (born 1922)
- 1983 – Felix Bloch, Swiss-American physicist and academic, Nobel Prize laureate (born 1905)
- 1983 – Norah Lofts, English author (born 1904)
- 1983 – Jon Brower Minnoch, American heaviest man (born 1941)
- 1983 – B. J. Vorster, South African lawyer and politician, 4th State President of South Africa (born 1915)
- 1985 – Ernst Öpik, Estonian astronomer and astrophysicist (born 1893)
- 1985 – Jock Stein, Scottish footballer and manager (born 1922)
- 1987 – Boris Rõtov, Estonian chess player (born 1937)
- 1988 – Virginia Satir, American psychotherapist and author (born 1916)
- 1991 – Jack Crawford, Australian tennis player (born 1908)
- 1994 – Charles Drake, American actor (born 1917)
- 1996 – Joanne Dru, American actress (born 1922)
- 1996 – Hans List, Austrian scientist and inventor (born 1896)
- 2000 – Zaib-un-Nissa Hamidullah, Indian-Pakistani journalist and author (born 1921)
- 2004 – Brock Adams, American soldier, lawyer, and politician, 5th United States Secretary of Transportation (born 1927)
- 2005 – Hermann Bondi, Austrian mathematician and cosmologist (born 1919)
- 2005 – Clarence "Gatemouth" Brown, American singer and guitarist (born 1924)
- 2006 – Patty Berg, American golfer (born 1918)
- 2006 – Tāufaʻāhau Tupou IV, Tongan king (born 1918)
- 2007 – Anita Roddick, English businesswoman, founded The Body Shop (born 1942)
- 2007 – Joe Sherlock, Irish politician (born 1930)
- 2007 – Ted Stepien, American businessman (born 1925)
- 2007 – Jane Wyman, American actress (born 1917)
- 2008 – Gérald Beaudoin, Canadian lawyer and politician (born 1929)
- 2008 – Vernon Handley, English conductor (born 1930)
- 2011 – Cliff Robertson, American actor (born 1923)
- 2012 – Raquel Correa, Chilean journalist (born 1934)
- 2012 – Robert Gammage, American captain, lawyer, and politician (born 1938)
- 2012 – Lance LeGault, American actor and stuntman (born 1935)
- 2012 – Stanley Long, English director, producer, cinematographer, and screenwriter (born 1933)
- 2012 – John Moffatt, English actor and playwright (born 1922)
- 2013 – John Hambrick, American journalist and actor (born 1940)
- 2013 – Ibrahim Makhous, Syrian politician, Syrian Minister of Foreign Affairs (born 1925)
- 2013 – Josef Němec, Czech boxer (born 1933)
- 2013 – Clay Shaw, American accountant and politician (born 1939)
- 2013 – Jack Vance, Canadian general (born 1933)
- 2014 – Emilio Botín, Spanish banker and businessman (born 1934)
- 2014 – Richard Kiel, American actor (born 1939)
- 2014 – Edward Nelson, American mathematician and academic (born 1932)
- 2014 – George Spencer, American baseball player (born 1926)
- 2014 – Paul K. Sybrowsky, American religious leader and academic (born 1944)
- 2015 – Norman Farberow, American psychologist and academic (born 1918)
- 2015 – Adrian Frutiger, Swiss typeface designer (born 1928)
- 2015 – Antoine Lahad, Lebanese general (born 1927)
- 2020 – Diana Rigg, British actress (born 1938)
- 2023 – Ian Wilmut, British embryologist (born 1944)
- 2024 – Frankie Beverly, American soul/funk singer-songwriter, musician, and producer (born 1946)
- 2024 – Jim Sasser, American lawyer and politician, 6th United States Ambassador to China (born 1936)
- 2025 – Charlie Kirk, American right-wing political activist (born 1993)

== Holidays and observances ==
- Amerindian Heritage Day (Guyana)
- Children's Day (Honduras)
- Christian feast day:
  - Alexander Crummell (Episcopal Church)
  - Ambrose Barlow
  - Aubert
  - Blessed Sebastian Kimura, Charles Spinola, and Martyrs of Nagasaki
  - Edmund James Peck (Anglican Church of Canada)
  - Nicholas of Tolentino
  - Theodard of Maastricht
  - September 10 (Eastern Orthodox liturgics)
- Gibraltar National Day
- Saint George's Caye Day (Belize)
- Teachers' Day (China)
- World Suicide Prevention Day
