= January 16 =

January 16 this year in various calendars
- Friday, 16 January 2026
Akan	Monofie
Armenian	30 Arach 1475
Aztec	Toxcatl 6, 7 Ocēlōtl
Babylonian	26 Kislimu, 2336 SE
Balinese pawukon	Luang, Pepet, Kajeng, Laba, Pon, Maulu, Sukra of Tambir, Indra, Gigis, Duka
Bengali	2 Magh, BS 1432
Chinese	Yang Metal Tiger・Ox Mansion; Wood Snake Year, Month 11, Day 28 (Xiaohan, 4 days until Dahan)
Common Era	16 January 2026 CE
Coptic	8 Tobi, AM 1742
Egyptian	5 Payni, 2774 NE
Ethiopian	8 Ṭer, 2018 Amätä Məhrät
French Republican	Décade III, Septidi de Nivôse de l'Année 234 de la République
Gregorian	16 January, AD 2026
Hebrew	27 Tevet, AM 5786
Hindu	Mūla・Dhruva; Solar: 3 Māgha, 1947 SE; Lunisolar: Trayodaśī, Kṛishna pakṣa of Pauṣa, 2082 VE; Siddhārthin・5126 KY・1,872,591
Icelandic	Föstudagur, 24 Mörsugur 2025
Islamic	27 Rajab, AH 1447 (using tabular method)
ISO week date	2026-W03-5
Japanese	28 Shimotsuki, Reiwa 8 (Shōkan, 4 days until Daikan)
Julian	3 January, AD 2026 (AM 7534)
Julian day	2461057
Korean	28 Jwidal, 4358 DE
Maya	13.0.13.4.14; 12 Muan, 7 Ix
Roman	ante diem III Nonas Ianuarias, MMDCCLXXIX AUC
Solar Hijri	26 Dey, SH 1404
Tibetan	28 mgo, shing mo sbrul 2152 or 1771 or 999

<<	January					>>
Su	Mo	Tu	We	Th	Fr	Sa
				1	2	3
4	5	6	7	8	9	10
11	12	13	14	15	16	17
18	19	20	21	22	23	24
25	26	27	28	29	30	31
2026

January 16 in recent years
2026 (Friday)
2025 (Thursday)
2024 (Tuesday)
2023 (Monday)
2022 (Sunday)
2021 (Saturday)
2020 (Thursday)
2019 (Wednesday)
2018 (Tuesday)
2017 (Monday)

January 16 is the 16th day of the year in the Gregorian calendar; 349 days remain until the end of the year (350 in leap years).

== Events ==
=== Pre-1600 ===
- 1458 BC – Hatshepsut dies at the age of 50 and is buried in the Valley of the Kings.
- 27 BC – Gaius Julius Caesar Octavianus is granted the title Augustus by the Roman Senate, marking the beginning of the Roman Empire.
- 378 – General Siyaj K'ak' conquers Tikal, enlarging the domain of King Spearthrower Owl of Teotihuacán.
- 550 – The Ostrogoths, under King Totila, conquer Rome after a long siege, by bribing the Isaurian garrison.
- 929 – Emir Abd-ar-Rahman III establishes the Caliphate of Córdoba.
- 1120 – Crusades: The Council of Nablus is held, establishing the earliest surviving written laws of the Crusader Kingdom of Jerusalem.
- 1275 – Edward I permits his mother Eleanor of Provence to expel the Jews from the towns Worcester, Marlborough, Cambridge and Gloucester.
- 1349 – Basel Massacre: Dozens to hundreds of Jews were burned to death by Christians after being accused of causing the Black Death.
- 1362 – Saint Marcellus's flood kills at least 25,000 people on the shores of the North Sea.
- 1537 – Bigod's Rebellion, an armed insurrection attempting to resist the English Reformation, begins.
- 1547 – Grand Prince Ivan IV is crowned as Tsar of all Russia.
- 1556 – Philip II becomes King of Spain.
- 1572 – Thomas Howard, 4th Duke of Norfolk is tried and found guilty of treason for his part in the Ridolfi plot to restore Catholicism in England.

=== 1601–1900 ===
- 1605 – The first edition of El ingenioso hidalgo Don Quijote de la Mancha (Book One of Don Quixote) by Miguel de Cervantes is published in Madrid, Spain.
- 1641 – Reapers' War: The Junta de Braços (parliamentary assembly) of the Principality of Catalonia accepts the proposal of establishment of the Catalan Republic, under French protection.
- 1707 – The Scottish Parliament ratifies the Act of Union, paving the way for the creation of Great Britain.
- 1716 – King Philip V of Spain promulgates the Nueva Planta decree of the Principality of Catalonia, abolishing the Catalan institutions and its legal system, being replaced by those of Castile, thus putting an end to Catalonia as separate state and becoming a province of the new French-style Kingdom of Spain.
- 1757 – Forces of the Maratha Empire are defeated by the Durrani Empire in the Battle of Narela.
- 1780 – American Revolutionary War: Battle of Cape St. Vincent.
- 1786 – Virginia enacts the Statute for Religious Freedom authored by Thomas Jefferson.
- 1809 – Peninsular War: The British defeat the French at the Battle of La Coruña.
- 1847 – Westward expansion of the United States: John C. Frémont is appointed Governor of the new California Territory.
- 1862 – Hartley Colliery disaster: Two hundred and four men and boys killed in a mining disaster, prompting a change in UK law which henceforth required all collieries to have at least two independent means of escape.
- 1878 – Russo-Turkish War (1877–78): Battle of Philippopolis: Captain Aleksandr Burago with a squadron of Russian Imperial army dragoons liberates Plovdiv from Ottoman rule.
- 1883 – The Pendleton Civil Service Reform Act, establishing the United States Civil Service, is enacted by Congress.
- 1900 – The United States Senate accepts the Anglo-German treaty of 1899 in which the United Kingdom renounces its claims to the Samoan islands.

=== 1901–present ===
- 1909 – Ernest Shackleton's expedition finds the magnetic South Pole.
- 1913 – Indian mathematician Srinivasa Ramanujan writes his first letter to G. H. Hardy at Cambridge, stating without proof various formulae involving integrals, infinite series, and continued fractions, beginning a long correspondence between the two as well as widespread recognition of Ramanujan's results.
- 1919 – Nebraska becomes the 36th state to approve the Eighteenth Amendment to the United States Constitution. With the necessary three-quarters of the states approving the amendment, Prohibition is constitutionally mandated in the United States one year later.
- 1920 – The League of Nations holds its first council meeting in Paris, France.
- 1921 – The Marxist Left in Slovakia and the Transcarpathian Ukraine holds its founding congress in Ľubochňa.
- 1942 – The Holocaust: Nazi Germany begins deporting Jews from the Łódź Ghetto to Chełmno extermination camp.
- 1942 – Crash of TWA Flight 3, killing all 22 aboard, including film star Carole Lombard.
- 1945 – World War II: Adolf Hitler moves into his underground bunker, the so-called Führerbunker.
- 1959 – Austral Líneas Aéreas Flight 205 crashes into the Atlantic Ocean near Astor Piazzolla International Airport in Mar del Plata, Argentina, killing 51.
- 1969 – Czech student Jan Palach commits suicide by self-immolation in Prague, Czechoslovakia, in protest against the Soviets' crushing of the Prague Spring the year before.
- 1969 – Space Race: Soviet spacecraft Soyuz 4 and Soyuz 5 perform the first-ever docking of crewed spacecraft in orbit, the first-ever transfer of crew from one space vehicle to another, and the only time such a transfer was accomplished with a space walk.
- 1979 – Iranian Revolution: The last Iranian Shah flees Iran with his family for good and relocates to Egypt.
- 1983 – Turkish Airlines Flight 158 crashes at Ankara Esenboğa Airport in Ankara, Turkey, killing 47 and injuring 20.
- 1984 – A radiation detector at Los Alamos National Laboratory in New Mexico, United States, detects radioactivity after a truck carrying rebar accidentally passed through the laboratory's area, revealing a contamination incident that occurred in Ciudad Juárez, Mexico, the previous month.
- 1991 – Coalition Forces go to war with Iraq, beginning the Gulf War.
- 1992 – El Salvador officials and rebel leaders sign the Chapultepec Peace Accords in Mexico City, Mexico ending the 12-year Salvadoran Civil War that claimed at least 75,000 lives.
- 1995 – An avalanche hits the Icelandic village Súðavík, destroying 25 homes and burying 26 people, 14 of whom died.
- 1998 – In Santa Lucía Cotzumalguapa, Guatemala, thirteen American students on a school trip are attacked and robbed at gunpoint; five were raped.
- 2001 – Second Congo War: Congolese President Laurent-Désiré Kabila is assassinated by one of his own bodyguards in Kinshasa.
- 2001 – US President Bill Clinton awards former President Theodore Roosevelt a posthumous Medal of Honor for his service in the Spanish–American War.
- 2002 – War in Afghanistan: The UN Security Council unanimously establishes an arms embargo and the freezing of assets of Osama bin Laden, al-Qaeda, and the remaining members of the Taliban.
- 2003 – The Space Shuttle Columbia takes off for mission STS-107 which would be its final one. Columbia disintegrated 16 days later on re-entry.
- 2006 – Ellen Johnson Sirleaf is sworn in as Liberia's new president. She becomes Africa's first female elected head of state.
- 2011 – Syrian civil war: The Movement for a Democratic Society (TEV-DEM) is established with the stated goal of re-organizing Syria along the lines of democratic confederalism.
- 2012 – The Mali War begins when Tuareg militias start fighting the Malian government for independence.
- 2016 – Thirty-three out of 126 freed hostages are injured and 23 killed in terrorist attacks in Ouagadougou, Burkina Faso on a hotel and a nearby restaurant.
- 2017 – Turkish Airlines Flight 6491 crashes into a residential area near Manas International Airport in Kyrgyzstan, killing 39 people.
- 2018 – Myanmar police open fire on a group of ethnic Rakhine protesters, killing seven and wounding twelve.
- 2020 – The first impeachment of Donald Trump formally moves into its trial phase in the United States Senate.
- 2020 – The United States Senate ratifies the United States–Mexico–Canada Agreement as a replacement for NAFTA.

== Births ==
=== Pre-1600 ===
- 972 – Sheng Zong, emperor of the Liao Dynasty (died 1031)
- 1093 – Isaac Komnenos, son of Byzantine emperor Alexios I Komnenos (died 1152)
- 1245 – Edmund Crouchback, English politician, Lord Warden of the Cinque Ports (died 1296)
- 1362 – Robert de Vere, duke of Ireland (died 1392)
- 1409 – René of Anjou, king of Naples (died 1480)
- 1477 – Johannes Schöner, German astronomer and cartographer (died 1547)
- 1501 – Anthony Denny, confidant of Henry VIII of England (died 1559)
- 1516 – Bayinnaung, king of Burma (died 1581)
- 1558 – Jakobea of Baden, Margravine of Baden by birth, Duchess of Jülich-Cleves-Berg by marriage (died 1597)

=== 1601–1900 ===
- 1616 – François de Vendôme, duke of Beaufort (died 1669)
- 1626 – Lucas Achtschellinck, Belgian painter and educator (died 1699)
- 1630 – Guru Har Rai, Sikh Guru (died 1661)
- 1634 – Dorothe Engelbretsdatter, Norwegian author and poet (died 1716)
- 1653 – Johann Conrad Brunner, Swiss anatomist (died 1727)
- 1675 – Louis de Rouvroy, duc de Saint-Simon, French soldier and diplomat (died 1755)
- 1691 – Peter Scheemakers, Belgian sculptor and educator (died 1781)
- 1728 – Niccolò Piccinni, Italian composer and educator (died 1800)
- 1749 – Vittorio Alfieri, Italian poet and playwright (died 1803)
- 1757 – Richard Goodwin Keats, English admiral and politician, third Commodore-Governor of Newfoundland (died 1834)
- 1807 – Charles Henry Davis, American admiral (died 1877)
- 1815 – Henry Halleck, American lawyer, general, and scholar (died 1872)
- 1821 – John C. Breckinridge, American general and politician, 14th Vice President of the United States (died 1875)
- 1834 – Robert R. Hitt, American lawyer and politician, 13th United States Assistant Secretary of State (died 1906)
- 1836 – Francis II of the Two Sicilies (died 1894)
- 1838 – Franz Brentano, German philosopher and psychologist (died 1917)
- 1844 – Ismail Kemal, Albanian politician and statesman, first prime minister of Albania (died 1919)
- 1851 – William Hall-Jones, English-New Zealand politician, 16th Prime Minister of New Zealand (died 1936)
- 1853 – Johnston Forbes-Robertson, English actor and manager (died 1937)
- 1853 – Ian Standish Monteith Hamilton, Greek-English general (died 1947)
- 1853 – André Michelin, French businessman, co-founded the Michelin Tyre Company (died 1931)
- 1870 – Jüri Jaakson, Estonian businessman and politician, State Elder of Estonia (died 1942)
- 1872 – Henri Büsser, French organist, composer, and conductor (died 1973)
- 1874 – Robert W. Service, English-Canadian poet and author (died 1958)
- 1875 – Leonor Michaelis, German biochemist and physician (died 1949)
- 1876 – Claude Buckenham, English cricketer and footballer (died 1937)
- 1878 – Harry Carey, American actor, director, producer, and screenwriter (died 1947)
- 1880 – Samuel Jones, American high jumper (died 1954)
- 1882 – Margaret Wilson, American author (died 1973)
- 1885 – Zhou Zuoren, Chinese author and translator (died 1967)
- 1888 – Osip Brik, Russian avant garde writer and literary critic (died 1945)
- 1892 – Homer Burton Adkins, American chemist (died 1949)
- 1893 – Daisy Kennedy, Australian-English violinist (died 1981)
- 1894 – Irving Mills, American publisher (died 1985)
- 1895 – Evripidis Bakirtzis, Greek soldier and politician (died 1947)
- 1895 – T. M. Sabaratnam, Sri Lankan lawyer and politician (died 1966)
- 1895 – Nat Schachner, American lawyer, chemist, and author (died 1955)
- 1897 – Carlos Pellicer, Mexican poet and academic (died 1977)
- 1898 – Margaret Booth, American producer and editor (died 2002)
- 1898 – Irving Rapper, American film director and producer (died 1999)
- 1900 – Kiku Amino, Japanese author and translator (died 1978)
- 1900 – Edith Frank, German-Dutch mother of Anne Frank (died 1945)

=== 1901–present ===
- 1901 – Fulgencio Batista, Cuban colonel and politician, ninth President of Cuba (died 1973)
- 1901 – Frank Zamboni, American businessman and inventor (died 1988)
- 1902 – Eric Liddell, Scottish runner, rugby player, and missionary (died 1945)
- 1903 – William Grover-Williams, English-French racing driver (died 1945)
- 1905 – Ernesto Halffter, Spanish composer and conductor (died 1989)
- 1906 – Johannes Brenner, Estonian footballer and pilot (died 1975)
- 1906 – Diana Wynyard, English actress (died 1964)
- 1907 – Alexander Knox, Canadian-English actor and screenwriter (died 1995)
- 1907 – Paul Nitze, American banker and politician, tenth United States Secretary of the Navy (died 2004)
- 1908 – Sammy Crooks, English footballer (died 1981)
- 1908 – Ethel Merman, American actress and singer (died 1984)
- 1908 – Günther Prien, German captain (died 1941)
- 1909 – Clement Greenberg, American art critic (died 1994)
- 1910 – Dizzy Dean, American baseball player and sportscaster (died 1974)
- 1911 – Ivan Barrow, Jamaican cricketer (died 1979)
- 1911 – Eduardo Frei Montalva, Chilean lawyer and politician, 28th President of Chile (died 1982)
- 1911 – Roger Lapébie, French cyclist (died 1996)
- 1914 – Roger Wagner, French-American conductor and educator (died 1992)
- 1915 – Leslie H. Martinson, American director, producer, and screenwriter (died 2016)
- 1916 – Philip Lucock, English-Australian minister and politician (died 1996)
- 1917 – Carl Karcher, American businessman, founded Carl's Jr. (died 2008)
- 1918 – Nel Benschop, Dutch poet and educator (died 2005)
- 1918 – Allan Ekelund, Swedish director, producer, and production manager (died 2009)
- 1918 – Clem Jones, Australian surveyor and politician, eighth Lord Mayor of Brisbane (died 2007)
- 1918 – Stirling Silliphant, American screenwriter and producer (died 1996)
- 1919 – Jerome Horwitz, American chemist and academic (died 2012)
- 1920 – Elliott Reid, American actor and screenwriter (died 2013)
- 1921 – Francesco Scavullo, American photographer (died 2004)
- 1923 – Gene Feist, American director and playwright, co-founded the Roundabout Theatre Company (died 2014)
- 1923 – Anthony Hecht, American poet (died 2004)
- 1924 – Katy Jurado, Mexican actress (died 2002)
- 1924 – Allen Swift, American actor, writer, playwright, and magician (died 2010)
- 1925 – Peter Hirsch, German-English metallurgist and academic (died 2025)
- 1925 – James Robinson Risner, American general and pilot (died 2013)
- 1928 – William Kennedy, American novelist and journalist
- 1928 – Pilar Lorengar, Spanish soprano and actress (died 1996)
- 1929 – Stanley Jeyaraja Tambiah, Sri Lankan anthropologist and academic (died 2014)
- 1930 – Mary Ann McMorrow, American lawyer and judge (died 2013)
- 1930 – Norman Podhoretz, American journalist and author (died 2025)
- 1930 – Paula Tilbrook, English actress (died 2019)
- 1931 – John Enderby, English physicist and academic (died 2021)
- 1931 – Robert L. Park, American physicist and academic (died 2020)
- 1931 – Johannes Rau, German journalist and politician, eighth Federal President of Germany (died 2006)
- 1932 – Victor Ciocâltea, Romanian chess player (died 1983)
- 1932 – Dian Fossey, American zoologist and anthropologist (died 1985)
- 1933 – Susan Sontag, American novelist, essayist, and critic (died 2004)
- 1934 – Bob Bogle, American rock guitarist and bass player (died 2009)
- 1934 – Marilyn Horne, American soprano and actress
- 1935 – A. J. Foyt, American race car driver
- 1935 – Udo Lattek, German footballer, manager, and sportscaster (died 2015)
- 1936 – Michael White, Scottish actor and producer (died 2016)
- 1937 – Luiz Bueno, Brazilian racing driver (died 2011)
- 1937 – Francis George, American cardinal (died 2015)
- 1938 – Marina Vaizey, American journalist and critic
- 1939 – Ralph Gibson, American photographer
- 1941 – Claire Gordon, English actress and comedian (died 2015)
- 1941 – Christine Truman, English tennis player and sportscaster
- 1941 – Hyun Ki-young, South Korean writer
- 1942 – René Angélil, Canadian singer and manager (died 2016)
- 1942 – Barbara Lynn, American singer-songwriter and guitarist
- 1943 – Michael Attwell, English actor (died 2006)
- 1943 – Gavin Bryars, English bassist and composer
- 1943 – Brian Ferneyhough, British composer
- 1943 – Ronnie Milsap, American singer and pianist
- 1944 – Dieter Moebius, Swiss-German keyboard player and producer (died 2015)
- 1944 – Jim Stafford, American singer-songwriter and actor
- 1944 – Jill Tarter, American astronomer and biologist
- 1944 – Judy Baar Topinka, American journalist and politician (died 2014)
- 1945 – Wim Suurbier, Dutch footballer and manager (died 2020)
- 1946 – Kabir Bedi, Indian actor
- 1946 – Katia Ricciarelli, Italian soprano and actress
- 1947 – Elaine Murphy, Baroness Murphy, English academic and politician
- 1947 – Harvey Proctor, English politician
- 1947 – Laura Schlessinger, American physiologist, talk show host, and author
- 1948 – John Carpenter, American director, producer, screenwriter, and composer
- 1948 – Ants Laaneots, Estonian general
- 1948 – Ruth Reichl, American journalist and critic
- 1948 – Cliff Thorburn, Canadian snooker player
- 1949 – Anne F. Beiler, American businesswoman, founded Auntie Anne's
- 1949 – R. F. Foster, Irish historian and academic
- 1949 – Andrew Refshauge, Australian physician and politician, 13th Deputy Premier of New South Wales
- 1950 – Debbie Allen, American actress, dancer, and choreographer
- 1950 – Robert Schimmel, American comedian, actor, and producer (died 2010)
- 1952 – Fuad II, King of Egypt
- 1952 – Piercarlo Ghinzani, Italian racing driver and manager
- 1953 – Robert Jay Mathews, American militant, founded The Order (died 1984)
- 1954 – Robin Davies, Welsh actor (died 2010)
- 1954 – Wolfgang Schmidt, German discus thrower
- 1954 – Vasili Zhupikov, Russian footballer and coach (died 2015)
- 1955 – Jerry M. Linenger, American captain, physician, and astronaut
- 1956 – Wayne Daniel, Barbadian cricketer
- 1956 – Gerald Henderson, American basketball player
- 1956 – Martin Jol, Dutch footballer and manager
- 1956 – Greedy Smith, Australian singer-songwriter and keyboardist (died 2019)
- 1957 – Jurijs Andrejevs, Latvian footballer and manager
- 1957 – Ricardo Darín, Argentinian actor, director, and screenwriter
- 1958 – Anatoli Boukreev, Russian mountaineer and explorer (died 1997)
- 1958 – Lena Ek, Swedish lawyer and politician, ninth Swedish Minister for the Environment
- 1958 – Andris Šķēle, Latvian businessman and politician, fourth Prime Minister of Latvia
- 1959 – Lisa Milroy, Canadian painter and educator
- 1959 – Sade, Nigerian-English singer-songwriter and producer
- 1961 – Kenneth Sivertsen, Norwegian guitarist and composer (died 2006)
- 1962 – Joel Fitzgibbon, Australian electrician and politician, 51st Australian Minister of Defence
- 1962 – Maxine Jones, American R&B singer–songwriter and actress
- 1963 – James May, English journalist and television presenter
- 1964 – Gail Graham, Canadian golfer
- 1966 – Jack McDowell, American baseball player
- 1968 – David Chokachi, American actor
- 1968 – Rebecca Stead, American author
- 1969 – Marinus Bester, German footballer
- 1969 – Stevie Jackson, Scottish guitarist and songwriter
- 1969 – Roy Jones Jr., American boxer
- 1970 – Don MacLean, American basketball player and sportscaster
- 1971 – Sergi Bruguera, Spanish tennis player and coach
- 1971 – Josh Evans, American film producer, screenwriter and actor
- 1971 – Jonathan Mangum, American actor
- 1972 – Ruben Bagger, Danish footballer
- 1972 – Ang Christou, Australian footballer
- 1972 – Yuri Alekseevich Drozdov, Russian footballer and manager
- 1972 – Ezra Hendrickson, Vincentian footballer and manager
- 1972 – Joe Horn, American football player and coach
- 1972 – Richard T. Jones, American actor
- 1973 – Josie Davis, American actress
- 1974 – Kate Moss, English model and fashion designer
- 1975 – Marc Jackson, American basketball player and sportscaster
- 1976 – Viktor Maslov, Russian racing driver
- 1976 – Martina Moravcová, Slovak swimmer
- 1977 – Jeff Foster, American basketball player
- 1978 – Alfredo Amézaga, Mexican baseball player
- 1979 – Aaliyah, American singer and actress (died 2001)
- 1979 – Brenden Morrow, Canadian ice hockey player
- 1979 – Jason Ward, Canadian ice hockey player
- 1980 – Lin-Manuel Miranda, American actor, playwright, and composer
- 1980 – Albert Pujols, Dominican-American baseball player
- 1980 – Seydou Keita, Malian footballer
- 1981 – Jamie Lundmark, Canadian ice hockey player
- 1981 – Paul Rofe, Australian cricketer
- 1981 – Nick Valensi, American musician and songwriter
- 1981 – Bobby Zamora, English footballer
- 1982 – Preston, English singer-songwriter
- 1982 – Birgitte Hjort Sørensen, Danish actress
- 1982 – Tuncay, Turkish footballer
- 1983 – Emanuel Pogatetz, Austrian footballer
- 1983 – Andriy Rusol, Ukrainian footballer
- 1984 – Stephan Lichtsteiner, Swiss footballer
- 1984 – Miroslav Radović, Serbian footballer
- 1985 – Joe Flacco, American football player
- 1985 – Jayde Herrick, Australian cricketer
- 1985 – Gintaras Januševičius, Russian-Lithuanian pianist
- 1985 – Sidharth Malhotra, Indian actor
- 1985 – Jonathan Richter, Danish-Gambian footballer
- 1985 – Simon Richter, Danish-Gambian footballer
- 1985 – Renée Felice Smith, American actress
- 1986 – Johannes Rahn, German footballer
- 1986 – Mark Trumbo, American baseball player
- 1986 – Reto Ziegler, Swiss footballer
- 1987 – Jake Epstein, Canadian actor
- 1987 – Charlotte Henshaw, English swimmer
- 1987 – Greivis Vásquez, Venezuelan basketball player
- 1988 – Nicklas Bendtner, Danish footballer
- 1988 – Jorge Torres Nilo, Mexican footballer
- 1988 – FKA Twigs, English singer-songwriter and actress
- 1990 – Dennis Kelly, American football player
- 1991 – Matt Duchene, Canadian ice hockey player
- 1992 – Jason Zucker, American ice hockey player
- 1993 – Hannes Anier, Estonian footballer
- 1993 – Amandine Hesse, French tennis player
- 1993 – Sungjin, South Korean musician
- 1994 – Mikko Lehtonen, Finnish ice hockey player
- 1995 – Jonathan Allen, American football player
- 1995 – Mikaela Turik, Australian-Canadian cricketer
- 1995 – Tre'Davious White, American football player
- 1996 – Jennie, South Korean singer
- 1996 – Zhou Qi, Chinese basketball player
- 1998 – Boo Seung-kwan, South Korean singer
- 2000 – Andrew Nembhard, Canadian basketball player

== Deaths ==
=== Pre-1600 ===
- 654 – Gao Jifu, Chinese politician and chancellor (born 596)
- 957 – Abu Bakr Muhammad ibn Ali al-Madhara'i, Tulunid vizier (born 871)
- 970 – Polyeuctus of Constantinople, Byzantine patriarch (born 956)
- 1263 – Shinran Shonin, Japanese founder of the Jodo Shinshu branch of Pure Land Buddhism (born 1173)
- 1289 – Buqa, Mongol minister
- 1327 – Nikephoros Choumnos, Byzantine monk, scholar, and politician (born 1250)
- 1354 – Joanna of Châtillon, duchess of Athens (born c.1285)
- 1373 – Humphrey de Bohun, 7th Earl of Hereford (born 1342)
- 1391 – Muhammad V of Granada, Nasrid emir (born 1338)
- 1400 – John Holland, 1st Duke of Exeter, English politician, Lord Great Chamberlain (born 1352)
- 1443 – Erasmo of Narni, Italian mercenary (born 1370)
- 1545 – George Spalatin, German priest and reformer (born 1484)
- 1547 – Johannes Schöner, German astronomer and cartographer (born 1477)
- 1554 – Christiern Pedersen, Danish publisher and scholar (born 1480)
- 1585 – Edward Clinton, 1st Earl of Lincoln, English admiral and politician (born 1512)
- 1595 – Murad III, Ottoman sultan (born 1546)

=== 1601–1900 ===
- 1635 – Mariana de Jesús Torres, Spanish nun and mystic (born 1563)
- 1659 – Charles Annibal Fabrot, French lawyer (born 1580)
- 1710 – Higashiyama, Japanese emperor (born 1675)
- 1711 – Joseph Vaz, Indian-Sri Lankan priest and saint (born 1651)
- 1747 – Barthold Heinrich Brockes, German poet and playwright (born 1680)
- 1748 – Arnold Drakenborch, Dutch lawyer and scholar (born 1684)
- 1750 – Ivan Trubetskoy, Russian field marshal and politician (born 1667)
- 1752 – Francis Blomefield, English historian and author (born 1705)
- 1794 – Edward Gibbon, English historian and politician (born 1737)
- 1809 – John Moore, Scottish general and politician (born 1761)
- 1817 – Alexander J. Dallas, Jamaican-American lawyer and politician, sixth United States Secretary of the Treasury (born 1759)
- 1834 – Jean Nicolas Pierre Hachette, French mathematician and academic (born 1769)
- 1856 – Thaddeus William Harris, American entomologist and botanist (born 1795)
- 1864 – Anton Schindler, Austrian secretary and author (born 1795)
- 1865 – Edmond François Valentin About, French journalist and author (born 1828)
- 1879 – Octave Crémazie, Canadian-French poet and bookseller (born 1827)
- 1886 – Amilcare Ponchielli, Italian composer and academic (born 1834)
- 1891 – Léo Delibes, French pianist and composer (born 1836)
- 1898 – Charles Pelham Villiers, English lawyer and politician (born 1802)

=== 1901–present ===
- 1901 – Jules Barbier, French poet and playwright (born 1825)
- 1901 – Arnold Böcklin, Swiss painter and academic (born 1827)
- 1901 – Hiram Rhodes Revels, American soldier, minister, and politician (born 1822)
- 1901 – Mahadev Govind Ranade, Indian scholar, social reformer, judge and author (born 1842)
- 1906 – Marshall Field, American businessman and philanthropist, founded Marshall Field's (born 1834)
- 1917 – George Dewey, American admiral (born 1837)
- 1919 – Rodrigues Alves, Brazilian lawyer and politician, fifth President of Brazil (born 1848)
- 1933 – Bekir Sami Kunduh, Turkish politician (born 1867)
- 1936 – Albert Fish, American serial killer, rapist and cannibal (born 1870)
- 1938 – Sarat Chandra Chattopadhyay Indian author and playwright (born 1876)
- 1942 – Prince Arthur, Duke of Connaught and Strathearn (born 1850)
- 1942 – Villem Grünthal-Ridala, Estonian poet and linguist (born 1885)
- 1942 – Carole Lombard, American actress and comedian (born 1908)
- 1942 – Ernst Scheller, German lawyer and politician, Mayor of Marburg (born 1899)
- 1957 – Alexander Cambridge, 1st Earl of Athlone, English general and politician, 16th Governor General of Canada (born 1874)
- 1957 – Arturo Toscanini, Italian cellist and conductor (born 1867)
- 1959 – Phan Khôi, Vietnamese journalist and author (born 1887)
- 1961 – Max Schöne, German swimmer (born 1880)
- 1962 – Frank Hurley, Australian photographer, director, producer, and cinematographer (born 1885)
- 1962 – Ivan Meštrović, Croatian sculptor and architect, designed the Monument to the Unknown Hero (born 1883)
- 1967 – Robert J. Van de Graaff, American physicist and academic (born 1901)
- 1968 – Bob Jones Sr., American evangelist, founded Bob Jones University (born 1883)
- 1968 – Panagiotis Poulitsas, Greek archaeologist and judge (born 1881)
- 1969 – Vernon Duke, Russian-American composer and songwriter (born 1903)
- 1971 – Philippe Thys, Belgian cyclist (born 1890)
- 1972 – Teller Ammons, American soldier and politician, 28th Governor of Colorado (born 1895)
- 1972 – Ross Bagdasarian, Sr., American singer-songwriter, pianist, producer, and actor, created Alvin and the Chipmunks (born 1919)
- 1973 – Edgar Sampson, American musician and composer (born 1907)
- 1975 – Israel Abramofsky, Russian-American painter (born 1888)
- 1978 – A. V. Kulasingham, Sri Lankan journalist, lawyer, and politician (born 1890)
- 1981 – Bernard Lee, English actor (born 1908)
- 1983 – Virginia Mauret, American musician and dancer
- 1986 – Herbert W. Armstrong, American evangelist, author, and publisher (born 1892)
- 1987 – Bertram Wainer, Australian physician and activist (born 1928)
- 1988 – Andrija Artuković, Croatian politician, war criminal, and Porajmos perpetrator, first Minister of Interior of the Independent State of Croatia (born 1899)
- 1990 – Lady Eve Balfour, British farmer, educator, and founding figure in the organic movement (born 1898)
- 1995 – Eric Mottram, English poet and critic (born 1924)
- 1996 – Marcia Davenport, American author and critic (born 1903)
- 1996 – Kaye Webb, English journalist and publisher (born 1914)
- 1999 – Jim McClelland, Australian lawyer, jurist, and politician, 12th Minister for Industry and Science (born 1915)
- 2000 – Robert R. Wilson, American physicist and academic (born 1914)
- 2001 – Auberon Waugh, English author and journalist (born 1939)
- 2002 – Robert Hanbury Brown, English astronomer and physicist (born 1916)
- 2003 – Richard Wainwright, English politician (born 1918)
- 2004 – Kalevi Sorsa, Finnish politician 34th Prime Minister of Finland (born 1930)
- 2005 – Marjorie Williams, American journalist and author (born 1958)
- 2006 – Stanley Biber, American soldier and physician (born 1923)
- 2009 – Joe Erskine, American boxer and runner (born 1930)
- 2009 – John Mortimer, English lawyer and author (born 1923)
- 2009 – Andrew Wyeth, American painter (born 1917)
- 2010 – Glen Bell, American businessman, founded Taco Bell (born 1923)
- 2010 – Takumi Shibano, Japanese author and translator (born 1926)
- 2012 – Joe Bygraves, Jamaican-English boxer (born 1931)
- 2012 – Jimmy Castor, American singer-songwriter and saxophonist (born 1940)
- 2012 – Sigursteinn Gíslason, Icelandic footballer and manager (born 1968)
- 2012 – Lorna Kesterson, American journalist and politician (born 1925)
- 2012 – Gustav Leonhardt, Dutch pianist, conductor, and musicologist (born 1928)
- 2013 – Wayne D. Anderson, American baseball player and coach (born 1930)
- 2013 – André Cassagnes, French technician and toy maker, created the Etch A Sketch (born 1926)
- 2013 – Gussie Moran, American tennis player and sportscaster (born 1923)
- 2013 – Pauline Phillips, American journalist and radio host, created Dear Abby (born 1918)
- 2013 – Glen P. Robinson, American businessman, founded Scientific Atlanta (born 1923)
- 2014 – Gary Arlington, American author and illustrator (born 1938)
- 2014 – Ruth Duccini, American actress (born 1918)
- 2014 – Dave Madden, Canadian-American actor (born 1931)
- 2014 – Hiroo Onoda, Japanese lieutenant (born 1922)
- 2015 – Miriam Akavia, Polish-Israeli author and translator (born 1927)
- 2015 – Yao Beina, Chinese singer (born 1981)
- 2016 – Joannis Avramidis, Greek sculptor (born 1922)
- 2016 – Ted Marchibroda, American football player and coach (born 1931)
- 2017 – Eugene Cernan, American captain, pilot, and astronaut (born 1934)
- 2018 – Ed Doolan, British radio presenter (born 1941)
- 2018 – Oliver Ivanović, Kosovo Serb politician (born 1953)
- 2019 – John C. Bogle, American businessman, investor, and philanthropist (born 1929)
- 2019 – Lorna Doom, American musician (born 1958)
- 2019 – Chris Wilson, Australian musician (born 1956)
- 2020 – Christopher Tolkien, British academic and editor (born 1924)
- 2021 – Pedro Trebbau, German-born Venezuelan zoologist (born 1929)
- 2021 – Chris Cramer, British journalist (born 1948)
- 2021 – Phil Spector, American record producer, songwriter (born 1939)
- 2022 – Ibrahim Boubacar Keita, Former Malian President (born 1945)
- 2025 – David Lynch, American filmmaker and actor (born 1946)
- 2025 – Dame Joan Plowright, English actress (born 1929)
- 2025 – Bob Uecker, American professional baseball catcher and sportscaster (born 1934)

== Holidays and observances ==
- Christian feast day:
  - Pope Benjamin (Coptic)
  - Berard of Carbio
  - Blaise (Armenian Apostolic)
  - Fursey
  - Joseph Vaz
  - Honoratus of Arles
  - Pope Marcellus I
  - Solemnity of Mary, Mother of God (Coptic Church)
  - Titian of Oderzo
  - Eve of Saint Anthony observed with ritual bonfires in San Bartolomé de Pinares
  - January 16 (Eastern Orthodox liturgics)
- National Religious Freedom Day (United States)
- Teachers' Day in Thailand and Myanmar
