= Student exchange program =

Program in which secondary school or university students study abroad

A student exchange program is a program in which students from a secondary school (high school) or higher education study abroad at one of their institution's partner institutions. A student exchange program may involve international travel, but does not necessarily require the student to study outside their home country.

Foreign exchange programs provide students with an opportunity to study in another country and experience a different environment. These programs provide opportunities that may not be available in the participant's home country, such as learning about the history and culture of other countries and meeting new friends to enrich their personal development. International exchange programs are also effective to challenge students to develop a global perspective.

The term "exchange" means that a partner institution accepts a student, but it does not necessarily mean that the student has to find a counterpart from the other institution with whom to exchange. Exchange students live with a host family or in designated accommodation such as a hostel, an apartment, or a student lodging. Costs for the program vary by country and institution. Participants fund their participation through scholarships, loans, or self-funding.

Student exchanges became popular after World War II, intended to increase the participants' understanding and tolerance of other cultures, as well as improving their language skills and broadening their social horizons. Student exchanges also increased further after the end of the Cold War. An exchange student typically stays in the host country for a period of 6 to 12 months; however, exchange students may opt to stay for one semester at a time. International students or those on study abroad programs may stay in the host country for several years. Some exchange programs also offer academic credit.

Students of study abroad programs aim to develop a global perspective and cultural understanding by challenging their comfort zones and immersing themselves in a different culture. Studies have shown that students' desire to study abroad has increased, and research suggests that students choose programs because of location, costs, available resources and heritage. Although there are many different exchange programs, most popular are the programs that offer academic credit, as many students are concerned that travel will hinder their academic and professional plans.

== Types of exchange programs ==
=== Short-term exchange ===
A short-term exchange program is also known as STEP. These focus on home-stays, language skills, community service, or cultural activities. High school and university students can apply for the programs through various government or non-governmental organizations that organize the programs. A short-term exchange lasts from one week to three months and doesn't require the student to study in any particular school or institution. The students are exposed to an intensive program that increases their understanding of other cultures, communities, and languages.

=== Long-term exchange ===
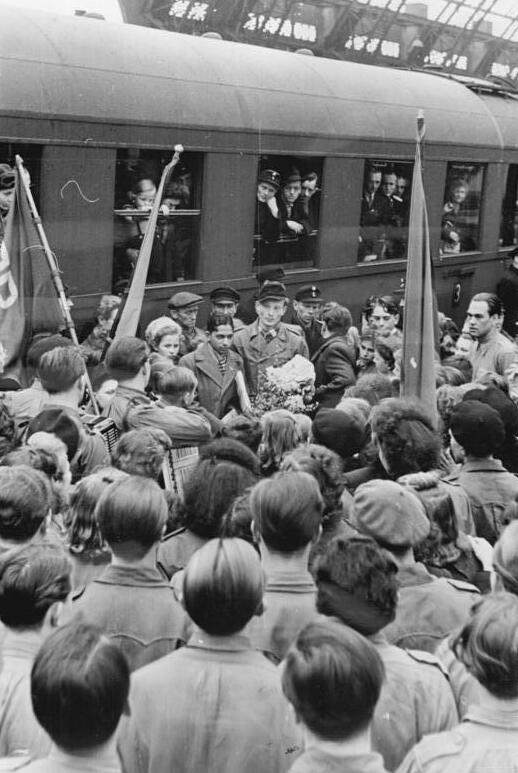
Enthusiastic welcome offered to the first Indian student to arrive in Dresden, East Germany (1951)

A long-term exchange is one which lasts six to ten months or up to one full year. Participants attend high school or university in their host countries, through a student visa. Typically, guest students coming to the United States are issued a J-1 cultural exchange visa or an F-1 foreign student visa. Students are expected to integrate themselves into the host family, immersing themselves in the local community and surroundings. Upon their return to their home country they are expected to incorporate this knowledge into their daily lives, as well as give a presentation on their experience to their sponsors. Many exchange programs expect students to be able converse in the language of the host country, at least on a basic level. Some programs require students to pass a standardized test for English language comprehension prior to being accepted into a program taking them to the United States. Other programs do not examine language ability. Most exchange students become fluent in the language of the host country within a few months. Some exchange programs, such as the Congress-Bundestag Youth Exchange, KL-YES, FLEX are government-funded programs.

The Council on Standards for International Educational Travel is a not-for-profit organization committed to quality international educational travel and exchange for youth at the high school level.

== Application process ==
Long-term (10 to 12-month) exchange applications and interviews generally take place between a few days to few months depending on program type, host university requirements and destination country in advance of departure, Students generally must be between the ages of 13 and 18. Some programs allow students older than 18 years of age in a specialized work-study program.

Some programs require a preliminary application form with fees, followed by interviews and a longer application form. Other programs request a full application from the beginning and then schedule interviews. High school scholarship programs often require a set GPA of around 2.5 or higher. Programs select candidates who are most likely to complete the program and serve as the best ambassadors to the foreign nation. Students in some programs, such as Rotary, are expected to go to any location where the organization places them, and they are encouraged not to have strict expectations of their host country. Students are allowed to choose a country, but may live anywhere within that country.

The home country organization will contact a partner organization in the country of the student's choice. Students accepted for the program may or may not be screened by the organization in their home country. Partner organizations in the destination country have differing levels of screening that students must pass before being accepted into their programs. For example, students coming to America may be allowed to come on the recommendation of the organization in their home country, or the hosting partner may require the student to submit a detailed application, including previous school report cards, letters from teachers and administrators, and standardized English fluency exam papers. The US agency may then accept or decline the applicant. Some organizations also have rules of participation. For example, almost all US organizations do not allow an exchange student to drive an automobile during their visit. Some organizations require a written contract that sets standards for personal behavior and grades, while others may be less rigorous. Lower-cost programs can result in a student participating without a supervisor available nearby to check on the student's well-being. Programs provided by agencies that provide compensation for representatives are most likely to retain local representatives to assist and guide the student and keep track of their well-being.

== Costs ==
The costs of student exchange are determined by the charges from a student exchange program organisation or the university or college. The costs vary depending on the country, length of study and other personal factors. Different programs through the school/university of choice may offer students scholarships that cover the expenses of travel and accommodation and the personal needs of a student.

== Exchanges in different countries ==
=== Australia ===
==== Australian high schools ====
Each state in Australia provides a program of student exchange for secondary students. These are different depending on whether a student in Australia wants to study internationally or a student from another country wants in Australia. Student exchange in Australia, depending on the state, might be managed by registered exchange organizations or the school chosen for study must be registered.

==== Australian universities ====
Exchange programs for university students to study abroad vary depending on the university campus offers. International exchange for tertiary students allows them to gain cultural experience in their studies and a chance to travel abroad while completing their degree.

=== Spain ===
A series of studies conducted within the last decade found similar results in students studying abroad in Spain for a short-term and/or semester long program. These studies found that students can improve their speaking proficiency during one semester, there is a positive relationship between students' integrative motivation and interaction with second language culture, and student contact with the Spanish language has a great effect on their speaking improvement. It is especially apparent in students who live with host families during their program. Anne Reynolds-Case found improvements in understanding and usage of the vosotros form after studying in Spain. One study specifically studies culture perceptions of students studying abroad in Spain. Alan Meredith defines culture as consisting "of patterns, explicit and implicit, of and for behavior acquired and transmitted by symbols, constituting the distinctive achievement of human groups, including their embodiments in artifacts." Questionnaires were given to students living with host families during a two-month program in Spain. He studies how these groups perceive customs, such as concern for personal appearance, physical contact, cooking styles, politics, etc. The study found a variety of results depending the cultural custom. However, the US students' perceptions most closely aligned with the Young Spaniards (16–22 years old). At the same time, Angela George's study found little significance in the adoption of regional features during their semester abroad. Though most of these studies focused on students who came from America to study in Spain, the United States is not the only one sending their students. Brian Denman's article demonstrates an increase of Saudi student mobility for education, including locations such as Spain.

== Drawbacks ==
Even though exchange students learn to improve themselves through the experience of studying and staying in another country, there are also many difficulties. One of them is when exchange students are unable to adapt to pedagogy followed by the host country. Another is conflicts between the host family (who have provided accommodation) and the students, when it cannot be solved by communicating with each other and the student usually will be asked to stay with another host until they find a new match. This process, however, could take time while the students' duration of stay is limited. Even with preparation and knowledge about the new environment, they could still experience culture shock, which can affect them in different ways. Students from a different culture can also encounter homesickness for a longer period of time. Transport can also be a problem, as it is often difficult or impractical for a student to buy a car during a short program. Students will find it hard to find a job, even part-time since most exchange visas do not allow students to work and it is difficult to obtain one that does. Another potential drawback is ill-health that can occur during the stay in a foreign country. Students are advised to always have health insurance while traveling abroad, and carry emergency contact details of their local hosts and of family members as well. Students participating in student exchange programs have sometimes been vulnerable to threats such as terrorism and other crimes. For example, in 1998 a number of US students traveling in Guatemala on a college sponsored trip were attacked in the Santa Lucía Cotzumalguapa area, with the entire group being robbed and physically harassed and threatened, and in the 1998 Santa Lucía Cotzumalguapa attack five of the young women were raped.

== See also ==
- Intercultural relations
- International education
- Second-language acquisition
- Study abroad organization
