= Sebastian Kimura =

Japanese Catholic saint and missionary (1565–1622)

Blessed Sebastian Kimura S.J.
- The martyrdom of Sebastian Kimura
- Born: 1565; Japan
- Died: 10 September 1622 (aged 56–57); Nagasaki, Japan
- Honored in: Catholic Church; Society of Jesus
- Beatified: 7 May 1867, Rome, Papal States by Pope Pius IX, Catholic Church

Sebastian Kimura (1565 – 10 September 1622) was a Japanese Catholic priest and member of the Society of Jesus. He was among the 55 people killed during the Great Genna Martyrdom and subsequently beatified.

== Biography ==
Kimura was born into a Christian family in 1565. His grandfather was the very first Japanese convert baptized by the missionary Francis Xavier. Kimura's family background and fluency in Japanese would prove to be valuable assets in his later ministry.

Drawn to a life of religious service, Kimura entered the Society of Jesus in 1582. He undertook his studies in Japan at institutions run by the Jesuits before traveling to Macau for theological studies. In 1601, Kimura's journey culminated in his ordination as a priest in Nagasaki as the first Japanese Catholic priest, marking a significant milestone for the Catholic Church in Japan.

Kimura's fluency in Japanese and cultural understanding made him adept at navigating the challenges faced by Christians during the period of persecution under Tokugawa Hidetada. He could effectively disguise himself as a soldier, merchant, laborer, or even a physician to visit Christian households and deliver the sacraments to those imprisoned for their faith. This clandestine ministry earned him the attention of the authorities, who actively sought his capture.

Despite efforts to remain hidden, Kimura was betrayed by a servant and apprehended in 1621 alongside his companions. Imprisoned in Suzuta Prison, he found himself reunited with fellow Christians, including Father Carlo Spinola. Ultimately, Kimura was sentenced to death by burning at the stake. He was executed during the Great Genna Martyrdom on 10 September 1622.

Kimura would later be beatified as one of the 205 Martyrs of Japan on 7 May 1867, by Pope Pius IX.

== See also ==
- Martyrs of Japan
- List of Catholic saints
