= Orsucci =

- Noble family
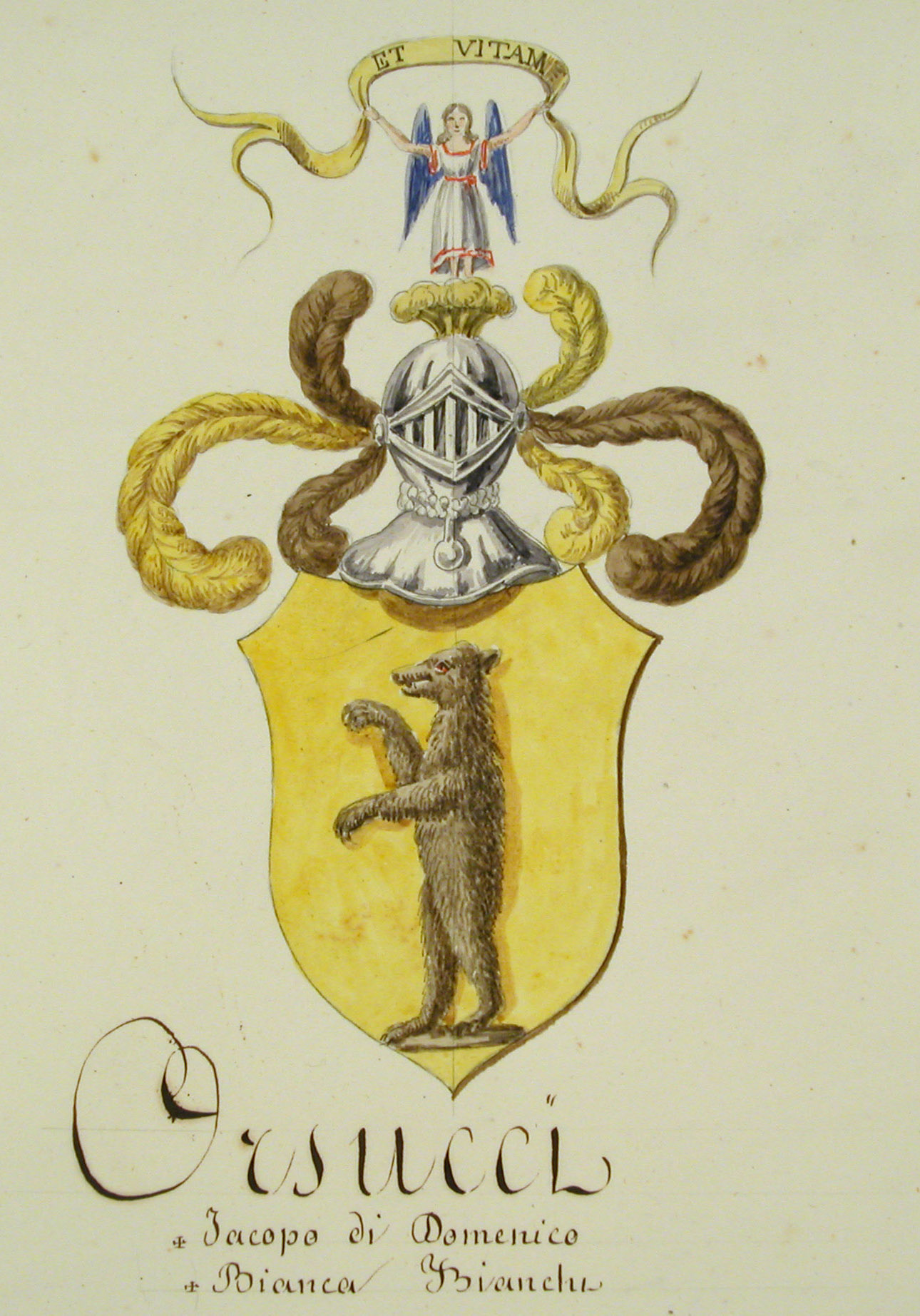
- Coat of arms (Lucca branch) by Jacopo di Domenico
- Country: Italy
- Founded: XIV Century
- Titles: Countship

The Orsucci family is an ancient and noble Italian family. The family has historical branches in the areas of today's Tuscany, most notably in the provinces of Lucca and Pistoia.

== Origin ==
The family's descent can be traced back to the 13th century, to the Lucchese nobleman Bonfigliolo di Orsello di Bonfiglio. The Orsucci family became a prominent Lucchese family during the mid-14th century when Bartolomeo di Orsuccio was elected to the government of the Republic of Lucca. It is from the sons of Bartolomeo di Orsuccio the various branches of the Orsucci family descend. Emperor Charles V awarded Nicolao Vincenzo Orsucci, and future descendants, with the title Count in 1537.

One of the Orsucci family's most notable members is the martyr Angelo Orsucci, who was beatified by Pope Pius IX on 7 May 1867.

== Branches ==
- Orsucci (di Pescia) fasc.3494
- Orsucci (di Lucca) fasc.6143
- Orsucci (di Lucca) fasc.6144
- Mei Orsucci (di Pescia) fasc.5996

== Angelo of Saint Vincent Ferrer Orsucci ==
Angelo Orsucci was born in Lucca on 8 May 1573. At only thirteen years old he left his noble family in Lucca on what became an remarkable journey in the name of the holy father. He was commonly called the "Saint" and was involved in missionary activities around the world: Mexico, Philippines and Japan.

Angelo first arrived in Japan in 1618, during the Tokugawa shogunate's era of martyrs. He was jailed for his missionary acts on 13 December 1618. Angelo sent a letter to his family in Lucca to share the adverse news, with his spirits kept high: "I am very happy for the favor that Our Lord has given me and I would not change this prison with the major palaces of Rome." Angelo Orsucci was sentenced to the flames and joined the companions of martyrdom on 10 September 1622 during the Great Genna Martyrdom. Angelo Orsucci received his solemn beatification in 1867 by Pope Pius IX as part of the 205 Martyrs of Japan.
