= Aleksandr Burago =

Russian Army officer

Aleksandr Petrovich Burago
- Александр Петрович Бураго
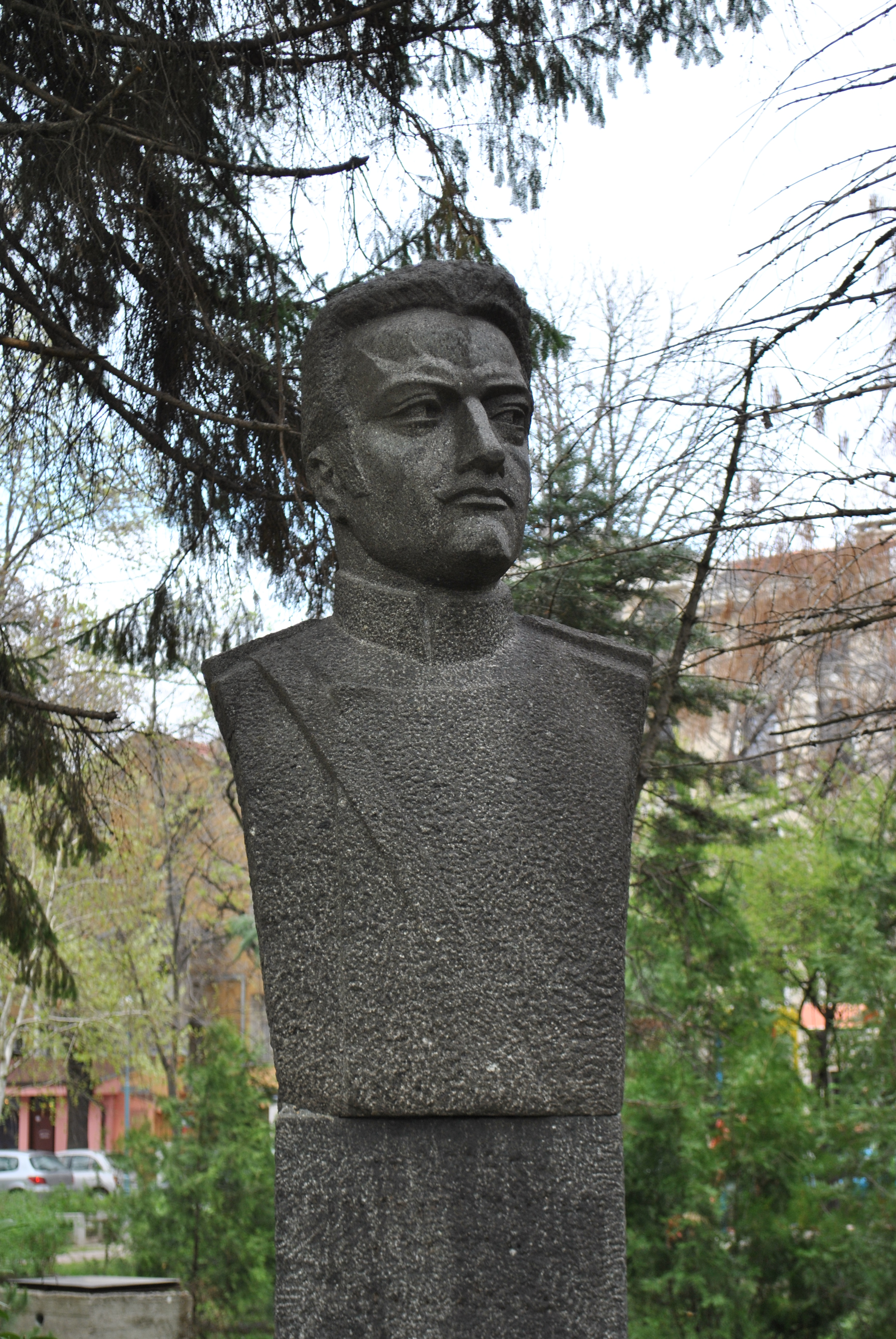
- Monument to Aleksandr Burago in Plovdiv city garden
- Born: calc. abt. 1853
- Died: 1883, aged 30; Madeira
- Burial place: Alexander Nevsky Lavra, Saint Petersburg
- Military career
- Allegiance: Russian Empire
- Branch: Imperial Russian Army
- Rank: captain; colonel
- Conflicts: Russo-Turkish War (1877–1878)
- Awards: Order of St. George (4th deg.)

Aleksandr Petrovich Burago (Russian: Александр Петрович Бураго) was an officer of the Russian Imperial army. Serving as a captain under Joseph Vladimirovich Gourko, he commanded the force that liberated Plovdiv from the Ottoman rule on 16 January 1878. Later on Burago became a colonel. He died of tuberculosis at the age of 30, in 1883, on Madeira, and was buried in the Alexander Nevsky Lavra in Saint Petersburg.

In recognition of his "excellence demonstrated in the battle ... whereupon, together with a squadron of dragoons, having crossed the Maritsa river ... entered the city, still occupied by the Turkish division ... an almost 25 times greater in numbers enemy force", Burago was awarded the Order of St. George of the 4th degree.

Citizens of Plovdiv traditionally honour captain Burago annually on January 16, the anniversary of the liberation of the city. Wreaths and floral tributes are brought to the monument to Burago in the Plovdiv City Garden. A street in Plovdiv was named after captain Burago. In November 2006, along with several other prominent personalities, Aleksandr Burago was, "for exceptional service in development of the city of Plovdiv" posthumously awarded the title of "Honorary citizen of Plovdiv", by decision of the local community council.

== See also ==
- Battle of Philippopolis
