= Great Genna Martyrdom =

1622 Japanese execution of Christians in Nagasaki

Coordinates: 32°45′16″N 129°52′18″E

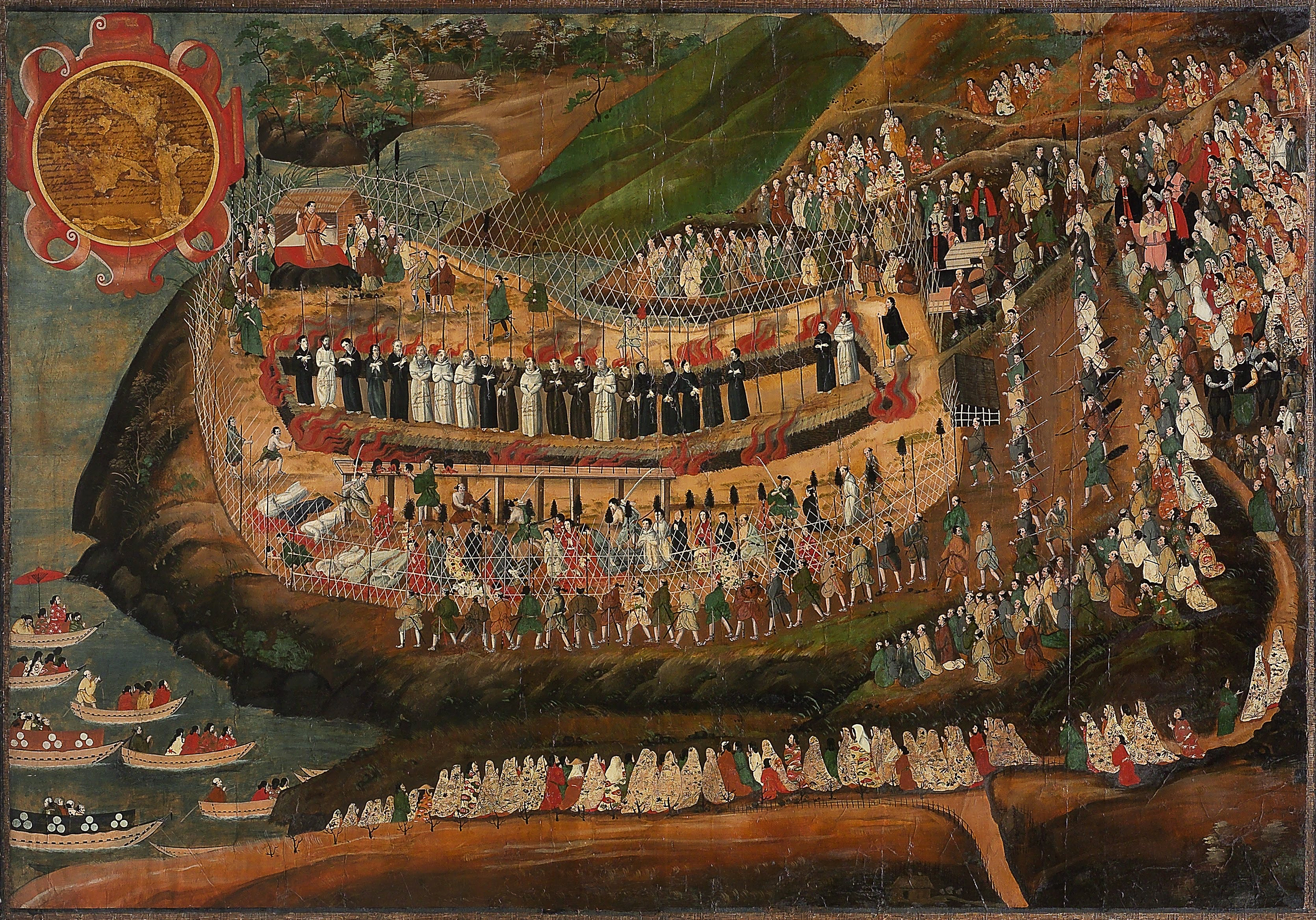
17th-century anonymous painting of the Great Genna Martyrdom at the Church of the Gesù, Rome

The Great Genna Martyrdom (元和の大殉教, Genna no daijunkyō), also known as the Great Martyrdom of Nagasaki, was the execution of 55 foreign and domestic Catholics killed together at Nishizaka Hill in Nagasaki, Japan, on 10 September 1622. Beginning in 1614, Christianity was banned in Japan and a smuggling incident concerning two foreign missionaries prompted the killing. The mass execution was part of the persecution of Christians in Japan by Tokugawa Hidetada, the second Shogun of the Tokugawa shogunate.

== Background and execution ==
=== Background ===
A nationwide ban on Christianity was promulgated in 1614 during the shogunate of Tokugawa Hidetada. In Nagasaki, several measures were taken to implement this ban. Tronu Montane, a scholar at the Kansai Gaidai University described these measures as a "straightforward policy of elimination of Christians that had a dramatic impact on Nagasaki Christian community".

After the death of Tokugawa Ieyasu – the first Shogun of the Tokugawa shogunate – in 1616, the persecution of Christians in Japan focused on the promotion of apostasy and the elimination of foreign missionaries. This policy was implemented in Nagasaki by Gonroku, the bugyō from 1615 to 1625. Large-scale executions were not uncommon parts of this policy of Christian elimination: 23 Christians had been concurrently executed in Edo (Tokyo) in August 1613; 43 in Kuchinotsu, Arima, in November 1614; and 53 in Kyoto in 1619.

=== Execution ===
The "Great Genna Martyrdom" took its name from the Japanese era name of Genna, which denotes the time from July 1615 until February 1624; the mass killing is also known as the Great Martyrdom of Nagasaki. It was preceded by an incident with the Christian Japanese merchant Hirayama Jōchin, who had received an official seal to trade with Manila. In 1620, Hirayama tried to smuggle two Mendicant priests disguised as merchants (Pedro de Zúñiga and Luis Flores) on his way back from Manila into Japan, but before they could enter Japanese territory, his ship was attacked by Dutch and English forces and its cargo was confiscated. The crew of the ship, including the priests, were imprisoned in Hirado.

Hirayama claimed that his official seal should grant his ship protection; the Dutch and English, however, argued that the presence of priests forfeited this protection. After two years of imprisonment, the priests confessed that they were indeed Christian missionaries. This confession resulted in the burning alive of the two priests and Hirayama as well as the decapitation of the remaining crew in Nagasaki on 19 August 1622.

Due to this smuggling incident, the persecution of Christians was intensified and the bugyō Gonroku ordered the killing of all priests imprisoned in the Nagasaki and Ōmura prisons as well as some of their followers. In total, 55 Christians were to be executed. The execution of these 55 Christians, now known as the Great Genna Martyrdom, occurred on 10 September 1622 on Nishizaka Hill in Nagasaki. It thus happened at the same place as the crucifixion of the 26 Martyrs of Japan on 5 February 1597.

An early account of the execution is provided in a 1624 pamphlet by Andres de Parra printed in Madrid. The pamphlet in Spanish is titled Relacion breve de los grandes y rigurosos martirios que el año passado de 1622. dieron en el Iapon a ciento y diez y ocho illustrissimos Martyres, sacada principalmente de las cartas de los Padres de la Compañia de Iesus que alli residen: y de lo que han referido muchas personas de aquel Reyno, que en dos nauios llegaron a la ciudad de Manila a 12. de Agosto de 1623 (lit. 'A Brief Account of the Great and Rigorous Martyrdoms which Last Year, 1622, Were Inflicted in Japan on One Hundred and Eighteen Illustrious Martyrs, Drawn Principally From the Letters of the Fathers of the Society of Jesus Who Reside There, and From What Has Been Reported by Many Persons of that Kingdom, Who Arrived in Two Ships at the City of Manila on 12 August 1623'). The pamphlet was translated in part into English in 1927.

The Imago primi saeculi, a 1640 book about the Society of Jesus, contains a description of the Great Genna Martyrdom:

To make the punishment longer and more cruel, the fire was six cubits away from the (martyr's) body. The arms were lightly bound to the posts, and [the restraints] were tied loosely. And they were made so that they were not difficult to untie. Those who did not dare to endure the punishment could escape if they wanted to. But there was not one of them who did not look to the heavens with his eyes, not one who did not endure the fire without moving his heart and body, even though the wood was burning strongly around them.

— Imago primi saeculi, pp. 528–529

While this account implies that the condemned in principle could have untied their restraints, this would not have resulted in them being able to flee. Condemned who untied their restraints and attempted to flee would have been captured by the executioners and thrown into the flames again.

== List of the martyrs ==
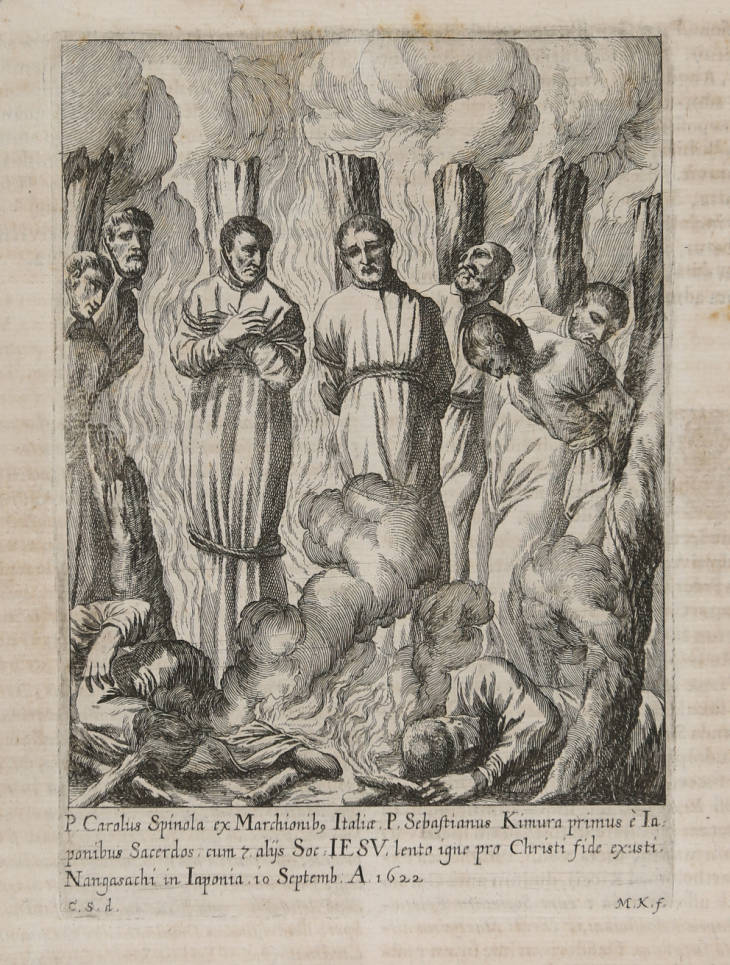
1675 engraving of the Martyrdom by Melchior Küsel

During the Great Genna Martyrdom, 55 people were executed. Of them, 24 or 25 were burned, while 30 or 31 were beheaded. The 24 or 25 people executed by burning consisted of two priests of the Jesuit order, eight Jesuit irmãos (lit. 'brothers'), two priests of the Franciscan order, five priests of the Dominican order, two Dominican irmãos, two lay members of the Dominican Confraternity of the Holy Rosary and three lay catechists. The 30 or 31 people executed by beheading were lay Kirishitans, numbering 27 Japanese and four Koreans. Five of those killed were children aged 3 to 12 years old. All 55 executed Christians were beatified by Pope Pius IX as part of the beatification of the 205 Martyrs of Japan on 7 July 1867. Their feast day is September 10, the day of the execution.

=== Dominican martyrs ===
The Dominicans killed included:

- Angelo Orsucci also known as Angel Ferrer Orsucci (b. 1573),
- Jacinto Orfanell (b. 1578),
- José Salvanés de San Jacinto (b. 1580),
- Alfonso de Mena (b. 1578),
- Francisco de Morales (b. 1567),
- Juan Nagata Magoshiro, and
- Tomás del Rosario.

There were at least three Japanese men admitted to the Third Order of Saint Dominic among the victims:

- Diego Chinba,
- Domingo Tanda, and
- Paulo Nagaishi.

=== Franciscan martyrs ===
The Franciscans killed included:

- Fray Vicente de San José (b. 1597) also known as Vicente Ramíre,
- Ricardo de Santa Ana (b. 1585),
- Pedro de Ávila (b. 1591), and
- León Satzuma.

=== Jesuit martyrs ===
The Jesuits killed included at least one foreign missionary:

- Charles Spinola,

and nine Japanese Jesuits:

- Antonio Sanga,
- Sebastian Kimura,
- Antonio Kyūni,
- Pedro Sanpō,
- Gonzalo Fusai Chōzō,
- Miguel Satō Shunpō,
- Tomé Akahoshi,
- Luis Kawara Rokuemon, and
- Juan Chūgoku.

== See also ==
- 205 Martyrs of Japan
- 26 Martyrs of Japan – A separate martyrdom in 1597
  - Twenty-Six Martyrs Museum and Monument – A museum for the 1597 martyrdom
- Great Martyrdom of Edo – A separate martyrdom in 1623
