= 55 Pandora =

Fairly large and very bright asteroid in the asteroid belt

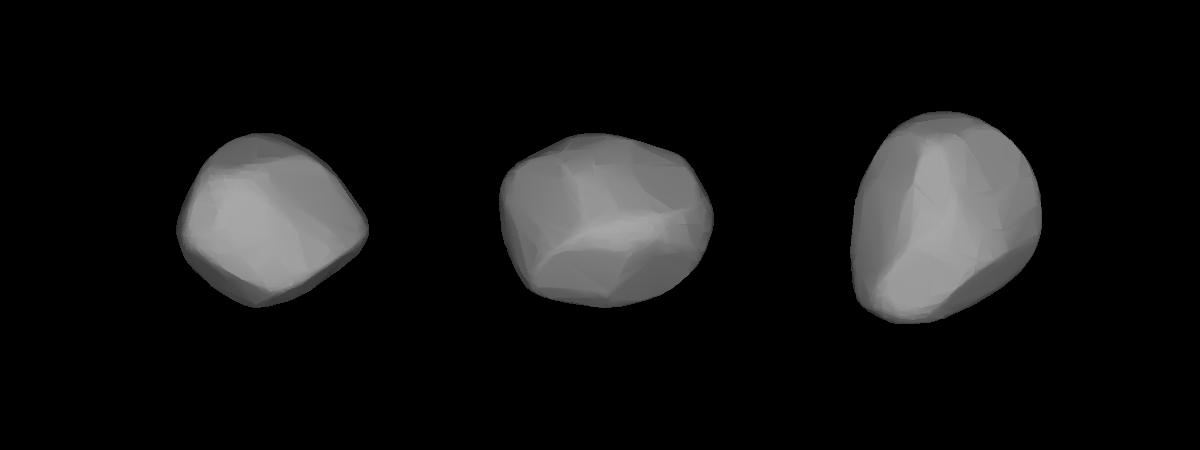
- Light curve–based 3D model of Pandora

Discovery
- Discovered by: George Mary Searle
- Discovery site: Albany, New York
- Discovery date: 10 September 1858

Designations
- Pronunciation: /pænˈdɔːrə/
- Named after: Pandora
- Minor planet category: Main belt
- Adjectives: Pandorian /pænˈdɔːriən/
- Symbol: (astrological)

Orbital characteristics
- Epoch 5 May 2025
- Aphelion: 3.158 AU (472.4 Gm)
- Perihelion: 2.358 AU (352.8 Gm)
- Semi-major axis: 2.758 AU (412.6 Gm)
- Eccentricity: 0.145
- Orbital period (sidereal): 4.58 yr (1,673 d)
- Mean anomaly: 114.416°
- Inclination: 7.176°
- Longitude of ascending node: 10.287°
- Argument of perihelion: 4.996°

Physical characteristics
- Mean diameter: 70 ± 7 km
- Mass: (9.9±1.8)×10^{17} kg (Note: Calculated from its standard gravitational parameter GM = 0.066±0.012 km^{3}/s^{2}.)
- Mean density: 5.5±1.9 g/cm^{3} (calculated)
- Synodic rotation period: 4.804 h
- Pole ecliptic longitude: 223°
- Pole ecliptic latitude: 18°
- Geometric albedo: 0.204
- Spectral type: Tholen = M SMASS = X
- Absolute magnitude (H): 7.84

55 Pandora is a fairly large and relatively bright asteroid in the asteroid belt. Pandora was discovered by American astronomer and Catholic priest George Mary Searle on 10 September 1858, from the Dudley Observatory near Albany, New York. It was his only asteroid discovery.

It is named after Pandora, the first woman in Greek mythology, who unwisely opened a box that released evil into the world. The name was apparently chosen by Blandina Dudley, widow of the founder of the Dudley Observatory, who had been involved in an acrimonious dispute with the director of the observatory, astronomer B. A. Gould. Gould felt that the name had an "apt significance". The asteroid shares its name with Pandora, a moon of Saturn.

This object is orbiting the Sun with a period of 4.58 years, a semi-major axis of 2.76 AU, and an eccentricity of 0.15. Its orbital plane lies at an angle of 7.2° to the plane of the ecliptic. Photometric observations of this asteroid at the Rozhen Observatory in Bulgaria during 2010 gave a light curve with a period of 4.7992 hours and a brightness variation of Δm=0.22 mag. This is consistent with a period of 4.804 hours and an amplitude of 0.24 obtained during a 1977 study. It has a cross-sectional size of 84.8 kilometers (52.7 mi).
