= Battle of Plovdiv (1878) =

1878 battle of the Russo-Turkish War (1877–1878)

Coordinates: 42°9′N 24°45′E

- Part of the Russo-Turkish War of 1877–1878
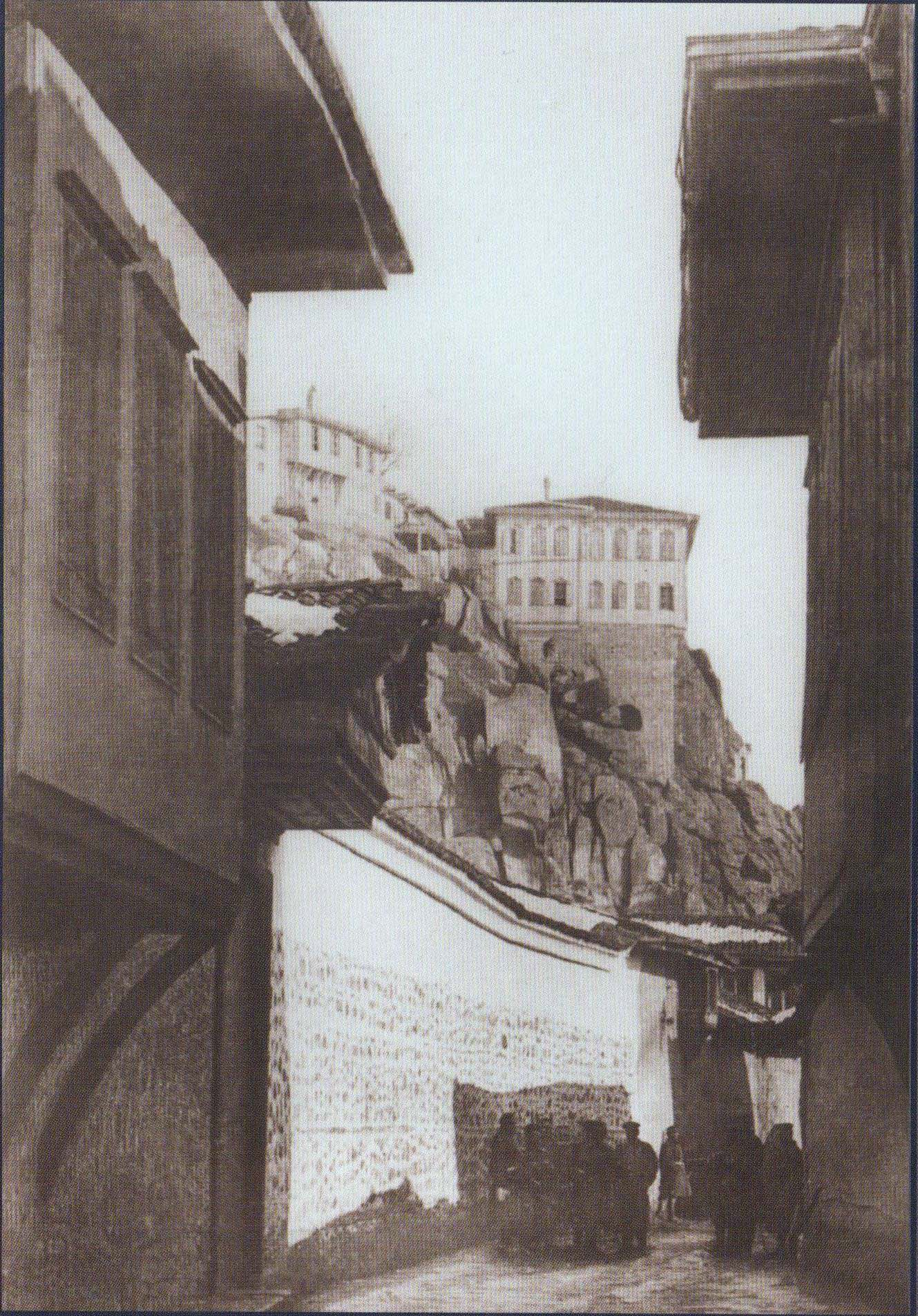
- View of one of the streets of Filipoppol (Plovdiv) after the liberation, January 1878
Date	14–16 January 1878
Location	Sanjak of Plovdiv, Edirne Province, Ottoman Empire (now Plovdiv, Bulgaria)
Result	Russian victory
Territorial changes	Russians capture Edirne

Belligerents
Russian Empire	Ottoman Empire

Commanders and leaders
Iosif Gurko	Suleiman Pasha

Strength
≈70,000	50,000–60,000

Casualties and losses
1,300 killed and wounded	5,000 killed and wounded, 2,000 captured

The Battle of Plovdiv, or Battle of Philippopolis, was one of the final battles of the 1877–1878 Russo-Turkish War.

Following the crushing Russian victory at the last battle of Shipka Pass, Russian commander Gen. Joseph Vladimirovich Gourko began to move southeast towards Constantinople. Blocking the route was the Ottoman fortress at Plovdiv under Suleiman Pasha. On 16 January 1878, a squadron of Russian dragoons led by Captain Alexander Burago stormed the city. Its defenses were strong but superior Russian numbers overwhelmed them and the Ottoman forces retreated almost to Constantinople. At this time foreign powers intervened and Russia agreed to the Treaty of San Stefano.

== Gallery ==
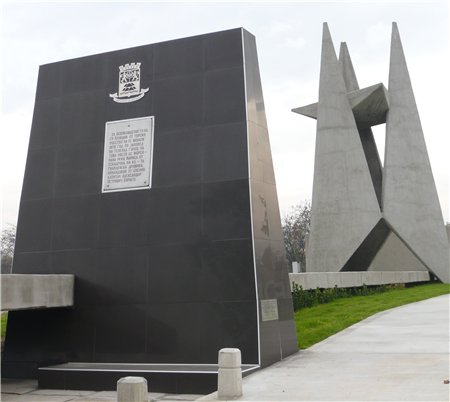
The monument to the Liberation of Plovdiv

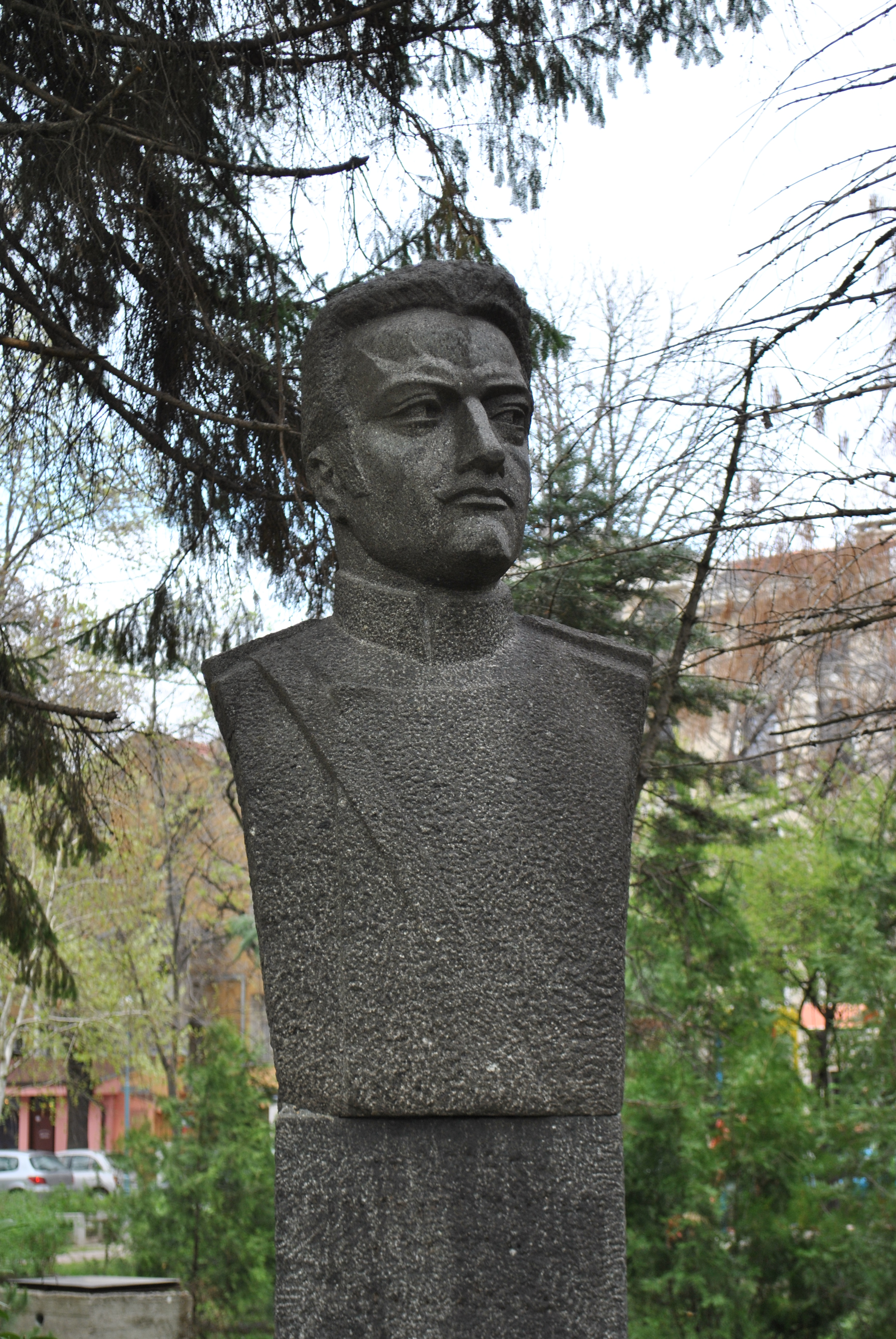
Captain Aleksandr Burago's monument in Plovdiv

== Background ==
From July to December 1877, the Balkan front of the Russo-Turkish War entered a prolonged stalemate centered on the Ottoman defense of Plevna, led by Osman Pasha. After months of siege and several costly assaults, Russian and Romanian forces finally broke the deadlock when General Mikhail Skobelev launched a fierce counterattack. Osman Pasha, having been wounded during an attempted breakout, surrendered on December 10, bringing an end to the 143-day siege.

Following this victory, the Russian command sought to capitalize on their momentum before the Ottomans could regroup. Ignoring the harsh winter conditions, Russian forces advanced across the Balkan Mountains in a daring mid-winter campaign.

General Iosif Gurko led this operation, organizing his force into three main columns: On the right flank, under Lieutenant General Wilhelminov, were 8 battalions, 12 Cossack Sotnias, and 12 guns from the IX Corps. The left and center columns, commanded by Lieutenant General Count Krüdener, comprised 24 battalions, 16 cavalry squadrons, and 58 guns.

The Russian advance caught the Ottomans by surprise. Sofia was captured with minimal resistance in early January 1878. Attempting to halt the Russian push into Thrace, Ottoman forces regrouped and attempted to mount a defense at the Shipka Pass. However, Russian troops, supported by Bulgarian volunteers, inflicted heavy casualties—approximately 4,000—and took some 26,000 prisoners.

In response to the defeat at Shipka, the Ottoman forces evacuated their defensive line at Trajan's Gate, further opening the road for the Russian advance into southern Bulgaria and setting the stage for the Battle of Plovdiv.

== Converging towards battle ==
Gurko had split the Turkish forces into 2. The first detachment numbered 15,000 men and was located at Radomir, south of Sofia. The 2nd had about 20,000 and was located at Samokov. 20,000 reinforced the 1st detachment and scattered the troops around Ihtiman. Gurko responded by sending Wilhelminov's 9th corps to the 2nd detachment at Samokov and cut off their retreat and attack the rear of the 2nd's at Trajan's pass. Krüdener's army was to intercept and attack the Turkish right. 8 battalions, 8 squadrons, and 14 guns were left in Sofia to protect the rear of the columns and guard the stores captured there.

The Russians reached the Turkish positions on the morning of the 11th. Due to a misunderstanding regarding the declaration of an armistice, Wilhelminov didn't attack for almost 24 hours. He took Samokov on the same day, losing only 150 men. The Turkish left, however, retreated early after hearing Sulieman's order to evacuate Trajan's Gate after the battle a day before. The Turks also reached the Maritsa valley before the 6 battalions of the advanced guard under Shuvalov's advanced guard to intercept them due to the artillery which had to be delayed because of the icy slopes. The next day, they captured 300 ox-carts left behind by the Ottomans. They found 8,000 men under Faud Pasha the next day with strong positions on the Topolnitsa river. Russian forces, in no position to go for a full assault, could only skirmish while the Ottoman army and Faud retreated with 20,000 men on the 14th with a 1,500-strong cavalry rearguard. He destroyed any bridges they came across and went along country roads instead of main roads.

== Battle ==
On the 15th, Shuvalov and his force-numbering about 15,000- caught up to the tired Ottomans in a village called Adakioi. He got his troops in position, fired on the Turks and sent word to Gurko asking to continue on. Gurko responded at 10 A.M. saying not to attack but keep them under fire while he sends his troops to flank them and cut them from Plovdiv. Gurko then ordered for:

1. Krüdener's column with the 3rd guards division to move towards Philippopolis 9 miles in advance.

2. The Finland regiments followed by Schilder-Schuldner's brigades drive the Turks out of the village and move around the Turkish right flanks

3.The Preobrazhensky and Semyonovsky to attack the Turkish center at Kadikioi.

4. The grenadier, Paul, and Moscow regiments and the Rifle brigade to keep up the fire against the left bank of the Turks and keep them in place if possible.

5. The column of Wilhelminov to move along the railroad and come up on the right of Shuvalov.

Suleiman Pasha's army consisted of 50,000-60,000 men, but him and 10,000-15,000 others fled east to defend Plovdiv, leaving Faud Pasha with about 35,000 to defend. Meanwhile, Shuvalov's coloumn was struggling in Karatair since the column under Shuvalov hadn't arrived. A counterattack by the Paul regiment and Wilhelminov's column finally arriving pushed the Turks back. Shuvalov lost 300 men. Faud Pasha abandoned his positions and took new positions along the mountains of Dermendere. Wilhelminov followed him along the base and Faud counter-attacked 3 times. Each one of them failed and the Ottomans lost 600 men while the Russians lost 60. On the same day (January 16) Gurko seeing the bridges destroyed, ferried the horses of the 2nd cavalry division to the fort of Karagatch where Suliemans rear was. Russian forces captured all 18 guns, but lost 260 men.

In the early morning hours of January 17, captain Burago, commander of the 2nd Dragoon Squadron was tasked with conducting reconnaissance. However, he turned this into an opportunity to take Plovdiv. Him and his 63 men entered the city on horseback and stunned the defenders. Gurko sent the rest of the army hearing this and the town was liberated the next morning. Gurko sent the Caucasian brigade led by Mikhail Skobelev to chase the remaining troops.

== Aftermath ==
The battle of Plovdiv was a sigfificant battle of the 1877–78 Russo Turkish war. Not only did it break the stalemate in the Balkan region, but also defeated the Ottoman military there. The Ottomans lost 5,000 killed or wounded, 2,000 taken prisoners and 114 guns lost. Russia only had 1,300 casualties. The Russians pushed on, capturing Adrianople and almost captured Constantinople, but Britain sent its warships there and made Russia sign for peace at the Treaty of San Stefano and the later Treaty of Berlin.
