= Charles Spinola =

Jesuit missionary (1564–1622)

Blessed Charles Spinola S.J.
- Born: 1564; Genoa, Italy
- Died: 10 September 1622; Nagasaki, Japan
- Venerated in: Roman Catholicism

Charles Spinola (1564 – 10 September 1622), also known as Carlo Spinola, was a Jesuit missionary from Genoa, Italy, martyred in Japan as a missionary.

== Life ==
Charles (or Carlo) Spinola was born in January 1564 in Genoa, Italy, the son of Ottavio Spinola, Count of Tassarolo. He was educated in Spain and in the Jesuit school in Nola, Italy, where he lived with his uncle, Philip Cardinal Spinola, Bishop of Nola. He entered the Jesuit novitiate in December 1584, and studied in Naples, Milan, and Rome. He was ordained a priest in 1594, and assigned to serve parishes in Cremona.

== Travels ==
In 1595, he received a letter appointing him to the missions in Japan. His journey was marked by shipwrecks and delays, which included his being detained in England. He first left Italy on his way to Japan in December 1595 but reached his destination only in 1602, over six years later. The first ship he took from Genoa struck a rock and was forced to return to Genoa for repairs. Setting out again, he arrived in Barcelona and made his way on foot to Lisbon.

Spinola, with 7 other Jesuits, set sail from Lisbon on 10 April 1596 with the Portuguese India fleet, bound for Goa. A violent storm damaged the ship's rudder and they were forced to make for Brazil, where they landed on 15 July. They stayed for five months while their ship was repaired, leaving on 12 December 1596, to return to Lisbon. A severe storm damaged their ship again and they made for Puerto Rico, where they disembarked on 25 March 1597. The missionaries found the general state of morality among the Spanish sugar plantations deplorable, and Spinola considered their arrival providential. Based in San Juan, he and the small band of Jesuits preached and taught catechism, visiting outlying settlements. On one occasion, Spinola was nearly drowned when his horse lost its footing crossing a river.

In order to return to Lisbon, the group of Jesuits decided to split up among a number of Portuguese ships which set sail together from Puerto Rico on 21 August 1597. The fleet was soon dispersed in a storm. Spinola's ship was captured by an English ship off the Azores on 18 October and he, with his companion Jerome de Angelis, arrived in 'Arthmuth' (Dartmouth), England, on 5 November. The next day, his ship continued to its home port 'Atapson' (Topsham), six leagues from 'Arthmuth', where Spinola and de Angelis spent a month being looked after at the Captain's expense. With the captain's help, they left 'Atapson' on 6 December in a small boat bound for France, but in a storm were swept back to the English coast, where they spent a further month in a different port. At the beginning of January 1598, he and de Angelis found passage to Lisbon on a German merchant ship.

Spinola spent another year in Lisbon awaiting permission to resume his journey to Japan before setting out once again with the India fleet in the spring of 1599. This time he had an easier journey, reaching Japan in May 1602 via Goa, Malacca and Macao.

== Missionary activity in Japan and Martyrdom ==
Spinola studied Japanese in Macao before going to Miyako (Kyoto) where he was minister at the Jesuit College, and a teacher of mathematics and astronomy. For twelve years, he worked at ministering to the growing Christian community in Japan. In 1614, all foreign missionaries were banished so Spinola went into hiding, eluding capture for four years. After being arrested in 1618, he, Ambrose Fernandes and their catechist, John Chogoku, were imprisoned for four years in a birdcage-like confinement under harsh conditions. He was burnt at the stake at Nagasaki on 10 September 1622 during the Great Genna Martyrdom. Spinola was declared Blessed in 1867, along with 30 other Jesuits, over half of whom were Japanese.
