= 1998 Santa Lucía Cotzumalguapa attack =

Thirteen American students were attacked in Guatemala

- Location: Santa Lucía Cotzumalguapa, Guatemala
- Date: January 16, 1998; 3:30–5:00 pm (UTC-6)
- Attack type: Assault, rape, robbery
- Victims: 13 students, 5 of whom were raped; 2 professors, 1 administrator, 1 bus driver

On January 16, 1998, thirteen American students were attacked and robbed at gunpoint while on a school-sponsored trip to Guatemala; five of the participants were raped. The case led to attention from the highest levels of the American and Guatemalan governments, including then-US president Bill Clinton, and added to growing concerns about whether the safety of students was adequately protected while studying abroad. The students were studying at St. Mary's College of Maryland.

== Background ==
This was the third year in which the college had been offering annual tours for students to Guatemala. The 17-day tours were conducted during the winter recess and were offered for college credit. There had been no significant problems on either of the previous tours. However, violence against women had been rising in the area. In December 1997, a public bus was hijacked with everyone being robbed. Four other American women were raped in Guatemala in other incidents in July and August 1997.

== Details ==
The group consisted of 13 students—12 women and 1 man—along with two faculty members and an administrator from St. Mary's College. According to the Boston Globe, they arrived in Guatemala without a clear itinerary and without knowing the location of their hotel. Near the end of their trip, they took a tour bus from Guatemala City to the rural community of Xojola, and had passed by Santa Lucía Cotzumalguapa on their way to Xojola when they were attacked. At about 3:30 pm on January 16, 1998, their bus was forced off the road by at least four gunmen (seven according to a later report by CBC News). Gunshots were fired to force the driver to pull into a ditch alongside the road. The bus was forced into a nearby sugar cane field where it was not visible from the road. All of the people in the group were robbed, and the gunmen were disappointed that they weren't carrying more cash. This might have led the gunmen to escalate the attack from robbery to rape. The students were frisked and groped, and five women were then methodically selected to be raped. One was raped on the bus and the other four were raped in the field. The passengers exiting the bus were required to lie face down as each of the five women, one at a time, were raped multiple times. The women who were raped were aged 19 and 20. The rape victims returned to the United States on January 17, 1998, with the rest of the group following the next day.

== Criminal trial ==
Two of the rape victims returned to Guatemala in January 1999 to testify against their attackers. The accused men were Cosby Urias, a 37-year-old laborer; Rony Polanco, a 25-year-old driver; and Reyes Guch Ventura, a 25-year-old peddler. All three men were convicted and sentenced to 28 years in prison: 18 years for rape and 10 years for robbery.

== Aftermath and civil lawsuit ==
Following the attack, the college stopped offering trips to Guatemala for student groups, but continued to organize trips to other destinations including Belize, Hungary and Italy.

Three of the students sued the college and the professors who planned and led the trip, alleging that they were negligent and failed to take reasonable steps to inform them and protect them despite published warnings from the U.S. State Department about other recent, similar attacks. The named defendants included the two professors who planned and led the trip: William Roberts, professor of anthropology, and Jorge Rogachevsky, professor of Latin American studies; additional defendants were the board of trustees, the college president, and an administrator who accompanied the trip. One victim sued for $5 million; another for $500,000; and third for $250,000. One of the plaintiffs said she filed the lawsuit to raise awareness of the need for colleges to understand risks and make better decisions. The lawsuit was eventually settled, with one plaintiff receiving $100,000 (the maximum amount allowed by law due to the college being a state-operated institution); another $65,000; and the third $30,000. The college president Jane Margaret O'Brien said the college was not responsible but was willing to settle the lawsuit to avoid the pain to all of going to trial.
