= Israel Abramofsky =

Russian-American painter

Israel Abramofsky (September 10, 1888 – January 16, 1975), was a Russian-born artist, who trained in Paris and settled in the United States, known for his landscape works, and works depicting Jewish life in Eastern Europe.

== Biography ==
Abramofsky was born in Kiev, Russian Empire (present-day Ukraine) and left Czarist Russia for Vienna, Austria, where he first took an interest in art. He lived briefly in Paris and arrived in the United States in 1909. Toledo, Ohio became his home. He went back to France in 1914, 1920 and 1925 to study with Jean Paul Laurens and Lucien Simon in the Julian Academy. In Paris, he saw the works of Chirico, Van Dongen, Delauney, Lhote, Leger, Ozenfant, Dufresne, Dufy, Gris, Modigliani, Segonzac, Gromaire and many others. For his first trip back to Paris from Ohio, he came with a letter of introduction from noted Toledo mayor Brand Whitlock.

His works have been represented in collections of the Luxembourg Museum, the Museum in Israel, the Brooklyn Museum, in numerous museums in Ohio and many private collections.

In a brief biographical piece, he wrote, "I am unable to classify myself, except I hope that I am a part of the twentieth century. I do feel that my Jewish types reflect the tradition and beliefs that have kept them separate as a people since Abraham."

== Exhibitions ==
- "Retrospective Exhibition of the Drawings and Paintings of Toledo's I. Abramovsky, March 8–19, 1966, Jewish Community Center, Toledo, Ohio
- I. Abramofsky, Exhibition and Sale, March 28 through April 4, 1976, Temple Shomer Emunim, Sylvania, Ohio
